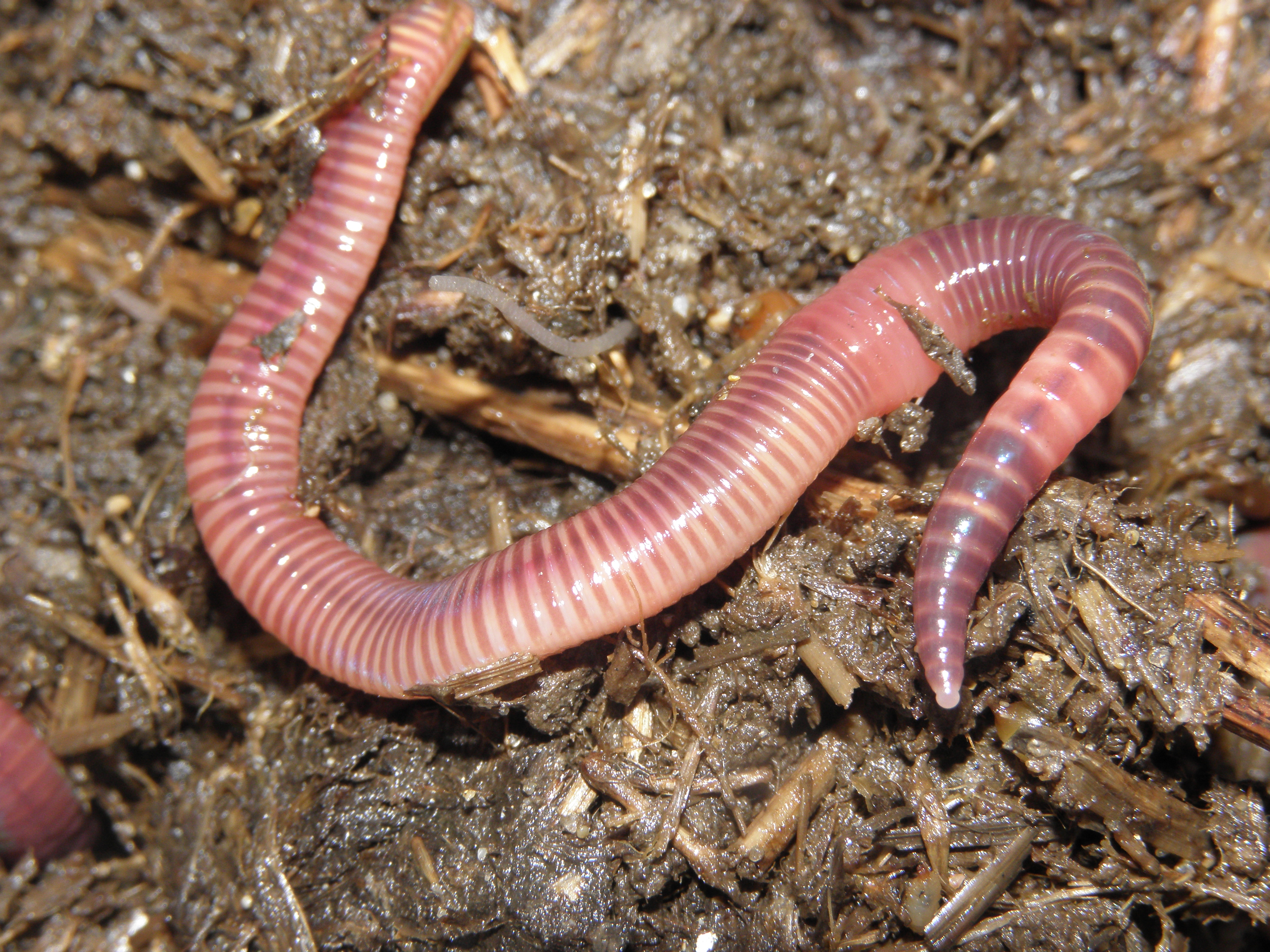
- Eisenia fetida

Scientific classification
- Kingdom: Animalia
- Phylum: Annelida
- Clade: Pleistoannelida
- Clade: Sedentaria
- Class: Clitellata
- Order: Opisthopora
- Suborder: Lumbricina; Blainville, 1828

Families
- See text.

= Earthworm =

Earthworm Temporal range: 209–0 Ma Late Triassic (Norian) - Present

Terrestrial invertebrate, order Opisthopora

An earthworm is a soil-dwelling terrestrial invertebrate that belongs to the phylum Annelida. The term is the common name for the largest members of the class (or subclass, depending on the author) Oligochaeta. In classical systems, they were in the order of Opisthopora since the male pores opened posterior to the female pores, although the internal male segments are anterior to the female. Theoretical cladistic studies have placed them in the suborder Lumbricina of the order Haplotaxida, but this may change. Other slang names for earthworms include "dew-worm", "rainworm", "nightcrawler", and "angleworm" (from its use as angling hookbait). Larger terrestrial earthworms are also called megadriles (which translates to "big worms") as opposed to the microdriles ("small worms") in the families Tubificidae (semiaquatic), Lumbricidae and Enchytraeidae (terrestrial). The megadriles are characterized by a distinct clitellum (more extensive than that of microdriles) and a vascular system with true capillaries.

Earthworms are commonly found in moist, compost-rich soil, eating a wide variety of organic matters, which include detritus, living protozoa, nematodes, bacteria, fungi and algae (including diatoms and cyanobacteria). An earthworm's digestive system runs the length of its body. They are one of nature's most important detritivores and coprophages, and also serve directly as food for many low-level consumers (predation) within the ecosystems (e.g. wild boars, moles, blackbirds, centipedes), ground beetles, flatworms. Their excreta (faeces, mucus), too, are used as food sources.

Earthworms exhibit an externally segmented tube-within-a-tube body plan with corresponding internal segmentations, and usually have setae on all segments. They have a double fluid transport system made of coelomic fluid that moves within the fluid-filled coelom and a simple, closed circulatory system, and respire (breathe) via cutaneous respiration. As soft-bodied invertebrates, they lack a true skeleton, but their structure is maintained by fluid-filled coelom chambers that function as a hydrostatic skeleton.

Earthworms have a central nervous system consisting of two ganglia above the mouth, one on either side, connected to an axial nerve running along its length to motor neurons and sensory cells in each segment. Large numbers of chemoreceptors concentrate near its mouth. Circumferential and longitudinal muscles edging each segment let the worm move. Similar sets of muscles line the gut tube, and their actions propel digested food toward the worm's anus.

Most earthworms are hermaphrodites: each worm carries male and female reproductive organs and genital pores. When mating, two individual earthworms will exchange sperm and fertilize each other's ova. However, many earthworm species are parthenogenetic, in particular in the Lumbricidae family (e.g. the test worm Eisenia fetida).

== Anatomy ==
=== Form and function ===
Earthworm head

Depending on the species, an adult earthworm can be from 10 mm (0.39 in) long and 1 mm (0.039 in) wide to 3 m (9.8 ft) long and over 25 mm (0.98 in) wide, but the typical Lumbricus terrestris grows to about 360 mm (14 in) long. Probably the longest worm on confirmed records is Amynthas mekongianus that extends up to 3 m (10 ft) in the mud along the banks of the 4,350 km (2,700 mi) Mekong River in Southeast Asia.

From front to back, the basic shape of the earthworm is a cylindrical tube-in-a-tube, divided into a series of segments (called metameres) that compartmentalize the body. Furrows are generally externally visible on the body demarking the segments. Dorsal pores and nephridiopores exude a fluid that moistens and protects the worm's surface, also allowing it to breathe. Except for the mouth and anal segments, each segment carries bristlelike hairs called lateral setae used to anchor parts of the body during movement. Species may have four pairs of setae on each segment or more than eight sometimes forming a complete circle of setae per segment. Special ventral setae are used to anchor mating earthworms by their penetration into the bodies of their mates.

Generally, within a species, the number of segments found is consistent across specimens, and individuals are born with the number of segments they will have throughout their lives, growth in size being by enlarging existing segments rather than by adding new ones. The first body segment (segment number 1) features both the earthworm's mouth and, overhanging the mouth, a fleshy lobe called the prostomium, which seals the entrance when the worm is at rest, but is also used to feel and chemically sense the worm's surroundings. Some species of earthworm can even use the prehensile prostomium to grab and drag items such as grasses and leaves into their burrow.

An adult earthworm develops a belt-shaped glandular swelling, called the clitellum, which covers several segments toward the front part of the animal. This is part of the reproductive system and produces egg capsules. The posterior segment is most commonly cylindrical like the rest of the body, but depending on the species, it may also be quadrangular, octagonal, trapezoidal, or flattened. The last segment is called the periproct; the earthworm's anus, a short vertical slit, is found on this segment.

A segment of an earthworm posterior to the clitellum including all of the segmental structures

The exterior of an individual segment is a thin cuticle over the skin, commonly pigmented red to brown, which has specialized cells that secrete mucus over the cuticle to keep the body moist and ease movement through the soil. Under the skin is a layer of nerve tissue, and two layers of muscles—a thin outer layer of circular muscle, and a much thicker inner layer of longitudinal muscles. Interior to the muscle layer is a fluid-filled chamber called a coelom that by its pressurization provides structure to the worm's boneless body. The segments are separated from each other by septa (the plural of "septum") which are perforated transverse walls, allowing the coelomic fluid to pass between segments. A pair of structures called nephrostomes are located at the back of each septum; a nephric tubule leads from each nephrostome through the septum and into the following segment. This tubule then leads to the main body fluid filtering organ, the nephridium or metanephridium, which removes metabolic waste from the coelomic fluid and expels it through pores called nephridiopores on the worm's sides; usually, two nephridia (sometimes more) are found in most segments. At the centre of a worm is the digestive tract, which runs straight through from mouth to anus without coiling, and is flanked above and below by blood vessels (the dorsal blood vessel and the ventral blood vessel as well as a subneural blood vessel) and the ventral nerve cord, and is surrounded in each segment by a pair of pallial blood vessels that connect the dorsal to the subneural blood vessels.

Many earthworms can eject coelomic fluid through pores in the back in response to stress. The Australian Didymogaster sylvaticus (known as the "blue squirter earthworm") can squirt fluid as high as 30 cm (12 in).

=== Nervous system ===
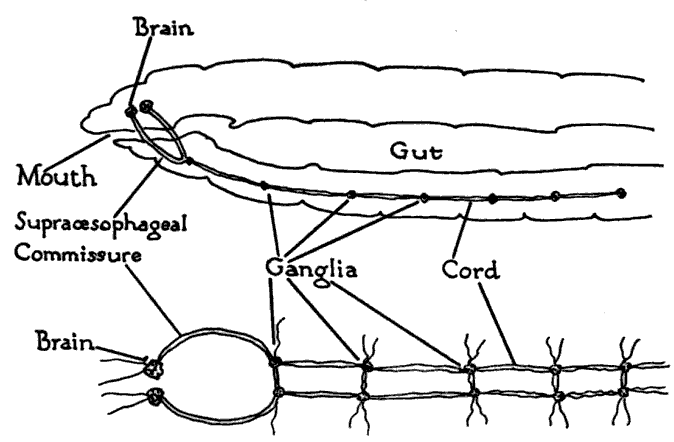
Nervous system of the anterior end of an earthworm

==== Central nervous system ====
The central nervous system (CNS) consists of a bilobed brain (cerebral ganglia, or supra-pharyngeal ganglion), sub-pharyngeal ganglia, circum-pharyngeal connectives and a ventral nerve cord.

Earthworms' brains consist of a pair of pear-shaped cerebral ganglia. These are located in the dorsal side of the alimentary canal in the third segment, in a groove between the buccal cavity and pharynx.

A pair of circum-pharyngeal connectives from the brain encircle the pharynx and then connect with a pair of sub-pharyngeal ganglia located below the pharynx in the fourth segment. This arrangement means the brain, sub-pharyngeal ganglia and the circum-pharyngeal connectives form a nerve ring around the pharynx.

The ventral nerve cord (formed by nerve cells and nerve fibers) begins at the sub-pharyngeal ganglia and extends below the alimentary canal to the most posterior body segment. The ventral nerve cord has a swelling, or ganglion, in each segment, i.e. a segmental ganglion, which occurs from the fifth to the last segment of the body. There are also three giant axons, one medial giant axon (MGA) and two lateral giant axons (LGAs) on the mid-dorsal side of the ventral nerve cord. The MGA is 0.07 mm in diameter and transmits in an anterior-posterior direction at a rate of 32.2 m/s. The LGAs are slightly narrower at 0.05 mm in diameter and transmit in a posterior-anterior direction at 12.6 m/s. The two LGAs are connected at regular intervals along the body and are therefore considered one giant axon.

==== Peripheral nervous system ====
- Eight to ten nerves arise from the cerebral ganglia to supply the prostomium, buccal chamber and pharynx.
- Three pairs of nerves arise from the subpharyngeal ganglia to supply the second, third and fourth segment.
- Three pairs of nerves extend from each segmental ganglion to supply various structures of the segment.

The sympathetic nervous system consists of nerve plexuses in the epidermis and alimentary canal. The nerves that run along the body wall pass between the outer circular and inner longitudinal muscle layers of the wall. They give off branches that form the intermuscular plexus and the subepidermal plexus. These nerves connect with the cricopharyngeal connective.

==== Movement ====
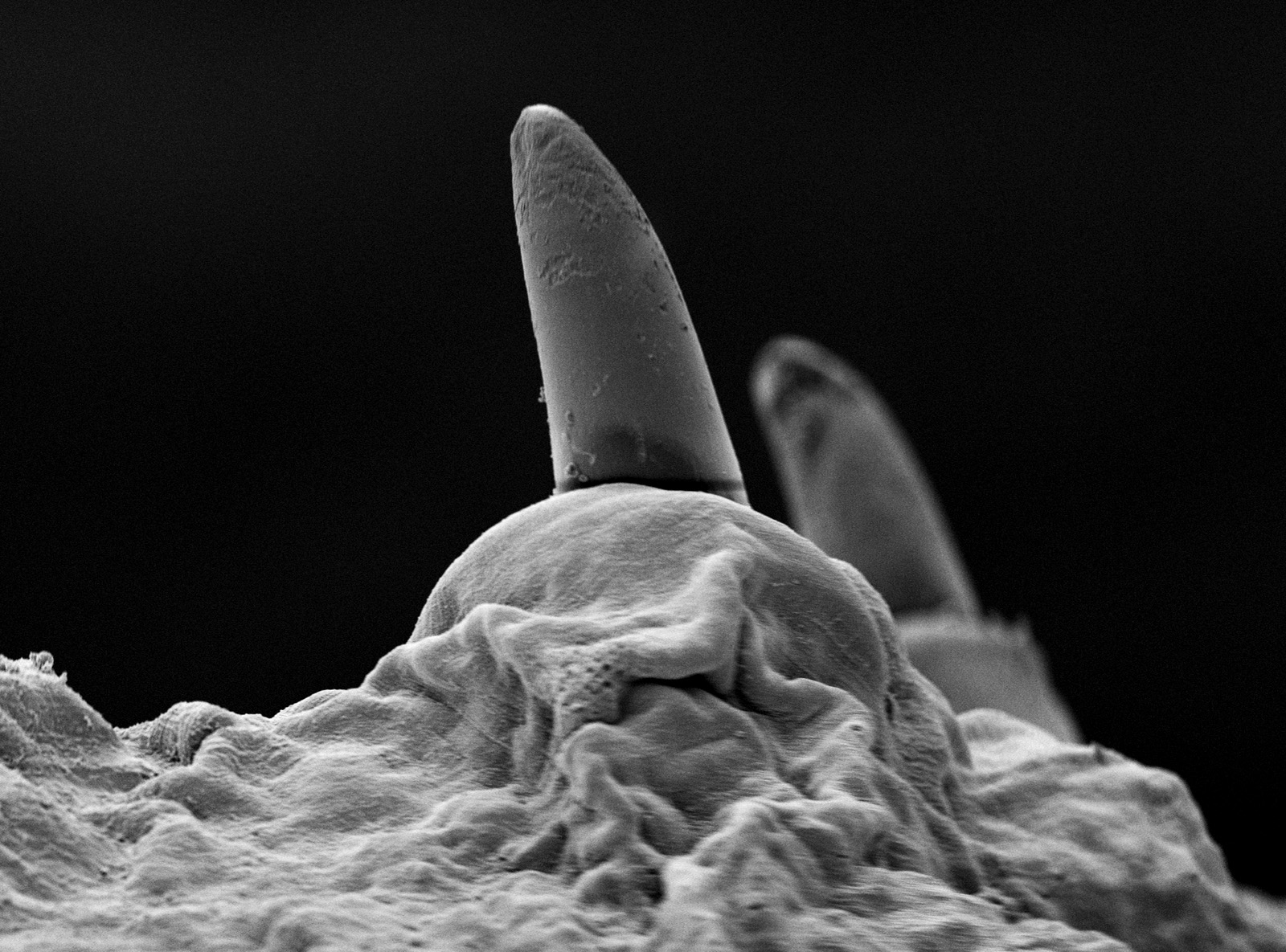
A profile SEM image of Lumbricus terrestris setae, small bristle-like projections that facilitate movement by anchoring the earthworm in the soil.

An earthworm crawling over asphalt.

On the surface, crawling speed varies both within and among individuals. Earthworms crawl faster primarily by taking longer "strides" and a greater frequency of strides. Larger Lumbricus terrestris worms crawl at a greater absolute speed than smaller worms. They achieve this by taking slightly longer strides but with slightly lower stride frequencies.

Touching an earthworm, which causes a "pressure" response as well as (often) an avoidance response to salt toxicity of human skin, stimulates the subepidermal nerve plexus which connects to the intermuscular plexus and causes the longitudinal muscles to contract. This causes the writhing movements observed when a human picks up an earthworm. This behaviour is a reflex and does not require the CNS; it occurs even if the nerve cord is removed. Each segment of the earthworm has its own nerve plexus. The plexus of one segment is not connected directly to that of adjacent segments. The nerve cord is required to connect the nervous systems of the segments.

The giant axons carry the fastest signals along the nerve cord. These are emergency signals that initiate reflex escape behaviours. The larger dorsal giant axon conducts signals the fastest, from the rear to the front of the animal. If the rear of the worm is touched, a signal is rapidly sent forwards causing the longitudinal muscles in each segment to contract. This causes the worm to shorten very quickly as an attempt to escape from a subterranean predator or other potential threat in the surrounding soil. The two medial giant axons connect with each other and send signals from the front to the rear. Stimulation of these causes the earthworm to very quickly retreat, contracting into its burrow and flattening its tail, thus anchoring it in its burrow to escape a surface predator.

The presence of a nervous system is essential for an animal to be able to experience nociception or pain. However, other physiological capacities are also required such as opioid sensitivity and central modulation of responses by analgesics. Enkephalin and α-endorphin-like substances have been found in earthworms. Injections of naloxone (an opioid antagonist) inhibit the withdrawal responses of earthworms. This indicates that opioid substances play a role in sensory modulation, similar to that found in many vertebrates.

==== Learning ====
Since the seminal studies of Charles Darwin on earthworm intelligence much work has been done on the capacity of earthworms, in particular members of the widespread Lumbricus terrestris, to learn, although some doubts were raised about the use of T-maze experiments for demonstrating learning by earthworms.

=== Sensory reception ===
==== Photosensitivity ====
Although some worms have eyes (e.g. leeches, some polychaetes), earthworms do not. However, they do have specialized photosensitive cells called "light cells of Hess". These photoreceptor cells have a central intracellular cavity (phaosome) filled with microvilli. As well as the microvilli, there are several sensory cilia in the which are structurally independent of the microvilli. The photoreceptors are distributed in most parts of the epidermis, but are more concentrated on the back and sides of the worm. A relatively small number occur on the ventral surface of the first segment. They are most numerous in the prostomium, and reduce in density in the first three segments; they are very few in number past the third segment.

==== Epidermal receptor (Sense organ) ====
Epidermal receptors are abundant and distributed all over the epidermis. Each receptor shows a slightly elevated cuticle which covers a group of tall, slender and columnar receptor cells. These cells bear small hairlike processes at their outer ends and their inner ends are connected with nerve fibres. The epidermal receptors are tactile in function (mechanoreceptor) and can respond to touch, cuticle deformation, gravity and sound. They also respond to chemical stimuli (chemoreceptors). Earthworms are extremely sensitive to mechanical vibrations (e.g. trampling, earthquakes) which make them emerge from the soil and crawl at its surface, a reflex used by earthworm harvesters (e.g. fishers) to catch them easily.

==== Buccal receptor (Sense organ) ====
Buccal receptors are located only in the epithelium of the buccal chamber. These receptors are gustatory and olfactory (related to taste and smell, respectively). They also respond to chemical stimuli (chemoreceptors). Irritant substances, such as mustard and allyl isothiocyanate (AITC) are commonly used to sample earthworms by expelling them from the soil using an avoidance response mediated in large part by buccal receptors.

=== Digestive system ===
The gut of the earthworm is a straight tube that extends from the worm's mouth to its anus. It is differentiated into an alimentary canal and associated glands which are embedded in the wall of the alimentary canal itself. The alimentary canal consists of a mouth, buccal cavity (generally running through the first one or two segments of the earthworm), pharynx (running generally about four segments in length), esophagus, crop, gizzard (usually), and intestine.

Food enters at the mouth. The pharynx acts as a suction pump; its muscular walls draw in food. In the pharynx, the pharyngeal glands secrete mucus. Food moves into the esophagus, where calcium (from the blood and ingested from previous meals) is pumped in through calciferous glands to maintain proper blood calcium levels and pH in the blood and food, although more recent studies point to a role of calciferous glands in CO2 regulation through the excretion of stable calcite crystals. From there the food passes into the crop and gizzard. In the gizzard, strong muscular contractions grind the food with the help of mineral particles ingested along with the food. Once through the gizzard, food continues through the intestine for digestion.

The earthworm intestine harbours pepsin to digest proteins, amylase to digest polysaccharides, cellulase to digest cellulose, and lipase to digest fats, but not all these enzymes are produced by the earthorms themselves, depending on species. Earthworms use, in addition to the digestive proteins, a class of surface active compounds called drilodefensins, which help digest plant material by counteracting the inhibitory effects of polyphenols on earthworm gut enzymes. Instead of being coiled like a mammalian intestine, in the earthworm's intestine a large mid-dorsal, tongue-like fold is present, called a typhlosole, with many folds running along its length, increasing its surface area to increase nutrient absorption. The intestine has its own pair of muscle layers like the body, but in reverse order: an inner circular layer within an outer longitudinal layer.

=== Circulatory system ===
Earthworms have a dual circulatory system in which both the coelomic fluid and a closed circulatory system carry the food, waste, and respiratory gases. The closed circulatory system has five main blood vessels: the dorsal (top) vessel, which runs above the digestive tract; the ventral (bottom) vessel, which runs below the digestive tract; the subneural vessel, which runs below the ventral nerve cord; and two lateroneural vessels on either side of the nerve cord.

The dorsal vessel is mainly a collecting structure in the intestinal region. It receives a pair of commissural and dorsal intestines in each segment. The ventral vessel branches off to a pair of ventro-tegumentaries and ventro-intestinals in each segment. The subneural vessel also gives out a pair of commissurals running along the posterior surface of the septum.

The pumping action on the dorsal vessel moves the blood forward, while the other four longitudinal vessels carry the blood rearward. In segments seven through eleven, a pair of aortic arches ring the coelom and acts as hearts, pumping the blood to the ventral vessel that acts as the aorta. The blood consists of ameboid cells (hemocytes) and haemoglobin dissolved in the plasma.

The second circulatory system derives from the chloragogen cells of the digestive system that line the coelom. As the digestive cells become full, they release chloragocytes into the fluid-filled coelom, where they float freely but can pass through the walls separating each segment, moving food to other parts and assist in immunity and wound healing.

=== Excretory system ===
The excretory system contains a pair of nephridia in every segment, except for the first three and the last ones. The three types of nephridia are: integumentary, septal, and pharyngeal. The integumentary nephridia lie attached to the inner side of the body wall in all segments except the first two. The septal nephridia are attached to both sides of the septa behind the 15th segment. The pharyngeal nephridia are attached to the fourth, fifth and sixth segments. The waste in the coelom fluid from a forward segment is drawn in by the beating of cilia of the nephrostome. From there it is carried through the septum (wall) via a tube which forms a series of loops entwined by blood capillaries that also transfer waste into the tubule of the nephrostome. The excretory wastes (urine) are then finally discharged through a pore on the worm's side. This classification has been further refined, with holonephridia, large and occurring as a pair per segment, and meronephridia, small and numerous in each segment, each type being either closed or open, and exonephric or enteronephric according as they discharge their excretory products to the exterior or into the gut.

Earthworm urine contains a protein part derived from the mucus secreted by the body wall, and another part, representing the end products of metabolism excreted by nephridia, made of a mixing of ammonia and urea.

=== Respiration ===
Earthworms have no special respiratory organs. Gases are exchanged through the moist skin and capillaries, where the oxygen is picked up by the haemoglobin dissolved in the blood plasma and carbon dioxide is released.

== Life and physiology ==
At birth, earthworms emerge small but fully formed, lacking only their sex structures which develop in about 60 to 90 days. They attain full size in about one year. Scientists predict that the potential lifespan under field conditions is four to eight years, while the actual lifespan is probably no more than a few months because of intense predation and environmental hazards.

=== Reproduction ===
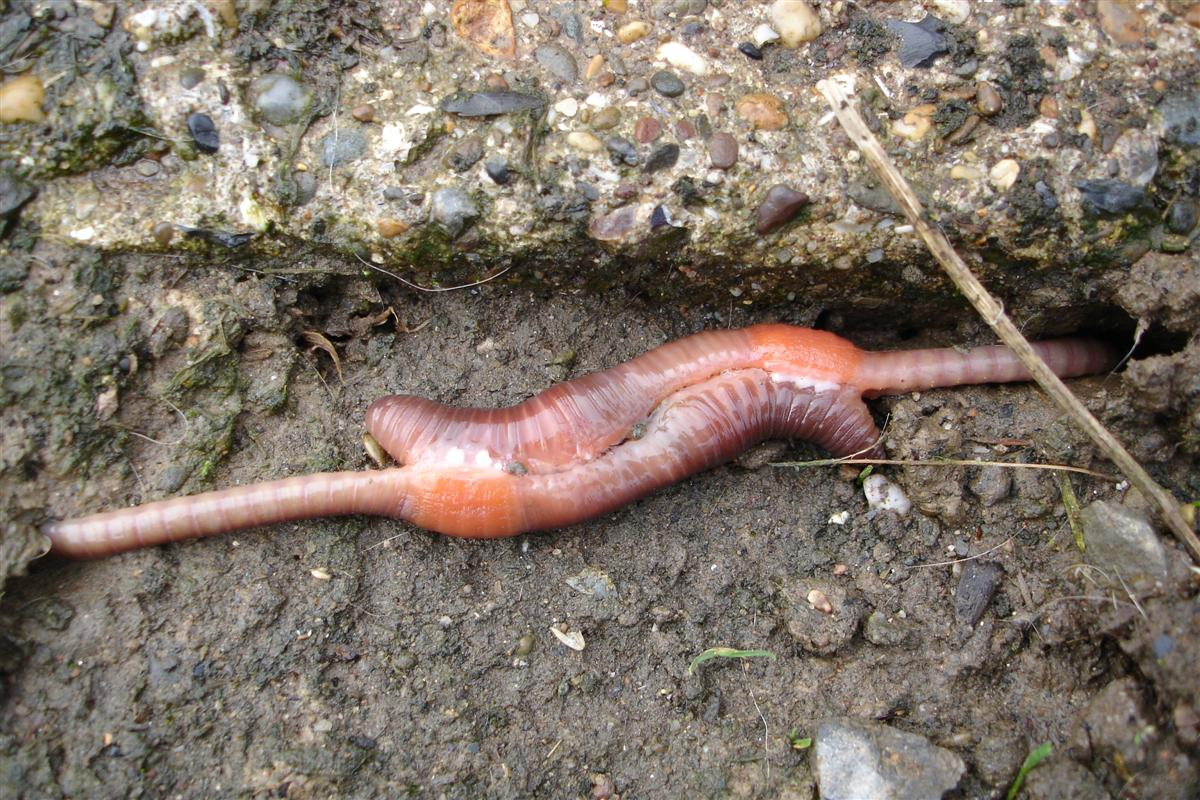
Earthworm copulation

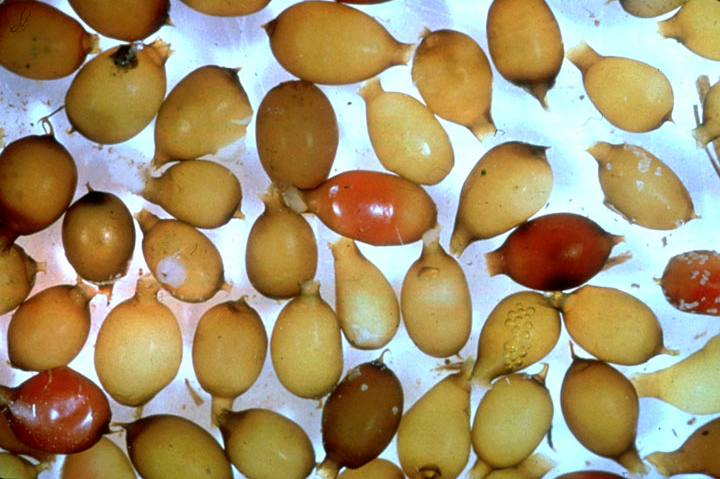
Earthworm cocoons from L. terrestris. Weigh approximately 28 mg each.

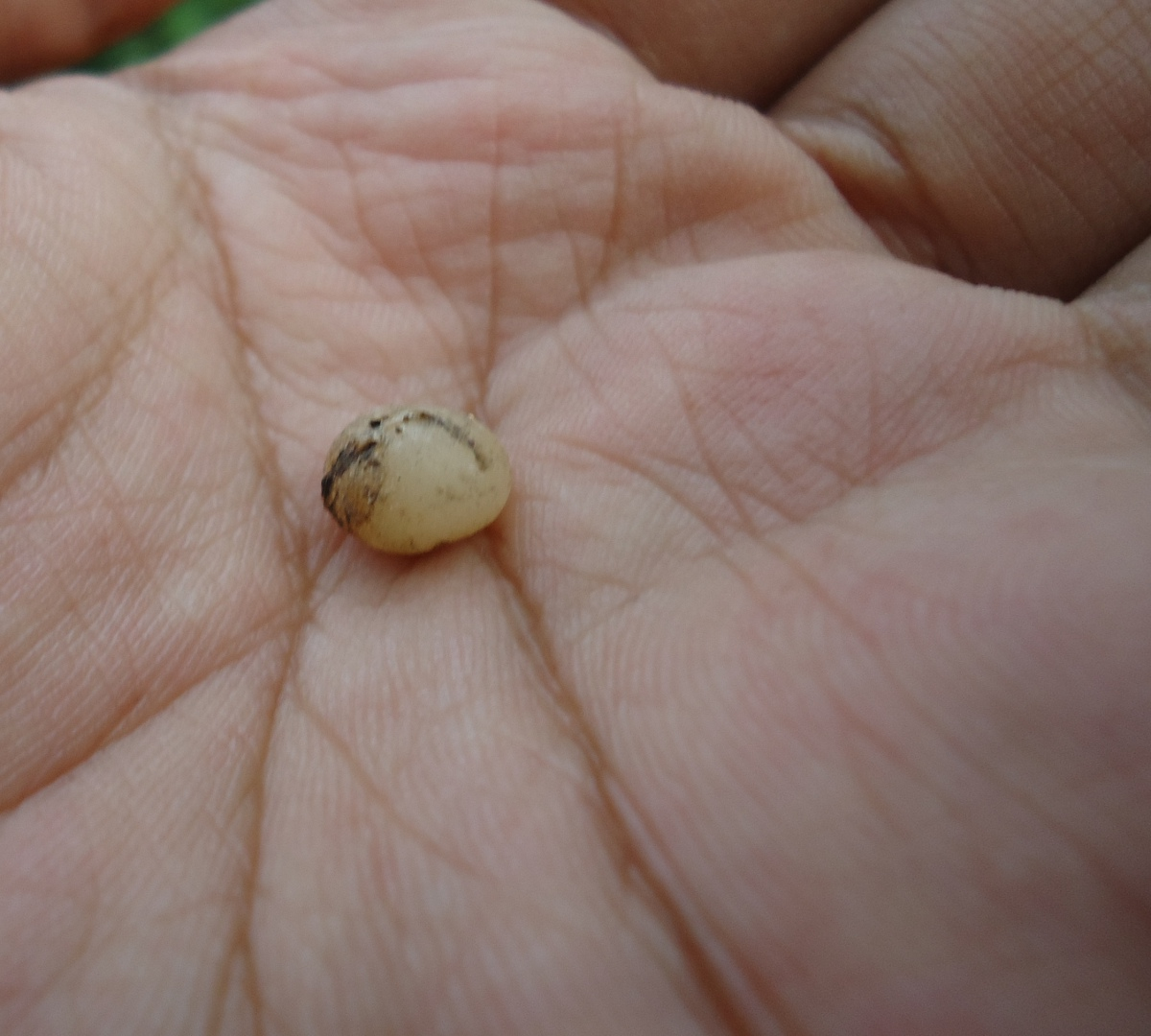
An earthworm cocoon from L. rubellus

Several common earthworm species are mostly parthenogenetic, meaning that growth and development of embryos happens without fertilization. Among lumbricid earthworms, parthenogenesis arose during evolution from sexual relatives. Parthenogenesis in some Aporrectodea trapezoides lineages arose 6.4 to 1.1 million years ago from sexual ancestors. A few species exhibit pseudogamous parthogenesis, meaning that mating is necessary to stimulate reproduction, even though no male genetic material passes to the offspring.

Earthworm mating occurs on the surface, most often at night. Earthworms are hermaphrodites; that is, they have both male and female sexual organs. The sexual organs are located in segments 9 to 15. Earthworms have one or two pairs of testes contained within sacs. The two or four pairs of seminal vesicles produce, store and release the sperm via the male pores. Ovaries and oviducts in segment 13 release eggs via female pores on segment 14, while sperm is expelled from segment 15. One or more pairs of spermathecae are present in segments 9 and 10 (depending on the species) which are internal sacs that receive and store sperm from the other worm during copulation. As a result, segment 15 of one worm exudes sperm into segments 9 and 10 with its storage vesicles of its mate. Some species use external spermatophores for sperm transfer.

In Hormogaster samnitica and Hormogaster elisae transcriptome DNA libraries were sequenced and two sex pheromones, Attractin and Temptin, were detected in all tissue samples of both species. Sex pheromones are probably important in earthworms because they live in a concealed subterranean environment where chemical signalling may play a crucial role in attracting a partner and in facilitating outcrossing. Outcrossing would provide the benefit of masking the expression of deleterious recessive mutations in progeny. (see Complementation).

Copulation and reproduction are separate processes in earthworms. The mating pair overlap front ends ventrally and each exchanges sperm with the other. The clitellum becomes very reddish to pinkish in colour. Sometime after copulation, long after the worms have separated, the clitellum (behind the spermathecae) secretes material which forms a ring around the worm. The worm then backs out of the ring, and as it does so, it injects its own eggs and the other worm's sperm into it. Thus each worm becomes the genetic father of some of their offspring (due to its own sperm transferred to other earthworm) and the genetic mother (offsprings from its own egg cells) of the rest. As the worm slips out of the ring, the ends of the cocoon seal to form a vaguely onion-shaped incubator (cocoon) in which the embryonic worms develop. Hence fertilization is external. The cocoon is then deposited in the soil. After three weeks, 2 to 20 offspring hatch with an average of four. Development is direct; that is, without formation of any larva.

=== DNA repair ===
Exposure of the earthworm Eisenia fetida to ionizing radiation induced DNA strand breaks and oxidized DNA bases. These DNA damages could then be repaired in somatic and spermatogenic cells. Earthworm testis cells are also capable of repairing hydrogen peroxide induced oxidative DNA adducts.

=== Locomotion ===
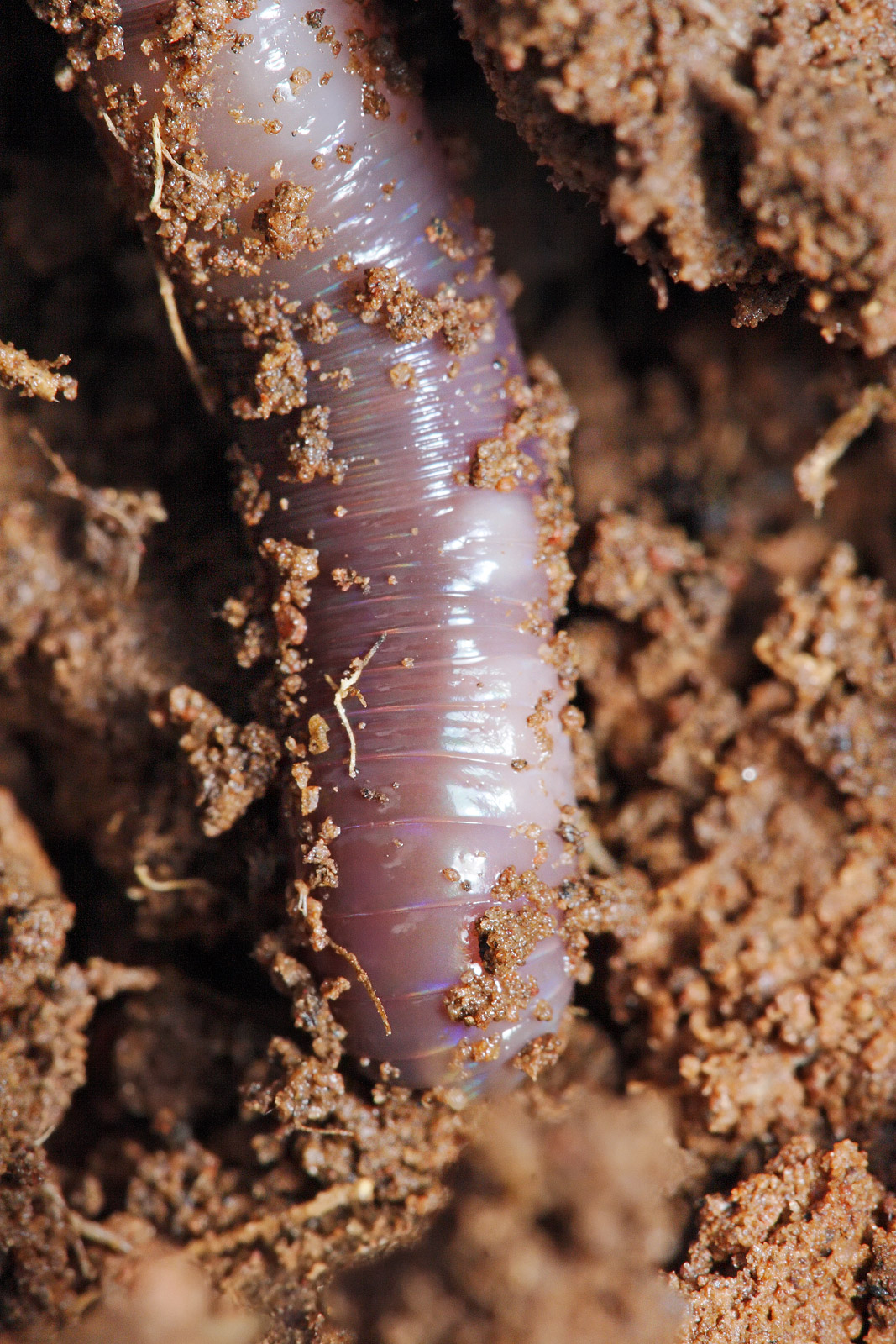
Close up of an earthworm in garden soil

Earthworms travel underground by means of waves of muscular contractions which alternately shorten and lengthen the body (peristalsis). The shortened part is anchored to the surrounding soil by tiny clawlike bristles (setae) set along its segmented length. In all the body segments except the first, last and clitellum, there is a ring of S-shaped setae embedded in the epidermal pit of each segment (perichaetine arrangement). The whole burrowing process is aided by the secretion of lubricating mucus. As a result of their movement through their lubricated tunnels, worms can make gurgling noises underground when disturbed. Earthworms move through soil by several means, depending on species and soil mechanical resistance, either by ingesting it, using root channels or by expanding crevices with force; when forces are measured according to body weight, hatchlings can push 500 times their own body weight whereas large adults can push only 10 times their own body weight.

=== Regeneration ===
Earthworm adults have the ability to regenerate lost segments, but this ability varies between species and the extent of damage as well as genetic factors within the same species. Earthworm regeneration is known from the 17th century, but the cellular mechanisms in play remain incompletetly understood. Regeneration involves epimorphosis, i.e. dedifferentiation of extant tissues followed by generation of new body tissues. The first stage of regeneration after an injury (mostly caused by a predator or agricultural machinery) is wound healing, followed by cell death, formation of a blastema and stem cell proliferation while mechanisms help the newly regenerated segments to determine polarity and positional identity within the body. It has been shown that regeneration takes place only in the presence of an intact clitellum. Earthworms are able to regenerate both anterior (head with brain included) and posterior segments, the intestine participating in head regeneration.

Earthworm extracts have been used for thousand of years as a traditional Chinese medicine for wound healing, and their efficacy has been attested by a recent meta-analysis of 16 published human and animal model studies.

== Taxonomy and distribution ==
Within the world of taxonomy, the stable 'Classical System' of Michaelsen (1900) and Stephenson (1930) was gradually eroded by the controversy over how to classify earthworms, such that Fender and McKey-Fender (1990) went so far as to say, "The family-level classification of the megascolecid earthworms is in chaos." Over the years, many scientists have developed their own classification systems for earthworms, which led to confusion, and these systems have been and still continue to be revised and updated. The classification system used here which was developed by Blakemore (2000), is a modern reversion to the Classical System that is historically proven and widely accepted.

Categorization of a megadrile earthworm into one of its taxonomic families under suborders Lumbricina and Moniligastrida is based on such features as the makeup of the clitellum, the location and disposition of the sex features (pores, prostatic glands, etc.), number of gizzards, and body shape. Currently, over than 6,000 species of terrestrial earthworms are named, as provided in a species name database, but the number of synonyms is unknown.

The families, with their known distributions or origins:

- Acanthodrilidae
- Ailoscolecidae – the Pyrenees and the Southeastern United States
- Almidae – tropical equatorial (South America, Africa, Indo-Asia)
- Benhamiinae – Ethiopian, Neotropical (a possible subfamily of Octochaetidae)
- Criodrilidae – southwestern Palaearctic: Europe, Middle East, Russia and Siberia to Pacific coast; Japan (Biwadrilus); mainly aquatic
- Diplocardiinae – Gondwanan or Laurasian? (subfamily of Acanthodrilidae)
- Enchytraeidae – cosmopolitan but uncommon in tropics (usually classed with Microdriles)
- Eudrilidae – Tropical Africa south of the Sahara
- Exxidae – Neotropical: Central America and the Caribbean
- Glossoscolecidae – Neotropical: Central and South America, Caribbean
- Haplotaxidae – cosmopolitan distribution (usually classed with Microdriles)
- Hormogastridae – Mediterranean
- Kynotidae – Malagasian: Madagascar
- Lumbricidae – Holarctic: North America, Europe, Middle East, Central Asia to Japan
- Lutodrilidae – Louisiana, in the Southeastern United States
- Megascolecidae
- Microchaetidae – Terrestrial in Africa especially South African grasslands
- Moniligastridae – Oriental and Indian subregion
- Ocnerodrilidae – Neotropics, Africa; India
- Octochaetidae – Australasian, Indian, Oriental, Ethiopian, Neotropical
- Octochaetidae – Australasian, Indian, Oriental (subfamily if Benhamiinae is accepted)
- Sparganophilidae – Nearctic, Neotropical: North and Central America
- Tumakidae – Colombia, South America

=== As an invasive species ===
From a total of around 7,000 species, only about 150 species are widely distributed around the world. These are the peregrine or cosmopolitan earthworms. Of the 308 taxa of earthworms found in the United States and Canada, 70 (23%) are introduced species.

== Ecology ==
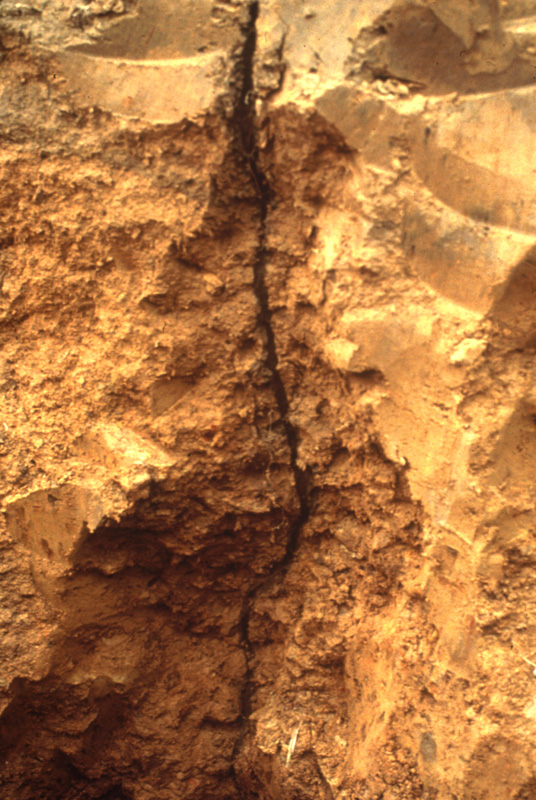
Permanent vertical burrow

Earthworms are classified into three main ecophysiological categories: (1) leaf litter- or compost-dwelling worms that are nonburrowing, live at the soil-litter interface and eat decomposing organic matter (epigeic) e.g. Eisenia fetida; (2) topsoil- or subsoil-dwelling worms that feed on soil, burrow and cast within the soil, creating horizontal burrows in upper 10–30 cm of soil (endogeic); and (3) worms that construct permanent deep vertical burrows which they use to visit the surface to obtain plant material for food, such as leaves (anecic, meaning "reaching up"), e.g. Lumbricus terrestris.

Earthworm populations depend on both physical and chemical properties of the soil, such as temperature, moisture, pH, salts, aeration, and texture, as well as available food, competition, predation, and the ability of the species to reproduce and disperse. One of the most important environmental factors is pH, but earthworms vary in their pH preferences, and through their engineering activities (summarized in the formation of earthworm mull humus) they are able to change pH in order to adapt it to their niche requirements (see niche construction and extended phenotype). Most favour neutral to slightly acidic soils. However, Lumbricus terrestris is still present in a pH of 5.4, Dendrobaena octaedra at a pH of 4.3 and some Megascolecidae are present in extremely acidic humic soils. Soil pH may also influence the numbers of worms that go into diapause. The more acidic the soil, the sooner worms go into diapause, and remain in diapause the longest time at a pH of 6.4.

Earthworms are preyed upon by many species of birds (e.g. robins, starlings, thrushes, gulls, crows), snakes, wood turtles, mammals (e.g. bears, boars, foxes, hedgehogs, pigs, moles) and invertebrates (e.g. ants, flatworms, ground beetles, centipedes, snails, and spiders). Earthworms have many internal parasites, including fungi, protozoa, platyhelminthes, mites, and nematodes; they can be found in the worms' blood, seminal vesicles, coelom, intestine, or in their cocoons.)

The earthworm activity aerates and mixes the soil (bioturbation), and is conducive to mineralization of nutrients and their uptake by vegetation together with incorporating organic matter and linking it to soil minerals. Certain species of earthworm come to the surface and graze on the higher concentrations of organic matter present there, mixing it with the mineral soil (anecic earthworms). Because a high level of organic matter mixing is associated with soil fertility, an abundance of earthworms is generally considered beneficial by farmers and gardeners. As long ago as 1881 Charles Darwin wrote: "It may be doubted whether there are many other animals which have played so important a part in the history of the world, as have these lowly organized creatures." It has long been debated whether earthworms contribute to the disappearance of organic matter in the form of carbon dioxide and mineral nutrients or rather to its preservation in the form of humus. Although these are both aspects of earthworm activities the net effect is important to ascertain, in particular in the frame of organic matter disappearance linked to global warming. It seems that there is now a consensus about the prominent role of earthworms in carbon sequestration due to the fact that part of organic matter is mineralized at or near the soil surface while the major part is incorporated in the deep soil where it is stabilized by links with clay minerals.

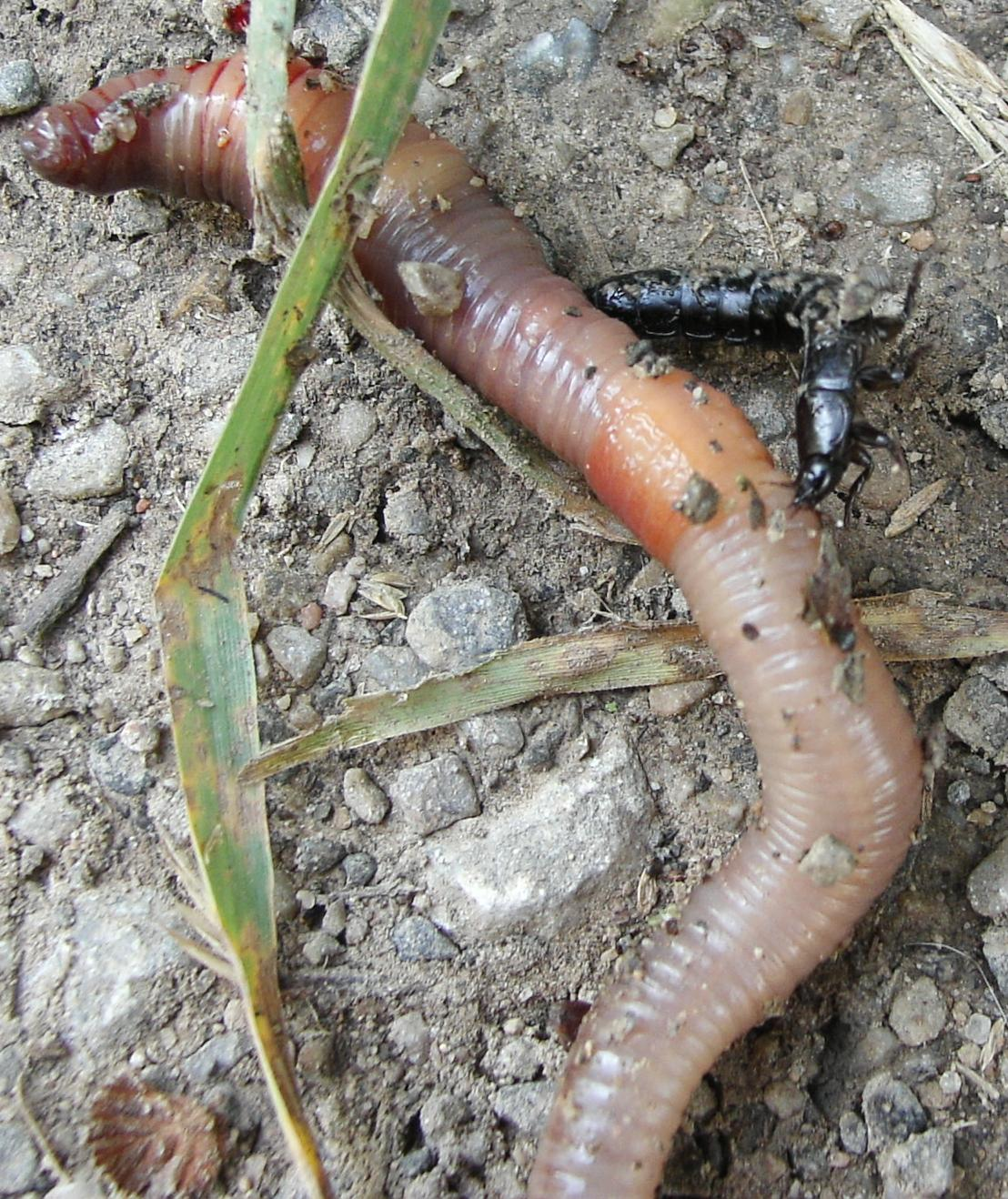
Devil's coach horse beetle preying on Lumbricus sp.

While the main habitat of earthworms is in soil, they are not restricted to this habitat. The brandling worm Eisenia fetida lives in decaying plant matter and manure. Arctiostrotus vancouverensis from Vancouver Island and the Olympic Peninsula is generally found in decaying conifer logs. Aporrectodea limicola, Sparganophilus spp., and several others are found in mud in streams (riparian species). Some species are arboreal, some aquatic and some euryhaline (salt-water tolerant) and littoral (living on the sea-shore), e.g. Pontodrilus litoralis. Even in the soil species, special habitats, such as ultramafic soils derived from serpentine, have an earthworm fauna of their own, e.g. New Caledonian Acanthodrilidae.

Vermicomposting of organic wastes is currently processed using the epigeic Eisenia fetida and Eisenia andrei which are particularly adapted to the consumption of fresh organic matter without deepening in the substrate (contrary to the anecis Lumbricus terrestris) and which tolerate the heat generated in compost heaps. Addition of this humified organic matter to the soil, preferably as a surface mulch, will improve moisture and nutrient availability, with beneficial effects on the soil microflora. It will also provide several species of earthworms with their food and nutrient requirements, and will create the optimum conditions of temperature and moisture that will stimulate their activity, although to a lesser extent than bacterial-mediated compost.

Earthworms are environmental indicators of soil health. Earthworms feed on the decaying matter in the soil and analyzing the microbial contents of their digestive tracts (the earthworm microbiome) gives insight into the overall condition of the soil. The earthworm gut bioaccumulates heavy metals and persistent organic pollutants, causing major health problems, but its microbiome promotes the degradation of many organic pollutants. The population size of earthworms indicates soil quality, as healthy soil would contain a larger number and biomass of earthworms, in particular endogeic and anecic species.

=== Environmental impacts ===
The major benefits of earthworm activities to soil fertility for agriculture can be summarized as:

- Biological: In many soils, earthworms play a major role in the conversion of large pieces of organic matter into rich humus, thus improving soil fertility. This is achieved by the worm's actions (mainly of anecics) of pulling below the surface deposited organic matter such as leaf fall or manure, either for food or to plug its burrow. Once in the burrow, the worm will shred the leaf, partially digest it and mingle it with the earth. Worm casts (see bottom right) can contain 40 percent more humus than the top 9 inches (230 mm) of soil in which the worm is living.

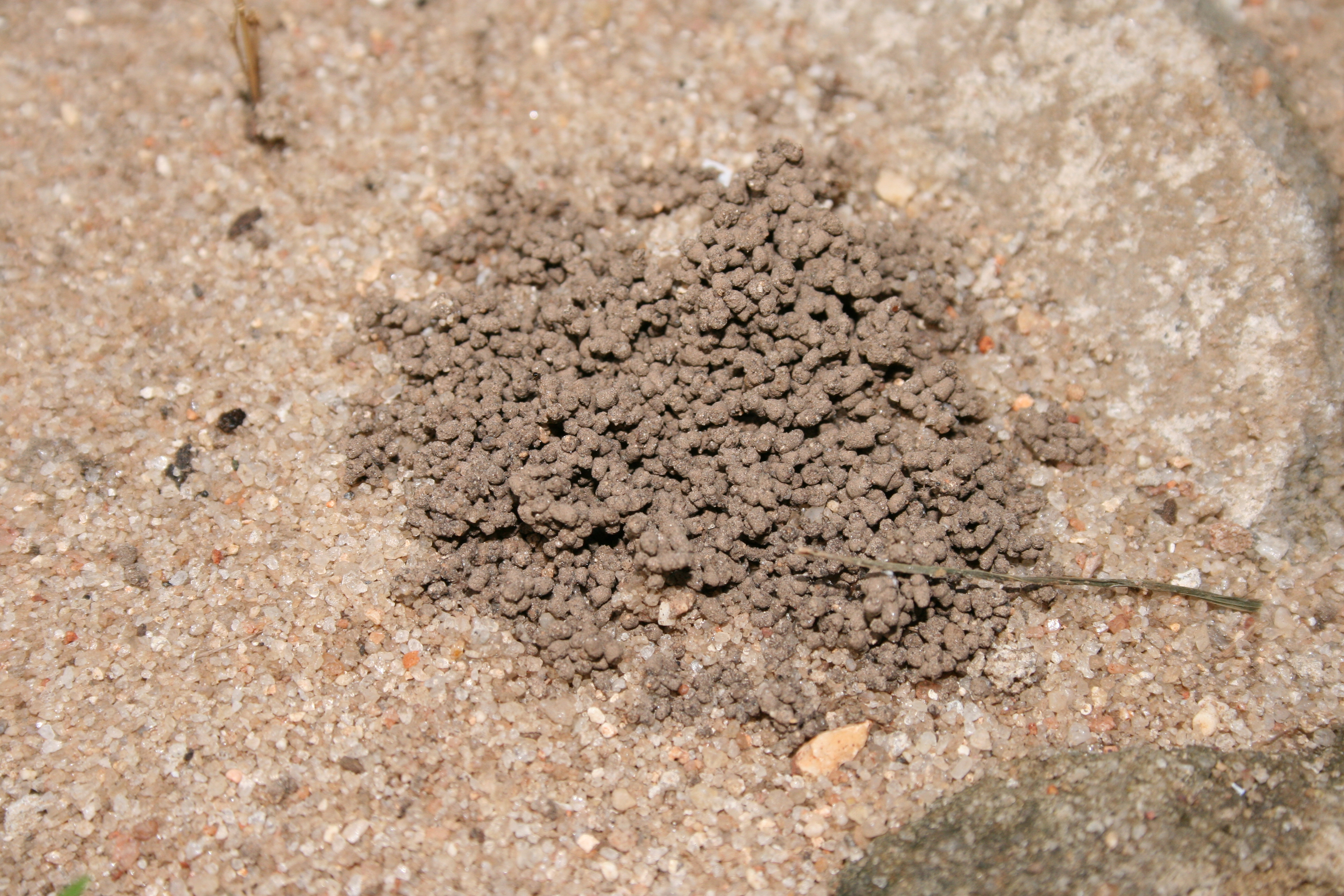
Faeces in the form of casts

- Chemical: In addition to dead organic matter, the earthworm also ingests any other soil particles that are small enough, including sand grains up to 1/20 inch (1.3 mm), into its gizzard, wherein those minute fragments of grit (gastroliths) grind everything into a fine paste which is then digested in the intestine, increased surface area favouring microbial colonization and enzymatic action. When the worm excretes this paste in the form of casts, deposited on the surface or deeper in the soil, carbon, nitrogen and phosphorus are increased compared to the bulk soil and nutrients are changed to a plant-available form, increasing locally soil fertility. In conditions where humus is plentiful, the weight of casts produced may be greater than 4.5 kilograms (9.9 lb) per worm per year.
- Physical: The earthworm's burrowing creates a multitude of channels through the soil and is of great value in maintaining the soil structure, enabling processes of aeration and drainage. Permaculture co-founder Bill Mollison points out that by sliding in their tunnels, earthworms "act as an innumerable army of pistons pumping air in and out of the soils on a 24-hour cycle (more rapidly at night)". Thus, the earthworm not only creates passages for air and water to traverse the soil, i.e. increases soil porosity, but also as a soil engineer its bioturbation activities modify the vital organic component that makes a soil healthy. Earthworms promote the formation of nutrient-rich casts that have high soil aggregation (good soil structure) and soil fertility and quality. In podzol soils, after conversion of softwood to hardwood forest or after earthworm invasion, these animals can obliterate the characteristic banded appearance of the soil profile by mixing the organic (LFH), eluvial (E) and upper illuvial (B) horizonss to create a single dark Ap horizon.

Earthworms accelerate nutrient cycling in the soil-plant system through fragmention and mixing, physical grinding and chemical digestion of plant debris. However, the earthworm's existence cannot be taken for granted. Dr. W. E. Shewell-Cooper observed "tremendous numerical differences between adjacent gardens", and worm populations are affected by a host of environmental factors, many of which can be influenced by good management practices on the part of the gardener or farmer.

Darwin estimated that arable land contains up to 53,000 per acre (130,000/ha) of worms, but more recent research has produced figures suggesting that even poor soil may support 250,000 per acre (620,000/ha), whilst rich fertile farmland may have up to 1,750,000 per acre (4,300,000/ha), meaning that the weight of earthworms beneath a farmer's soil could be greater than that of the livestock upon its surface. Richly organic topsoil populations of earthworms are much higher, averaging 500 per square metre (46/sq ft) and up to 400 g/m2, such that, for the 7 billion of us, each person alive today has support of 7 million earthworms.

The ability to break down organic materials and excrete concentrated nutrients makes the earthworm a functional contributor in restoration projects. In response to ecosystem disturbances, some sites have utilized earthworms to prepare soil for the return of native flora. Research from the Station d'écologie Tropicale de Lamto (Ivory Coast) asserts that the earthworms positively influence the rate of macroaggregate formation (Soil structure#Granular|granular structure), an important feature for soil structure. The stability of aggregates in response to water was also found to be improved when constructed by earthworms.

Though not fully quantified yet, greenhouse gas emissions (carbon dioxide, nitrous oxide, methane) of earthworms, direct or mediated by their strong influence on soil microbial communities, likely contribute to global warming, especially since top-dwelling earthworms increase the speed of carbon cycles and have been spread by humans into many new geographies.

== Threats ==
Nitrogenous fertilizers tend to create acidic conditions, which are fatal to the worms, and dead specimens are often found on the surface following the application of various pesticides, among which insecticides and fungicides are the most toxic. In Australia, changes in farming practices such as the application of superphosphates on pastures and a switch from pastoral farming to arable farming had a devastating effect on populations of the giant Gippsland earthworm Megascolides australis, leading to their classification as a protected species. Globally, certain earthworm populations have been devastated by deviation from organic production and the spraying of synthetic fertilizers and biocides, with at least three species now listed as extinct, but many more endangered.

== Economic impact ==
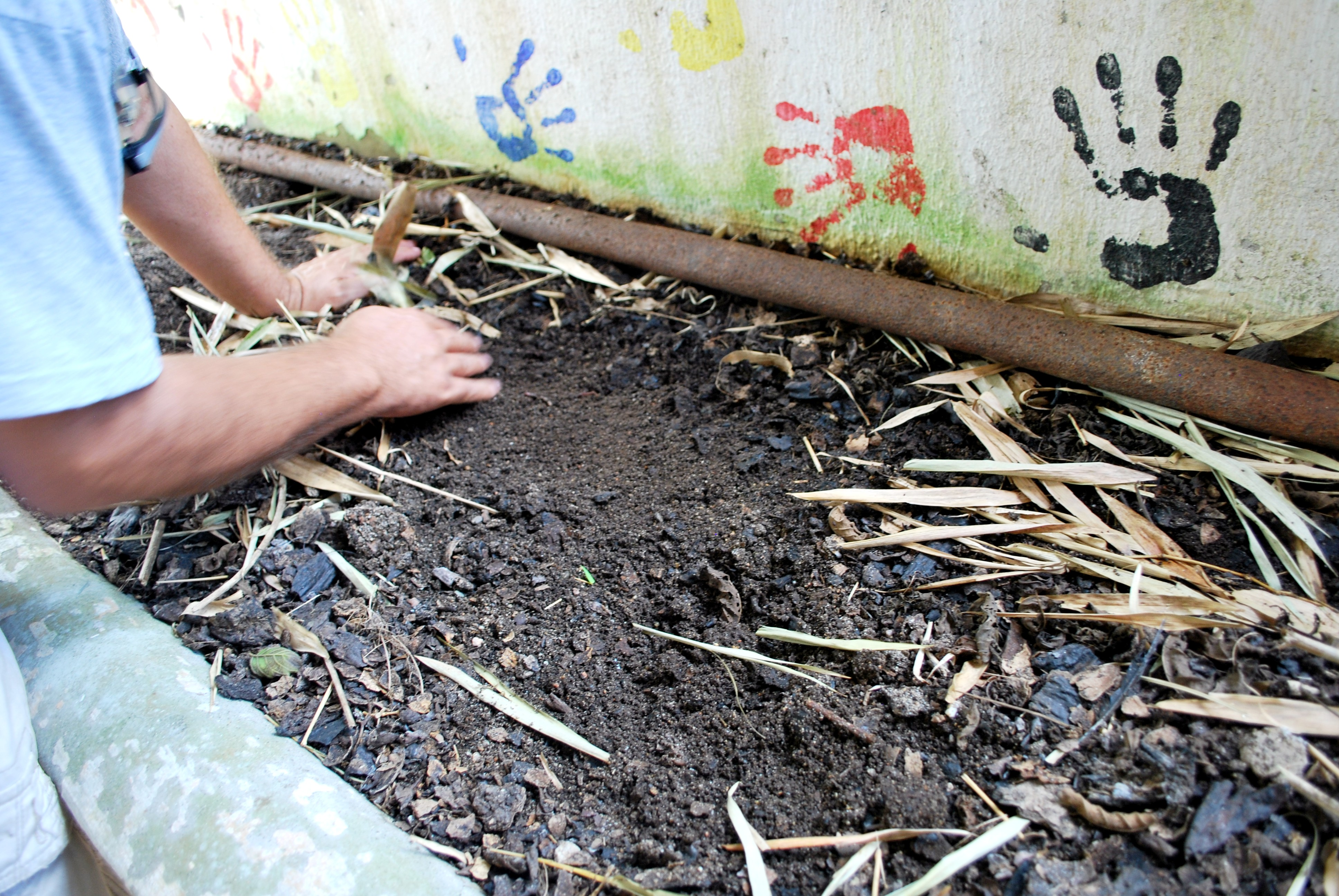
Earthworms being raised at La Chonita Hacienda in Mexico

Various worms are used in vermiculture, the practice of feeding organic waste to earthworms to transform it into vermicompost. These are usually Eisenia fetida (or its close relative Eisenia andrei) commonly known as the brandling worm, or tiger worm or red wiggler. They are distinct from soil-dwelling earthworms, living mainly in manure heaps. In the tropics, the African nightcrawler Eudrilus eugeniae and the Indian blue Perionyx excavatus are used.

Earthworms are sold all over the world; the market is sizable. Doug Collicutt states, "In 1980, 370 million worms were exported from Canada, with a Canadian export value of $13 million and an American retail value of $54 million."

Earthworms provide an excellent source of protein for fish, fowl, and pigs, but have also been used traditionally for human consumption. Noke is a culinary term used by the Māori of New Zealand to refer to earthworms, which they consider delicacies for their chiefs.

== See also ==
- Drilosphere, the part of the soil influenced by earthworm secretions and castings
- The Formation of Vegetable Mould through the Action of Worms, an 1881 book by Charles Darwin
- Soil life
- Vermicompost
- Vermifilter
- Vermifilter toilet
- Worm charming
