= Clitellum =

Anatomic feature

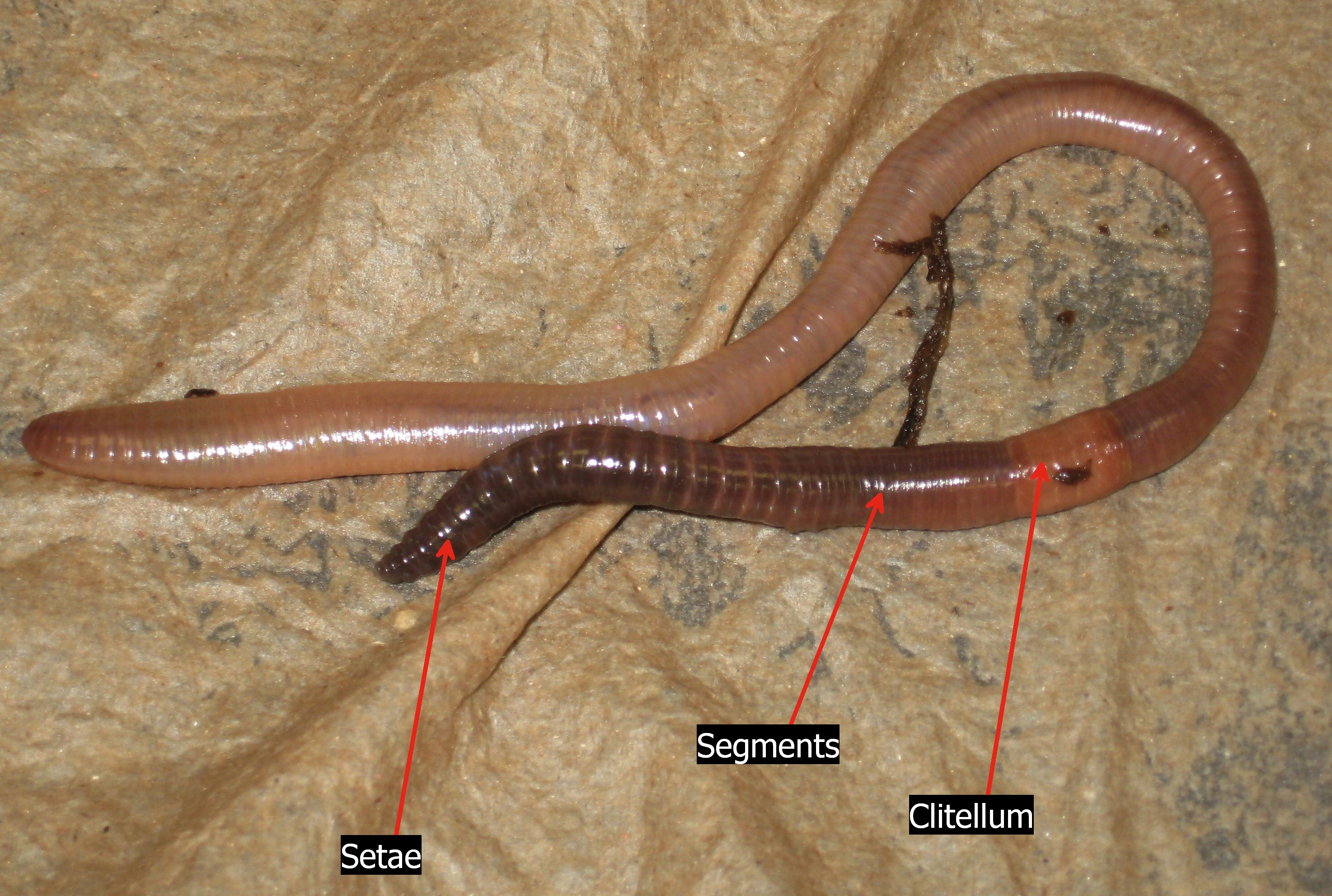
Earthworm with clitellum lablelled.

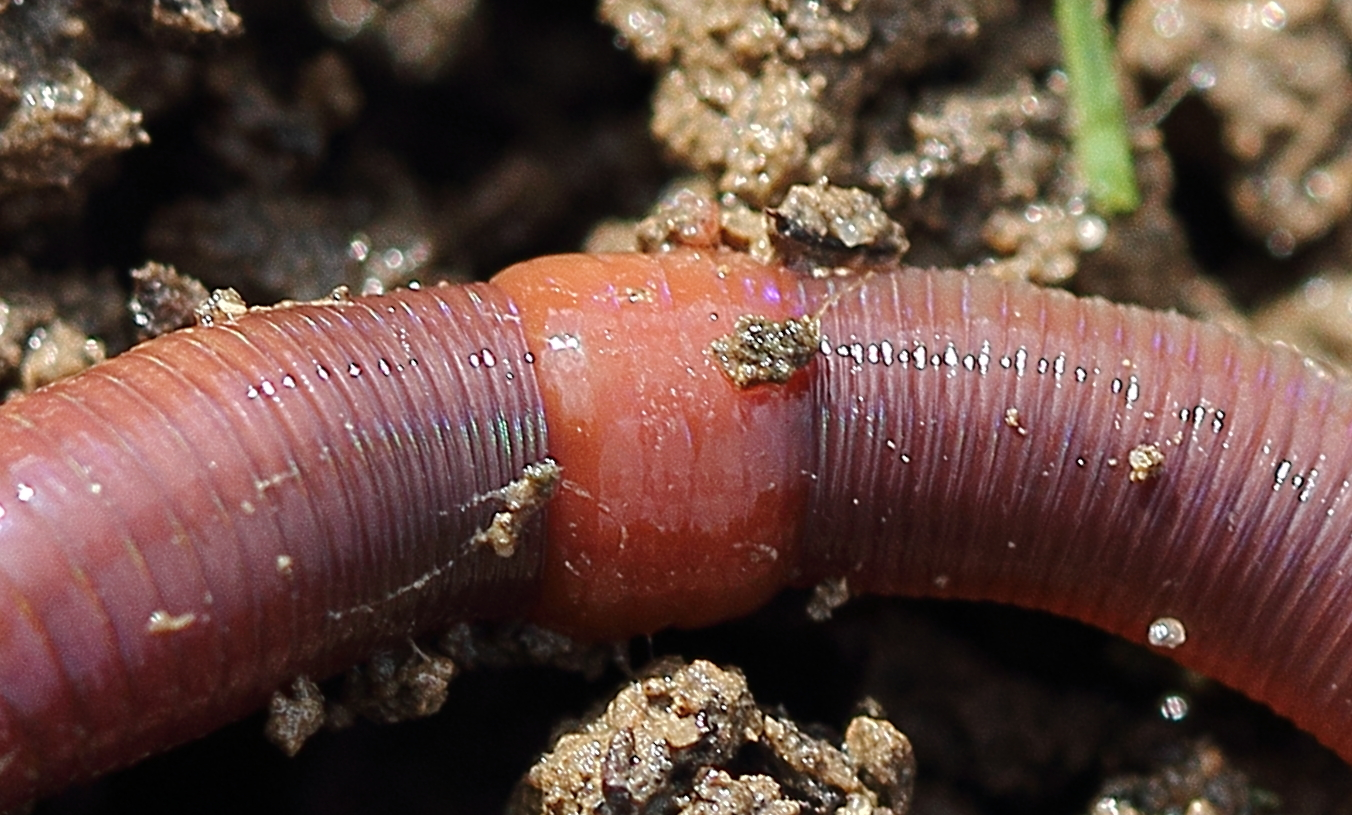
Close-up of the clitellum of a Lumbricus rubellus

The clitellum is a thickened glandular and non-segmented section of the body wall near the head in earthworms and leeches that secretes a viscid sac in which eggs are stored. It is located near the anterior end of the body, between the fourteenth and seventeenth segments. The number of the segments to where the clitellum begins and the number of segments that make up the clitellum are important for identifying earthworms. In microdrile earthworms, the clitellum has only one layer, resulting in a smaller quantity of eggs than that of the megadrile earthworms, which have larger multi-layered clitellum that have special cells that secrete albumin into the worm's egg sac.

The clitellum is part of the reproductive system of clitellates, a subgroup of annelids which contains oligochaetes (earthworms) and hirudineans (leeches). The clitellum is a thick, saddle-like ring found in the epidermis (skin) of the worm, usually with a light-colored pigment. To form a cocoon for its eggs, the clitellum secretes a viscous fluid. This organ is used in sexual reproduction of some annelids, such as leeches.

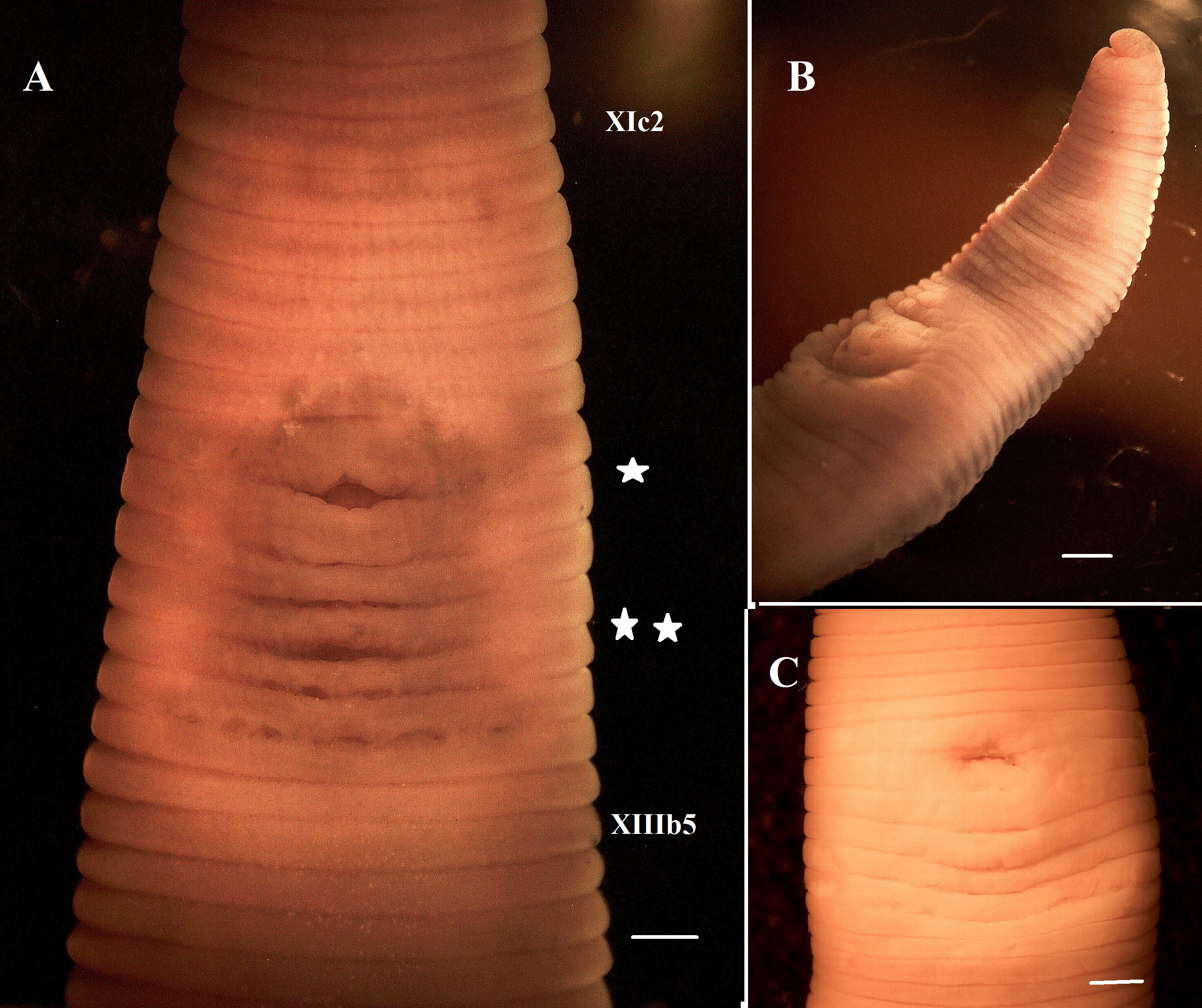
Copulatory complex of Philobdella floridana from North Carolina, South Carolina and Georgia. A, Lake Phelps, NC (Phg-2). Note distinct clitellum from annulus XIc2 to annulus XIIIb5, as indicated. B, Santee Swamp, SC (Psa-1). Specimen slightly distorted during preservation, showing deep saddle-shaped depression. Note prehensile upper ‘lip’ covering mouth. C, Okefenokee Swamp, GA (Pfl-2). Single star, male gonopore; double star, female gonopore, three annuli posterior to male. Scale bars, 1.0 mm.

In earthworms, the clitellum can only be seen when the worm is sexually mature. It may be white, orange-red or reddish-brown in colour. Earthworms are ready to mate when their clitellum is orange. In leeches, the clitellum appears during mating season, where it is used for both sexual reproduction and the secretion of a cocoon for the eggs. Its color is usually slightly lighter than that of the body of the annelid. Occasionally, living segments of the worm will be shed with the clitellum.

== See also ==
- Earthworm reproduction
