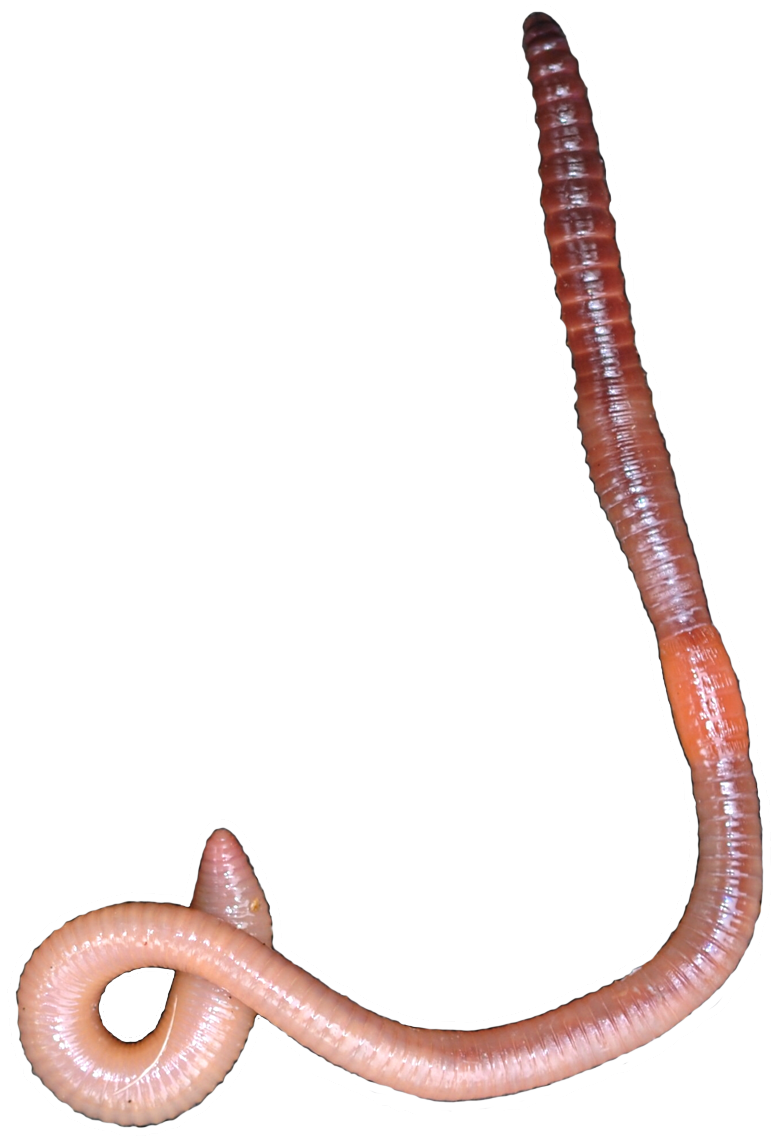
- Lumbricus terrestris, a member of Crassiclitellata

Scientific classification
- Kingdom: Animalia
- Phylum: Annelida
- Clade: Pleistoannelida
- Clade: Sedentaria
- Class: Clitellata
- Order: Opisthopora
- Suborder: Crassiclitellata

Families
- See text

= Crassiclitellata =

Order of annelid worms

Crassiclitellata (common name, earthworms) is an order of annelids belonging to the class Clitellata..

Despite its common name, not all crassiclitellata are what most people mean when referring to earthworms- those are the species that belong in this order's lumbricidae family, whose Lumbricus terrestris species represent the standard garden worms and nightcrawlers familiar to most people

== Etymology ==
This order's name, crassiclitellata, can literally mean "thick saddle." Broken down, "crassi" from Latin word for "thick" or "fat," and "clitellata," stemming form the Latin word for a raised bump, signifying the band near the head of the worm. Thus, this order can be characterized by the types of annelids whose clitellum is more bulbous than the rest of the Clitellata class.

== Families ==
Crassiclitellata includes the following families:

- Acanthodrilidae
- Benhamiidae
- Eudrilidae
- Hippoperidae
- Komarekionidae
- Lumbricidae
- Lutodrilidae
- Megascolecidae
- Microchaetidae
- Sparganophilidae
- Tumakidae
- Typhaeidae
