= Drilodefensins =

Class of chemical compounds

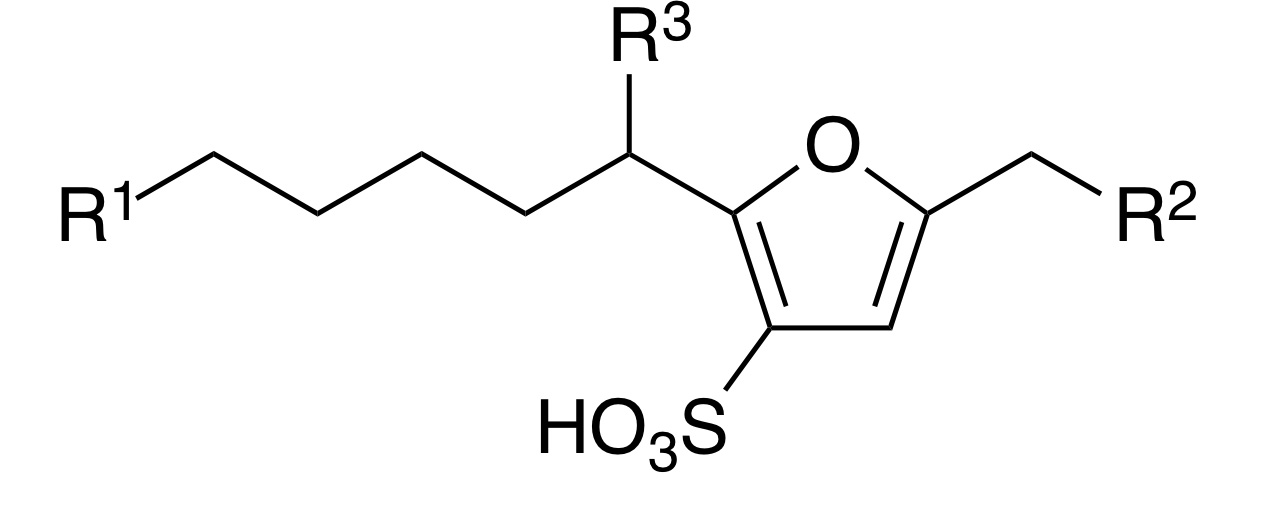
General chemical structure of drilodefensins

Drilodefensins are a class of molecules first found in the gut of earthworms. They belong to the class of dialkylfuransulfonic acids and so far six different homologs have been found.

== Origin ==
They were named based on megadrile, the group of terrestrial clitellate annelids including earthworms. The major occurring drilodefensin in earthworms is drilodefensin 1 (hexylethylfuransulfonic acid, former abbreviated as HEFS).

== Mechanism of action ==
Based on their structure they act as biological surfactants involved in earthworm digestive functioning and protect the earthworm digestive system from the negative impact of plant compounds called polyphenols which do protein-binding.
