= Komarekiona =

Conservation status
- Data Deficient (IUCN 3.1)

Scientific classification
- Kingdom: Animalia
- Phylum: Annelida
- Clade: Pleistoannelida
- Clade: Sedentaria
- Class: Clitellata
- Order: Opisthopora
- Suborder: Crassiclitellata
- Family: Komarekionidae; G. E. Gates, 1974
- Genus: Komarekiona; G. E. Gates, 1974
- Species: K. eatoni

Binomial name
- Komarekiona eatoni G. E. Gates, 1974

Species of annelid

Komarekiona eatoni, or the Kentucky earthworm, is a terrestrial species of nearctic Annelid found in the southwestern United States, especially near the Appalachian Mountains. Komarekionidae is one of the few endemic Megadrile families in North America north of Mexico.

It is the only species in the family Komarekionidae and the genus Komarekiona. The genus and family are named in honor of a Director of Tall Timbers Research Station and Land Conservancy.

Notably, the worms that live to the east of the Great Smoky Mountains reproduce sexually and those west of the mountains reproduce by parthenogenesis.

The species was declared threatened in 2013, but since then has been considered data deficient.

== Range ==
Due to the Last Glacial Maximum during the Pleistocene, there are very few endemic species of earthworm in North America. The range of the species is thus further south, as are most earthworm species on the continent.

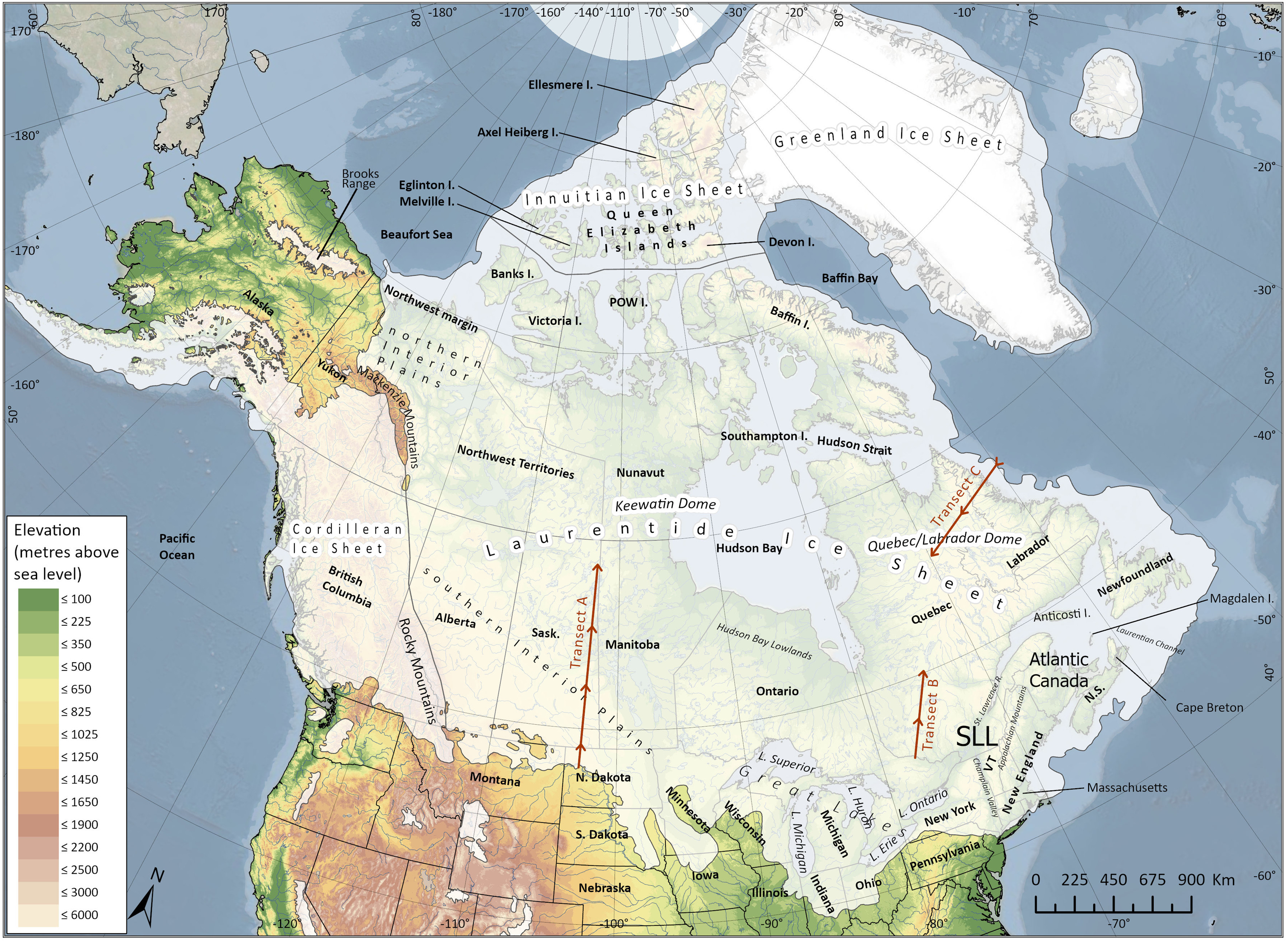
K. eatoni is the only species of its family to survive the Last Glacial Maximum

The earthworm has been found in several states in the southeast of the United States. It ranges through Kentucky, Illinois, Georgia, Tennessee, Virginia, Indiana, and North Carolina.

So far it has only been found in the unglaciated portions of Indiana. Some believe that Illinois and Indiana are not within the species' natural range.

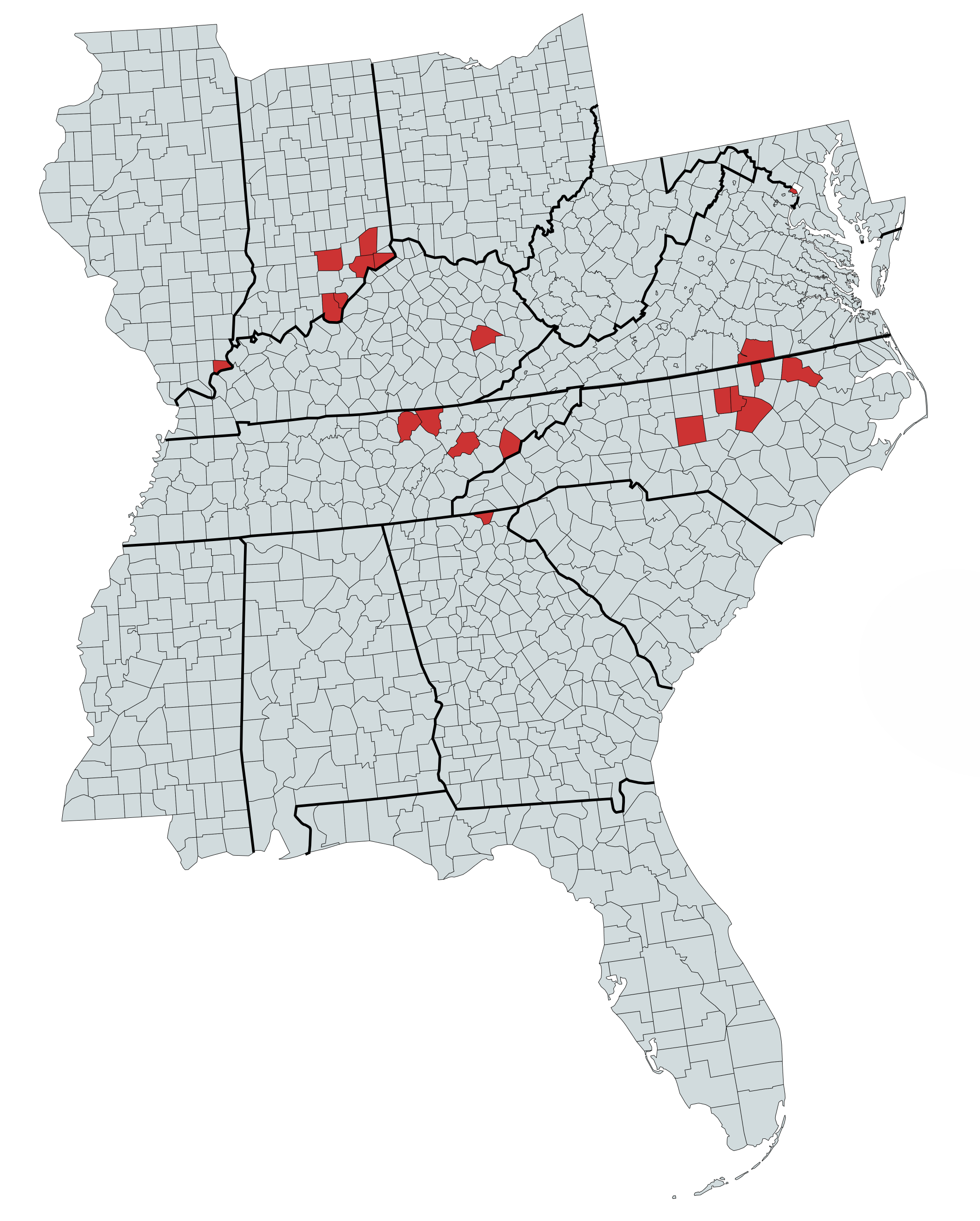
A map of the counties where K. eatoni has been documented

Its physiographic regions are the Appalachian Highlands, Southern Piedmont, and Ridge-and-Valley Appalachians.

== Phylogeny and taxonomy ==
11,000 years ago, during the Late Wisconsin stage of the Pleistocene glaciation, most species of earthworms went extinct. Komarekiona eatoni is believed to be the only species of its family to have survived.

In phylogenetic analyses, Komarekiona forms a clade with Sparganophilus. The two families diverged an estimated 69.57-110 Mya.

K. eatoni is the only species in the family Komarekionidae and the genus Komarekiona, though some sources have combined it into the family Hormogastridae. Other sources place it with Ailoscolecidae. However, later sources have pointed out critical differences between Ailoscolecidae and Komarekionidae.

== Description ==
=== Morphology ===
K. eatoni worms are between 5–110 millimetres (0.20–4.33 in) long and have a diameter of 5–6 millimetres (0.20–0.24 in). Specimens have between 86 and 163 segments. Its color is whiteish with a "slight graying anterior and posterior margins of the segments," especially near its nephropores. Its setae are small and are barely protuberant from the body wall. They are often not seen on the first few segments. It has three pairs of spermathecal pores. It lacks genital marking and tumescences as the Megascolecidae and Lumbricidae tend to have respectively.

=== Anatomy ===
Its ovaries occur collectively. K. eatoni lacks dorsal pores, calciferous glands (which produce calcium carbonate and fix carbon dioxide), and a terminal esophageal valve. It also "has a strong gizzard in vi, and meganephridia present anterior to xiii." It has at least 143,281 contigs and one extracellular CYGB globin gene.

==== Multisexuality ====
Specimens east of the Great Smoky Mountains are known to reproduce sexually, as a "brilliant spermatozoal iridescence on the male funnels and in the spermathecal coagulum" has been noted. However, those west of the mountains lack spermathecae and testes and have rudimentary seminal vesicles. This indicates that the western organisms reproduce asexually. The author noting this discovery described this as mutagenesis, meaning: "A permanent change in the method of reproduction by an organism, as when a portion of the range is isolated from the main gene pool or centre of origin; ex. nearctic earthworm Komarekiona eatoni."

== Biology ==
=== Habitat ===
The earthworm is endogeic, meaning it lives in the soil and makes horizontal burrows. Other sources describe the species as epiendogeic worm. The species is easily found and dug up with a small hand pick "from the surface centimetres of the soil profile." Others have noted its presence in the mineral soil. It has frequently been found in formalin extraction sampling efforts.

The species prefers less acidic environments. It is associated with soil high in organic matter that are mesic habitats. Its preferred soil great groups are Dystrochrepts and Hapludults. The worms are commonly found among "leaf litter, under debris, logs, and rocks etc."—areas that notably hold onto precipitation longer Komarekiona has been found in hardwood litter, as well. It is also found along roadsides, in sinkholes, and near sewage installations. It is known to live in caves as well, such as Brown's hole in Hardin County, Illinois.

=== Reproduction ===
The earthworm seems to breed during the winter. This likely has to do with the increase of precipitation in its regions during winter months. It appears to go into aestivation during the drier parts of the year, unlike many other earthworm species in their range. K. eatoni specimens found east of the Great Smoky Mountains are amphimictic and those west of the mountains are parthenogenetic.

== Ecology ==
It has been associated with Tsuga canadensis, Rhododendron maximum, and Liriodendron tulipifera. However, R. maximum has been found to create drier soils and phenolic repellants and toxins that may keep worms like K. eatoni away. It tends to be found in forest regions of Loblolly-Shortleaf pines, Oak-Hickory, and Oak-Pine trees. Though, it was stated earlier that the earthworm is found in deciduous forests.

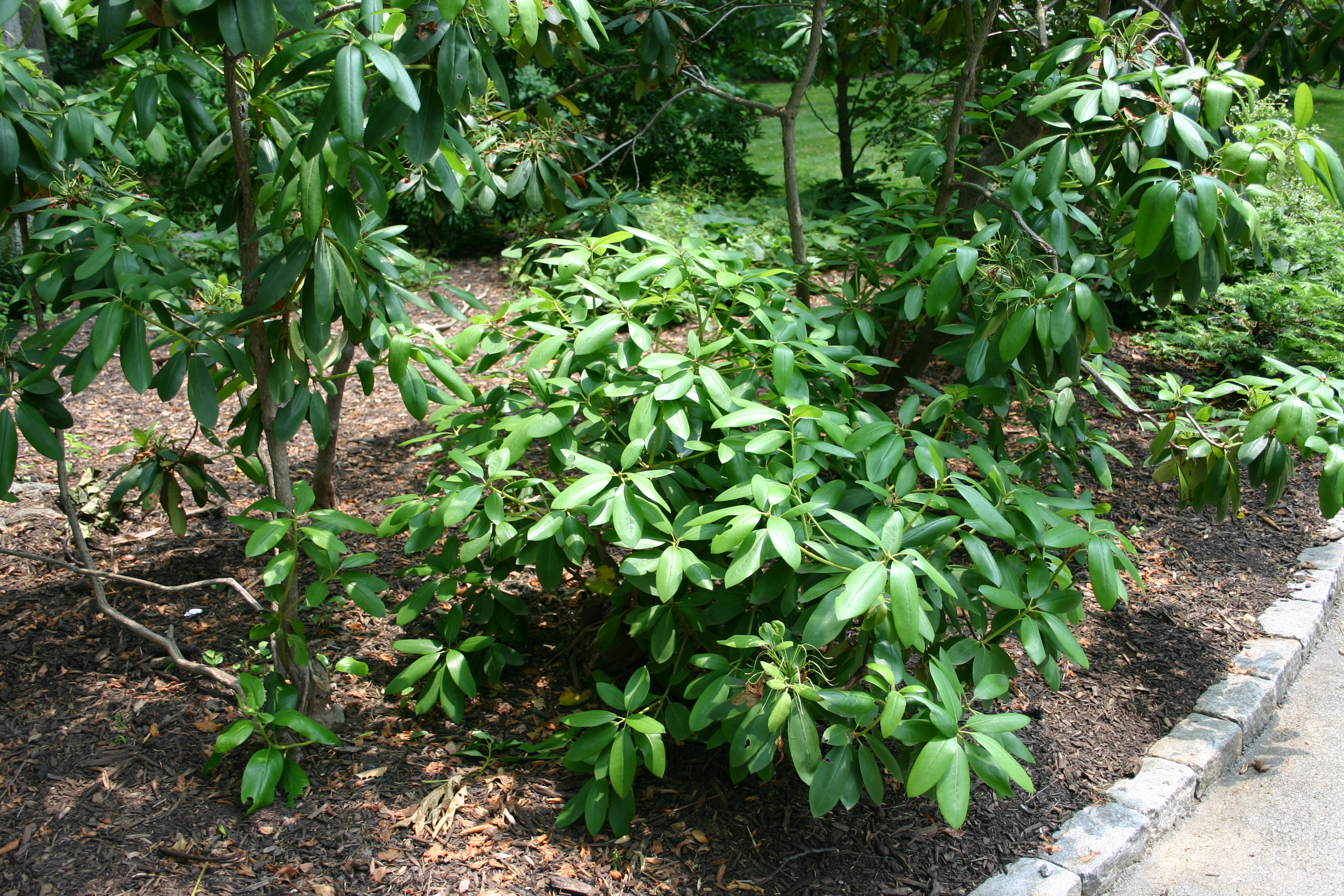
R. maximum acidifies and dries its surrounding soil, perhaps repelling the Kentucky earthworm.

It has also been associated with vermivorous snakes, as there is overlap in the ranges of the worm and Carphophis amoenus, Diadophis punctatus, and Thamnophis sirtalis.

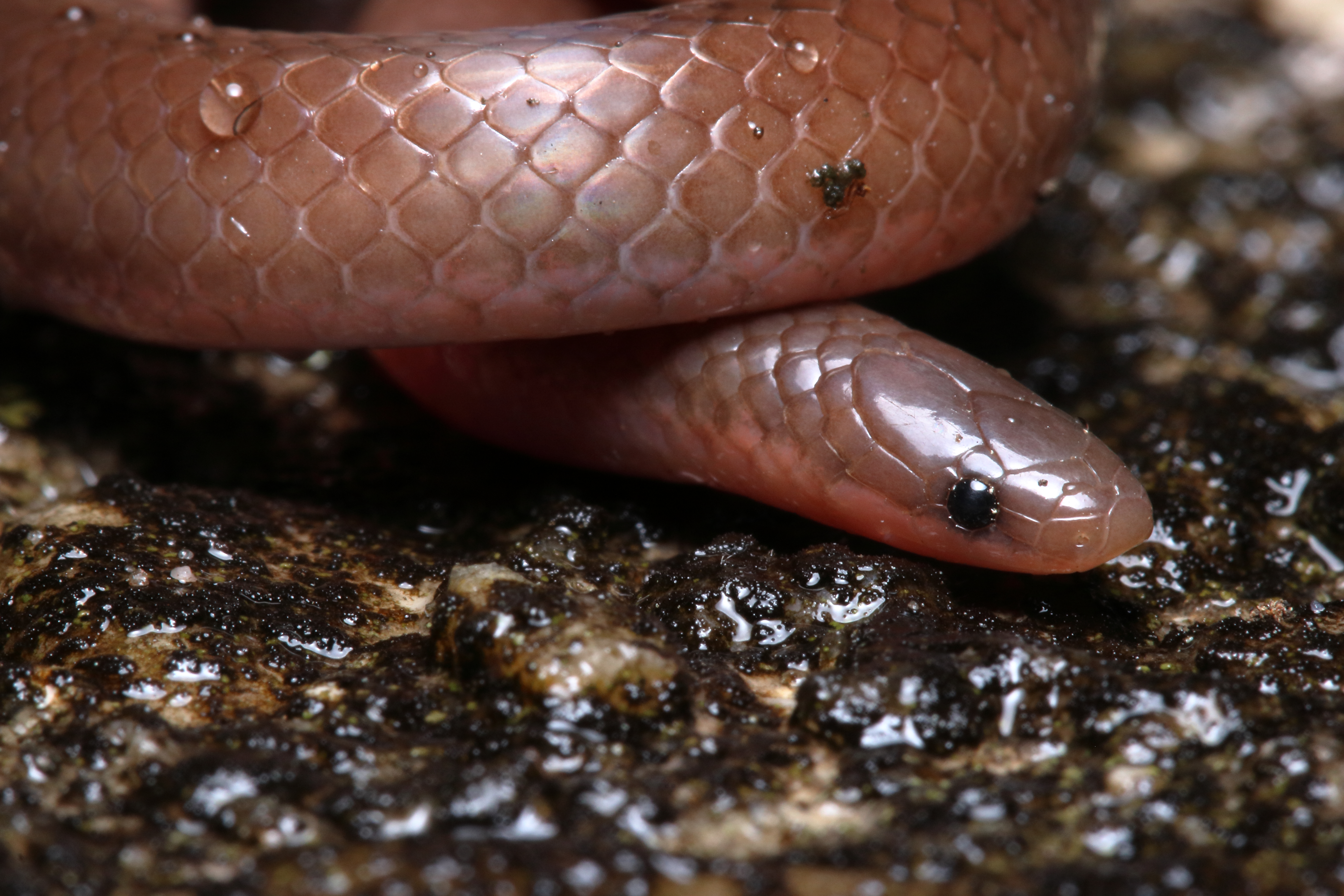
The vermivorous C.amoenus, or the worm snake, shares a range with K. eatoni.

== Discovery and characterization ==
Komarekiona eatoni was discovered and rediscovered several times before it could be properly described. Around the 1930s, A. S. Pearce found the species in Duke Forest and turned it over to T.H. Eaton, Jr., then a graduate student. Eaton found the species to be different from other lumbricids. Before he could finish studying the organism, a fire destroyed his specimens. Another scientist, G. E. Pickford, still possessed a copy of Eaton's description. When Gordon Enoch Gates returned to the United States after World War II, Pickford gave the description to him. More attempts were made to collect the species again around Duke Forest, but none were found.

In 1962, as J. W. Joyner worked under a National Science Foundation grant to collect megadriles in Indiana, he found a specimen he believed to be "similar to, perhaps even the same as, the Pearce-Eaton specimens." He provided instructions for characterizing the species, but the research project was soon abandoned. Some time later, Tall Timbers Research Station and Land Conservancy began researching earthworms of the southern United States. After many attempts to rediscover the species, it was rediscovered in North Carolina. However, the worms were not mature enough to allow for characterization. Further attempts to find it in Indiana yielded no results. Meanwhile, John Warren Reynolds found adult specimens in Tennessee. He loaned the specimens to Gates, who used them with the copy of Eaton's description to characterize and name Komarekiona eatoni.

== Conservation ==
The earthworm is susceptible to disturbance and competition with non-native species. It survives in minimally disturbed second growth forests. In fact, it has been found only to occur in minimally disturbed areas.

In North Carolina, the species was considered endangered. In 2013, the species was found to be vulnerable. This is the last time it was assessed for a conservation status by the International Union for Conservation of Nature.
