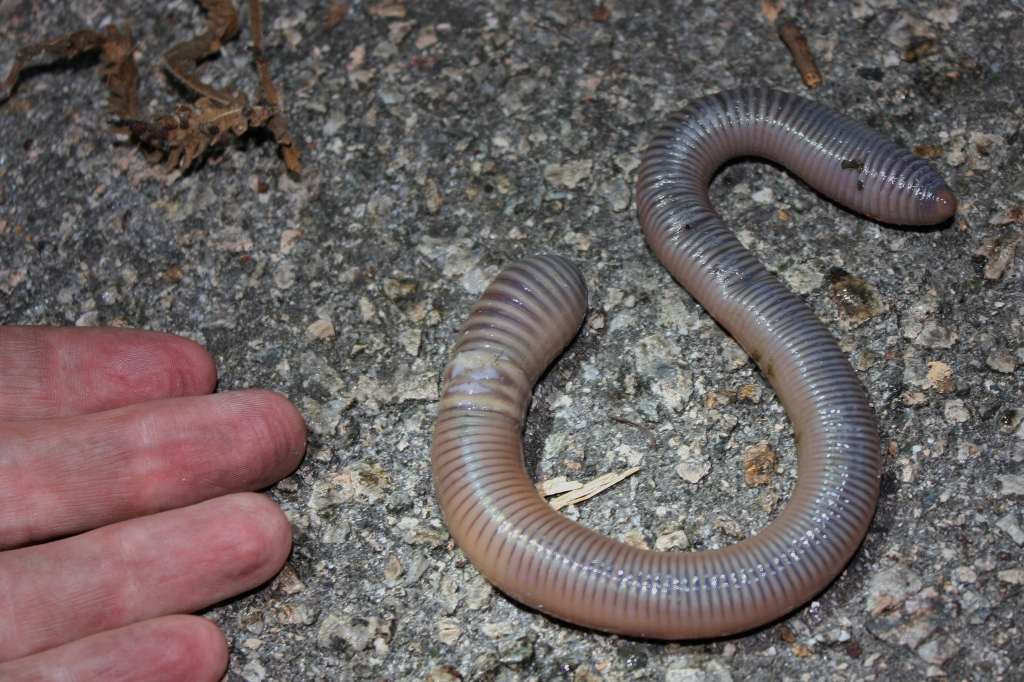
- Amynthas sp. (Megascolecidae)

Scientific classification
- Kingdom: Animalia
- Phylum: Annelida
- Clade: Pleistoannelida
- Clade: Sedentaria
- Class: Clitellata
- Subclass: Oligochaeta
- Clade: Megadrili

Families
- Acanthodrilidae; Almidae; Arecoidae; Benhamiidae; Biwadrilidae; Criodrilidae; Diporodrilidae; Eudrilidae; Glossoscolecidae; Hormogastridae; Kazimierzidae; Komarekionidae; Kynotidae; Lumbricidae; Lutodrilidae; Megascolecidae; Microchaetidae; Moniligastridae; Ocnerodrilidae; Rhinodrilidae; Sparganophilidae; Tritogeniidae; Tumakidae

= Megadrile =

Common name for a type of annelid worm

Megadriles are terrestrial annelid worms belonging to the clade Oligochaeta, including many commonly called earthworms. Megadriles are placed within the clade Megadrili or superorder Megadrilacea, and include Moniligastrida and Lumbricina (or the order Haplotaxida, following Easton). 23 families with over 5,700 species are currently known.
