= Chloragogen cell =

Chloragogen cells, also called y cells, are star-shaped cells in annelids involved with excretory functions and intermediary metabolism. These cells function similar to the liver found in vertebrates. Chloragogen tissue is most extensively studied in earthworms.

== Structure and location ==
These cells are derived from the inner coelomic epithelium and are present in the coelomic fluid of some annelids. They have characteristic vesicular bulging due to their function in storing and transporting substances, and are yellow due to the presence of cytosolic granules known as chloragosomes.

== Function ==
The most understood function of chloragogen tissue is its function in the excretory system. The cells accumulate and excrete nitrogenous wastes and silicates. They are involved in the deamination of amino acids, synthesis of urea, storage of glycogen and toxin neutralization.
