= Gordon Enoch Gates =

American zoologist

Gordon Enoch Gates (11 January 1897 – 11 June 1987) was an American zoologist. He is known for his taxonomic work on the Oligochaeta and for being a "world authority" on the subject. He published in his field for nearly 60 years.

His main focus was the morphology, physiology, taxonomy, and zoogeography of earthworms, a collection of which he donated to the National Museum of Natural History.

== Biography ==
Gates was born in Warner, New Hampshire, in 1897. He graduated from Colby College in 1919 with a Bachelor of Arts. In 1920, he was a student at Harvard Medical School where he received a Master's degree.

The same year, he married Helen Louise Baldwin. The couple had two daughters: Evelyn G. and Alice G.

=== Time in Myanmar ===
In the 1920s, Gates moved to Myanmar to do missionary work. In 1921, Gates began teaching pre-medical students at Judson College in the country. There he founded and headed the Biology department until the 1940s. While in Myanmar, he began studying earthworms.

Gates also collected ants in Yangon and sent them to Dr. William Morton Wheeler. Among more common ants were a new species of what was believed to be Aphaenogaster (but is now Pheidole gatesi) and a new variety of Aenictus binghami.

In 1942, he was forced to evacuate Myanmar due to Japanese military presence in the country. His earthworm collection and library and the majority of his manuscripts and records were destroyed during World War II.

=== Move to India ===
From 1934-1940, Gates utilized mainly borrowed material from the Zoological Survey of India and the British Museum to study earthworms in India. His studies revealed many new genera: Scolioscolides, Nellogaster, Barogaster, Lennogaster, Rillogaster, Pellogaster, Priodochaeta, Priodoscolex and Travoscolides.

After fleeing Myanmar, he and his family reunited in India. He then shifted his oligochaetological focuses to South Asia in Allahabad. He sampled species in the Indo-Gangetic Plain, central India, Dehradun, and other regions. From 1941-1945, he also wrote on Sri Lankan earthworms. His work in India led him to create a new classification of earthworms based on "stable somatic characters."

=== Return to the United States ===
He was a fellow at Museum of Comparative Zoology from 1946 to 1947, followed by being a Professor and the head of Biology at Colby College from 1948 to 1950. He resigned as head of the department in July 1951.

He then was awarded a Guggenheim Fellowship in 1952 and 1953. He was granted the fellowship in 1952 for his study of Burmese earthworms and in 1953 for studies of tropical earthworms.

From 1952 to 1962, he continued publishing on Burmese earthworms using materials rescued from the war.

=== Death ===
Gates died in Orange County, Florida on 11 June 1987.

== Associated taxonomy ==
=== Described species ===
Gates described many species of earthworms, especially in South Asia and Southeast Asia. He reportedly described 369 species in total.

- Amynthas procerus
- Komarekiona eatoni
- Metaphire arcuata
- Metaphire houlleti

=== Honorific species ===
The species Glyphidrilus gatesi is named after Gates, due to his "great contributions to taxonomy and systematics of earthworms." The species Pheidole gatesi was also named in his honor by Dr. William Morton Wheeler.

== Publications ==
- Gates, G. E. (1945). "On Some Indian Earthworms." Proceedings: Indian Academy of Sciences, 21, 208-258. DOI: 10.1007/BF03049816.
