= Nephridiopore =

Organ part in some type of worms

A nephridiopore is a pore at the end of the nephridium, an excretory organ found in invertebrates, such as flatworms and annelids. Nephridiopores open on the ventral surface of the body wall and allow metabolic wastes filtered by the nephridium to exit the body.

Nephridia are homologous to nephrons or uriniferous tubules found in the kidneys of vertebrates. They occur in two forms: metanephridia, which begin with a nephrostome, and protonephridia, which begin with a flame cell. Fluids collected by the nephrostome or flame cell pass through a ciliated tubule, where essential substances are reabsorbed through active mechanisms and waste products are secreted back into the lumen of the tube. The resulting excretory fluid or urine is then passed out through the nephridiopore.
