= Selective reabsorption =

Selective reabsorption is the process whereby certain molecules (e.g. ions, glucose and amino acids), after being filtered out of the capillaries along with nitrogenous waste products (i.e. urea) and water in the glomerulus, are reabsorbed from the filtrate as they pass through the nephron. Selective reabsorbtion occurs in the PCT (proximal convoluted tubule). The PCT is highly permeable meaning it is easy for molecules to diffuse through it.

== A basic outline of the process ==
- The co-transport sodium-potassium pump actively transports sodium out of the PCT (proximal convoluted tubule) wall (using energy from converting ATP to ADP + Pi) to maintain a low Na^{+} concentration gradient in the wall.
- This low concentration gradient means that Na^{+} ions from the glomerulus filtrate can easily passively diffuse into the wall of the PCT.
- However, the Na^{+} ions cannot diffuse freely across the membrane, but can only enter through special transporter (carrier) proteins in the membrane of the wall.
- There are several different kinds of these transporter proteins, each of which transports another molecule, such as glucose or amino acids. The concentration gradient for the sodium provides the energy to pull in these other molecules into the wall of the PCT.
- As the substances listed above (Na^{+} ions, amino acids and glucose) enter the wall of the PCT, so does 65–70% of the water in the glomerulus filtrate via osmosis. Water can move freely through the wall of the PCT (it does not require a transporter protein). Nearly all the rest of the water is reabsorbed into the blood in the loop of Henle and the collecting duct system.
- However, as urea is a small molecule it can pass easily through the membrane of the PCT wall. As the concentration of urea in the filtrate is significantly higher than in the blood, around 50% of urea on the filtrate is reabsorbed.
