= Nephridium =

Excretory organ similar to vertebrate kidney

The nephridium (pl.: nephridia) is an invertebrate organ, found in pairs and performing a function similar to the vertebrate kidneys (which originated from the chordate nephridia). Nephridia remove metabolic wastes from an animal's body and come in two basic categories: metanephridia and protonephridia. In some cases, nephridia may fuse or become functionally integrated with coelomoducts—mesodermal structures that open from the coelom to the exterior—to form a more complex structure known as a nephromixium. All animals possessing nephridia or kidneys belong to the clade Nephrozoa.

== Metanephridia ==
Earthworm nephrostome (10) and metanephridium (9).

Earthworm metanephridium

A metanephridium (meta = "after") is a type of excretory gland found in many types of invertebrates such as annelids, arthropods and mollusca. (In mollusca, it is known as the Bojanus organ.)

A metanephridium typically consists of the nephrostome (a ciliated funnel) opening into the body cavity, connected to a duct which may be variously glandularized, folded or expanded (vesiculate) and which typically opens to the organism's exterior. These ciliated tubules pump water carrying surplus ions, metabolic waste, toxins from food, and useless hormones out of the organism by directing them down funnel-shaped bodies called nephrostomes. This waste is passed out of the organism at the nephridiopore. The primary urine produced by filtration of blood (or a similarly functioning fluid) is modified into secondary urine through selective reabsorption by the cells lining the metanephridium.

=== Saccate metanephridia ===
The saccate metanephridia are excretory glands which function similarly to the metanephridia. They are found in the arthropods: coxal glands of arachnids, antennal (or green) glands and maxillary glands of crustaceans, etc.

The saccate metanephridia filter the fluid of the hemocoel, as opposed to the metanephridia which filter coelomic fluid. In a saccate metanephridium, there is a ciliated funnel covered with a membrane that helps to filter the hemocoel of heavy particles (such as proteins and carbohydrates) before the fluid even enters the funnel. Inside the funnel, the fluid is further processed through selective reabsorption, and eventually excreted from the nephridiopore.

In Crustacea, the saccate metanephridia are associated with the antennae and form the antennal gland. In freshwater crustacea, the saccate metanephridia are especially large due to their role in osmoregulation; crustacea must remove large amounts of water from the tissues, as the cells are hypertonic to the surrounding water.

== Protonephridia ==
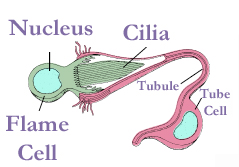
Flatworm flame cell

A protonephridium (proto = "first") is found in the phyla Platyhelminthes, Nemertea, Rotifera and Chordata (lancelets). They have the same anatomy as the metanephridia but with the internal ciliated funnel blocked by terminal cells: either a flame cell (if ciliated) or a solenocyte (if flagellated). Thus their tubules lack internal openings, while retaining their opening to the organism's exterior. They function in osmoregulation (ionoregulation).

Each terminal cell has one or more cilia and their beating inside the protonephridial tube creates an outward going current and hence a partial pressurization in the blind of the tube. Because of this, pressurization drives waste fluids from the inside of the animal, and they are pulled through small perforations in the terminal cells and into the protonephridium. The perforations in the terminal cell are large enough for small molecules to pass, but larger proteins are retained within the animal. From the bottom of the protonephridium the solutes are led through the tube, formed by the canal cells, and exits the animal from a small opening formed by the nephridiopore.

Selective reabsorption of useful molecules by the canal cells occurs as the solutes pass down the tubule. Protonephridia are generally found in basal organisms such as flatworms. Protonephridia likely first arose as a way to cope with a hypotonic environment by removing excess water from the organism (osmoregulation). Their use as excretory and ionoregulatory structures likely arose secondarily.

This excretory system in phylum Platyhelminthes is also called blind tubules. These tubules bear a tuft of cilia or a flagellum. The mechanism of excretion involves the cilia or a flagellum within the hollow, cup-shaped cells oscillating, drawing in waste products, and wafting them through a connecting tubule to the external environment.

Furthermore, protonephridia are model systems and specimens to analyze human diseases.
