= Noke (worms) =

Māori term for earthworms

- Type: Earthworm delicacy reserved for chiefs
- Place of origin: New Zealand
- Variations: Worm sushi and chocolate truffles with crystallized worm

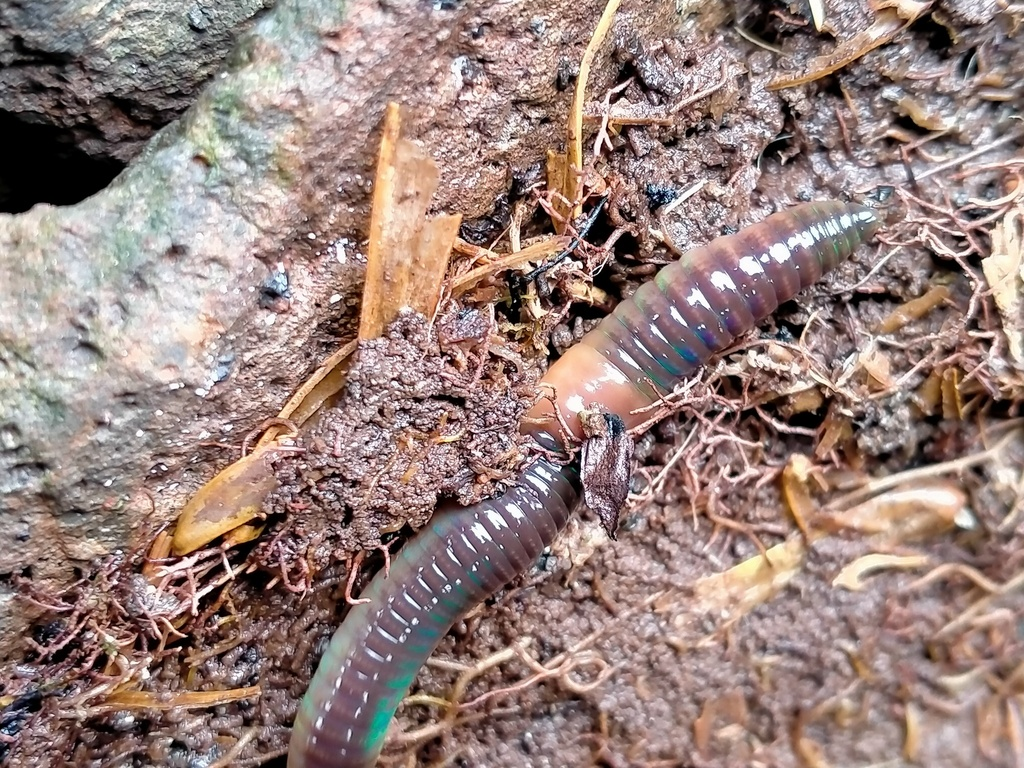
Noke from Auckland Island

Noke is a culinary term used by the Māori of New Zealand to refer to earthworms. Some types of native worms (called noke whiti and noke kurekure in Māori) are historically local delicacies reserved for chiefs because of their sweet flavour, which was said to "remain in the mouth for two days". Another notable kind of worm, the noke waiū (possibly Octochaetus multiporus), was prized as eel fishing bait due to its large size and bioluminescence. Noke has more recently become a popular trend at certain New Zealand wild food festivals, where it is often served in modern fusion dishes such as worm sushi and chocolate truffles with crystallized worm.

According to Māori mythology, the trickster Māui once transformed himself into a noke worm in order to crawl into the womb of the underworld goddess Hine-nui-te-pō and gain everlasting life. Due to its having characteristics of both males and females, it was considered divine.

== Sources ==
Martin, Daniella. Edible: An Adventure into the World of Eating Insects and the Last Great Hope to Save the Planet 2014
