= Drilosphere =

Layer of the soil influenced by earthworms

The drilosphere is the part of the soil influenced by earthworm secretions, burrowing and castings. Therefore, it is the fraction of soil which has gone through the digestive tract of earthworms, or the lining of an earthworm burrow. The average thickness of the drilosphere (lining of an earthworm burrow) is 2 mm, but it can be much wider (about 8 mm) around the burrows of litter-feeding earthworms.

Through the drilosphere, earthworms influence soil microbial communities, with effects on microbial processes related to soil organic matter and nutrient dynamics. A study of one soil type found that contained within the drilosphere was 40 per cent of the aerobic (and 13 per cent of anaerobic) nitrogen-fixing bacteria and 16 per cent of the denitrifiers. The drilosphere is generally richer in nitrogen, phosphorus, and humified organic material than the surrounding soil. This is probably because earthworms preferentially ingest plant residue such as leaf and root litter, or occasionally fungi.

The term was coined by M. B. Bouché.
