= Organic pollution =

Organic pollution may refer to:

- concentration of organic compounds in water including:
  - dissolved and suspended biogenic substances from aquatic and terrestrial species
  - persistent organic pollutants
  - nutrients from fertilizers or other sources of soluble nitrogen or phosphorus
- air pollution through volatile organic compounds
