= Nephrostome =

A diagram of the inner organs of an annelid worm showing the metanephridia and both nephrostomes in one of the animal's segments

The nephrostome is the funnel-like component of a metanephridium. It is always oriented towards the coelom. The nephrostome is covered from the inside with cilia, which push the water, metabolic wastes, unnecessary hormones and other substances into the metanephridium.
