= Typhlosole =

Internal fold of the intestine found in certain animals

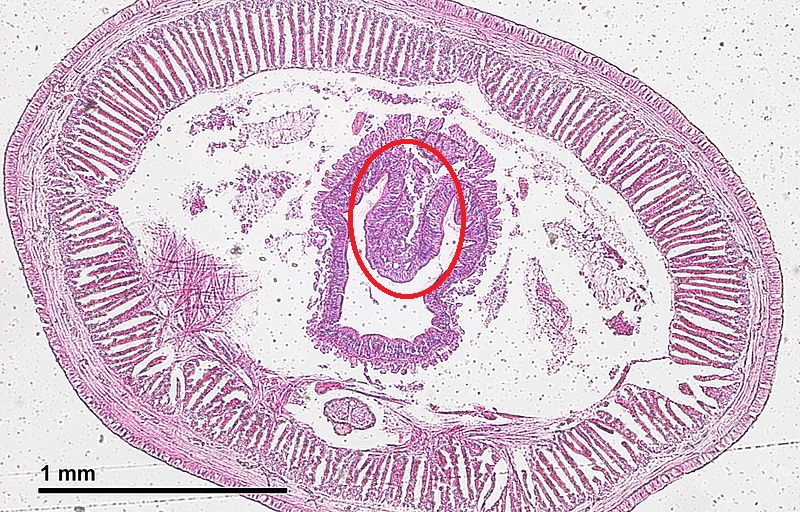

In biological morphology, a typhlosole is an internal fold of the intestine or intestine inner wall. Typhlosoles occur in bivalve mollusks, lampreys and some annelids and echinoderms.

In earthworms, it is a dorsal flap of the intestine that runs along most of its length, effectively forming a tube within a tube, and increasing the absorption area by that of its inner surface. Its function is to increase intestine surface area for more efficient absorption of digested nutrients. The earthworm typhlosole is surrounded by chloragogen cells, which serve as an equivalent to the vertebrate liver by synthesizing and storing fat and glycogen, deamination of proteins, and excretion. In different earthworm families, the typhlosole appears to have multiple origins. The Lumbricidae, for example, have a typhlosole which is an infolding of all layers of the intestine wall, whereas in some other families (e.g. Megascolecidae), it is an infolding of only the inner layer, and in many earthworms it is absent.

In shipworms, the typhlosole is the organ where the lignin in wood are digested by symbiont bacteria of the "Alteromonas-like sub-group".

== See also ==
- body cavity (coelom)
