= Temptin =

Temptin is a protein that acts as a water-borne pheromone in the marine gastropod mollusk Aplysia californica. It is an abundant protein that is synthesized in the albumen gland, and is released in the egg cords during oviposition, along with other proteins called attractin, seductin and enticin. Together, they make up a complex of water-soluble proteins that act together to attract mates for reproduction and induce spawning.

== History ==
Temptin was first described in 2004 in the marine gastropod Aplysia californica. In 2017, the knowledge of temptin as a chemical signal was extended to the freshwater gastropod mollusk Biomphalaria glabrata. In 2019 it was reported as a protein present in the aerial eggs of the freshwater gastropod molluscs Pomacea canaliculata and Pomacea maculata. In 2021 a study of the temptin gene suggests that it is unique to all Lophotrochozoa, and that it is present in all molluscs, except in cephalopods.

== Structure ==
The gene encoding temptin is found the Lophotrochozoa clade. Temptin from Aplysia californica has sequence homology to epidermal growth factor (EGF)-like domains of higher organisms that mediate protein surface contact with cells during fertilization and blood coagulation. The protein has two disulfide bound, that could stabilize it from proteolysis in the extracellular medium where it is released, and a possible calcium binding site.

== Function ==
In addition to its pheromone function, in the freshwater bivalve Hyriopsis cumingii, the protein is expressed in the mantle and it is involved in the biomineralization process. Through gene silencing it was shown that their absence alters the biomineral structure of the mollusc shell.
