= Microdrile =

Common name for a type of annelid worm

Microdriles (small worms) are mostly aquatic or semi-terrestrial oligochaetes.
