= Lutodrilus =

Conservation status
- Near Threatened (IUCN 2.3)

Scientific classification
- Kingdom: Animalia
- Phylum: Annelida
- Clade: Pleistoannelida
- Clade: Sedentaria
- Class: Clitellata
- Order: Opisthopora
- Suborder: Lumbricina
- Family: Lutodrilidae; McMahan, 1976
- Genus: Lutodrilus; McMahan, 1976
- Species: L. multivesiculatus

Binomial name
- Lutodrilus multivesiculatus McMahan, 1976

Genus of annelid worms

Lutodrilus is a genus of annelid worms in the Lutodrilidae family. The genus has a single species, Lutodrilus multivesiculatus.

== Distribution ==
It is endemic to the United States.
