= Chemical signalling =

Chemical signalling may refer to:

- Chemical signalling between cells, or cell signalling
- Chemical signalling between plants, or plant communication
- Chemical signalling between animals, or olfactory communication
