= Tumakidae =

Scientific classification
- Domain: Eukaryota
- Kingdom: Animalia
- Phylum: Annelida
- Clade: Pleistoannelida
- Clade: Sedentaria
- Class: Clitellata
- Order: Opisthopora
- Suborder: Crassiclitellata
- Family: Tumakidae

Family of annelids

Tumakidae is a family of annelids belonging to the order Crassiclitellata.

Genera:

- Tumak Righi, 1995
