= Sparganophilus =

Scientific classification
- Domain: Eukaryota
- Kingdom: Animalia
- Phylum: Annelida
- Clade: Pleistoannelida
- Clade: Sedentaria
- Class: Clitellata
- Order: Haplotaxida
- Family: Sparganophilidae
- Genus: Sparganophilus

Genus of annelids

Sparganophilus, the only genus in the family Sparganophilidae, is a group of long, slender, limicolous (mud-dwelling) earthworms native to North America. The number of species is unknown, most of them are undescribed, throughout the continent and into Central America. One species, S. tamesis, has been introduced into the streams of Europe, where it is now widespread; its synonyms are S. eiseni, S. benhami, S. guatemalensis, S. carnea, S. elongatus, S. cuenoti and, newly, S. langi.

Sparganophilus species are characterised by a simple gut with no gizzard and no typhlosole. They are true earthworms, having a complex vascular system with capillaries and having the male pores far behind the female pores. They were at one time placed in the earthworm family Glossoscolecidae, but at present are considered to constitute their own family.

Sparganophilus species are commonly found in mud next to rivers and streams. They feed in the low oxygen mud and organic material, but with their highly vascularized posterior region on or near the surface.

Sparganophilus has no accepted common name.
