= Metabolic waste =

Surplus or toxic substances left over from metabolic processes that must be excreted

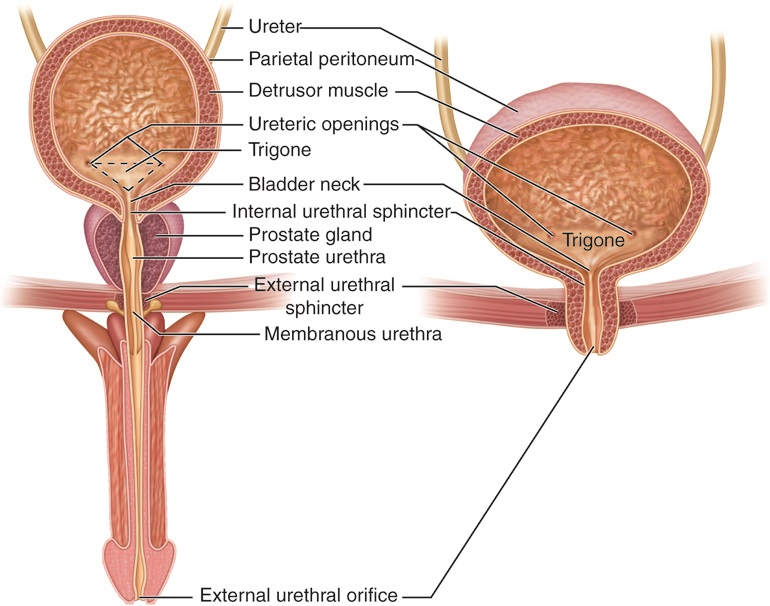
Placental mammals expel urine from the bladder through the urethra during urination.

Metabolic wastes or excrements are substances left over from metabolic processes (such as cellular respiration) which cannot be used by the organism (they are surplus or toxic), and must therefore be excreted. This includes nitrogen compounds, water, CO_{2}, phosphates, sulphates, etc. Animals treat these compounds as excretes. Plants have metabolic pathways which transform some of them (primarily the oxygen compounds) into useful substances, while others are stored, released into the environment, or broken down through further biochemical processes.

All the metabolic wastes are excreted in a form of water solutes through the excretory organs (nephridia, Malpighian tubules, kidneys), with the exception of CO_{2}, which is excreted together with the water vapor throughout the lungs. The elimination of these compounds enables the chemical homeostasis of the organism.

== Nitrogen wastes ==
The nitrogen compounds through which excess nitrogen is eliminated from organisms are called nitrogenous wastes (/naɪˈtrɒdʒɪnəs/) or nitrogen wastes. They are ammonia, urea, uric acid, and creatinine. All of these substances are produced from protein metabolism. In many animals, the urine is the main route of excretion for such wastes; in some, it is the feces.

=== Ammonotelism ===
Ammonotelism is the excretion of ammonia and ammonium ions. Ammonia (NH_{3}) forms with the oxidation of amino groups.(-NH_{2}), which are removed from the proteins when they convert into carbohydrates. It is a very toxic substance to tissues and extremely soluble in water. Only one nitrogen atom is removed with it. A lot of water is needed for the excretion of ammonia, about 0.5 L of water is needed per 1 g of nitrogen to maintain ammonia levels in the excretory fluid below the level in body fluids to prevent toxicity. Thus, the marine organisms excrete ammonia directly into the water and are called ammonotelic. Ammonotelic animals include most fish as well as crustaceans, platyhelminths, cnidarians, poriferans, echinoderms and other aquatic invertebrates.

=== Ureotelism ===
The excretion of urea is called ureotelism. Land animals, mainly amphibians and mammals, convert ammonia into urea, a process which occurs in the liver and kidney. These animals are called ureotelic. Urea is a less toxic compound than ammonia; two nitrogen atoms are eliminated through it and less water is needed for its excretion. It requires 0.05 L of water to excrete 1 g of nitrogen, approximately only 10% of that required in ammonotelic organisms.

=== Uricotelism ===
Uricotelism is the excretion of excess nitrogen in the form of uric acid. Uricotelic animals include insects, birds and most reptiles. Though requiring more metabolic energy to make than urea, uric acid's low toxicity and low solubility in water allow it to be concentrated into a small volume of pasty white suspension in feces, compared to the liquid urine of mammals. Notably however, great apes and humans, while ureotelic, are also uricotelic to a small extent, with uric acid potentially causing problems such as kidney stones and gout, but also functioning as a blood antioxidant.

== Water and gases ==
These compounds form during the catabolism of carbohydrates and lipids in condensation reactions, and in some other metabolic reactions of the amino acids. Oxygen is produced by plants and some bacteria in photosynthesis, while CO_{2} is a waste product of all animals and plants. Nitrogen gases are produced by denitrifying bacteria and as a waste product, and bacteria for decaying yield ammonia, as do most invertebrates and vertebrates. Water is the only liquid waste from animals and photosynthesizing plants.

== Solids ==
Nitrates and nitrites are wastes produced by nitrifying bacteria, just as sulfur and sulfates are produced by the sulfur-reducing bacteria and sulfate-reducing bacteria. Insoluble iron waste can be made by iron bacteria by using soluble forms. In plants, resins, fats, waxes, and complex organic chemicals are exuded from plants, e.g., the latex from rubber trees and milkweeds. Solid waste products may be manufactured as organic pigments derived from breakdown of pigments like hemoglobin, and inorganic salts like carbonates, bicarbonates, and phosphate, whether in ionic or in molecular form, are excreted as solids.

Animals dispose of solid waste as feces.

== See also ==
- Ammonia poisoning
- Deamination
