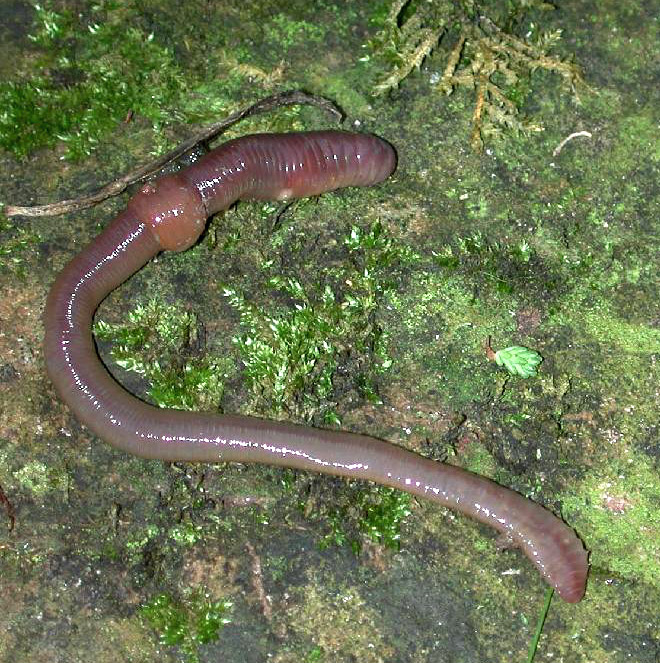
- Earthworm (Lumbricus terrestris)

Scientific classification
- Kingdom: Animalia
- Phylum: Annelida
- Clade: Pleistoannelida
- Clade: Sedentaria
- Class: Clitellata
- Subclass: Oligochaeta

Orders
- Haplotaxida; Lumbriculida; Moniligastrida

= Oligochaeta =

Oligochaeta Temporal range: Permian (Lopingian) – recent

Subclass of annelids including earthworms

Oligochaeta (Note: /ˌɒlɪɡəˈkiːtə, -ɡoʊ-/) is a subclass of soft-bodied animals in the phylum Annelida, which is made up of many types of aquatic and terrestrial worms, including all of the various earthworms. Specifically, oligochaetes (Note: Also spelled oligochetes) (Note: Pronounced /ˈɒləɡoʊkiːts/ OL-ə-goh-keets, /-ɡə-/; also /əˈlɪɡoʊkiːts/ ə-LIH-goh-keets, /-ɡə-/) comprise the terrestrial megadrile earthworms (some of which are semiaquatic or fully aquatic), and freshwater or semiterrestrial microdrile forms, including the tubificids, pot worms and ice worms (Enchytraeidae), blackworms (Lumbriculidae) and several interstitial marine worms.

With around 10,000 known species, the Oligochaeta make up about half of the phylum Annelida. These worms usually have few setae (chaetae) or "bristles" on their outer body surfaces, and lack parapodia, unlike polychaeta.

== Diversity ==
Oligochaetes are well-segmented worms and most have a spacious body cavity (coelom) used as a hydroskeleton. They range in length from less than 0.5 mm (0.02 in) up to 2 to 3 metres (6.6 to 9.8 ft) in the 'giant' species such as the giant Gippsland earthworm (Megascolides australis) and the Mekong worm (Amynthas mekongianus).

Terrestrial oligochaetes are commonly known as earthworms and burrow into the soil. The four main families with large numbers of species are Glossoscolecidae, Lumbricidae, Megascolecidae and Moniligastridae. Earthworms are found in all parts of the world except for deserts. They have a requirement for moist surroundings and the larger species create burrows that may go down several metres (yards) while young individuals and smaller species are restricted to the top few centimetres of soil. The largest numbers are found in humus-rich soils and acid soils. A few species are found in trees, among damp moss and in the debris that accumulates in leaf axils and crevices; some others make their homes in the rosettes of bromeliads.

The majority of aquatic oligochaetes are small, slender worms, whose organs can be seen through the transparent body wall. They burrow into the sediment or live among the vegetation mostly in shallow, freshwater environments. Some are transitional between terrestrial and aquatic habitats, inhabiting swamps, mud or the borders of water bodies. About two hundred species are marine, mostly in the families Enchytraeidae and Naididae; these are found largely in the tidal and shallow subtidal zones, but a few are found at abyssal depths.

== Anatomy ==
The first segment, or prostomium, of oligochaetes is usually a smooth lobe or cone without sensory organs, although it is sometimes extended to form a tentacle. The remaining segments have no appendages, but they do have a small number of bristles, or chaetae. These tend to be longer in aquatic forms than in the burrowing earthworms, and can have a variety of shapes.

Each segment has four bundles of chaetae, with two on the underside, and the others on the sides. The bundles can contain one to 25 chaetae, and include muscles to pull them in and out of the body. This enables the worm to gain a grip on the soil or mud as it burrows into the substrate. When burrowing, the body moves peristaltically, alternately contracting and stretching to push itself forward.

A number of segments in the forward part of the body are modified by the presence of numerous secretory glands. Together, they form the clitellum, which is important in reproduction.

=== Internal anatomy ===
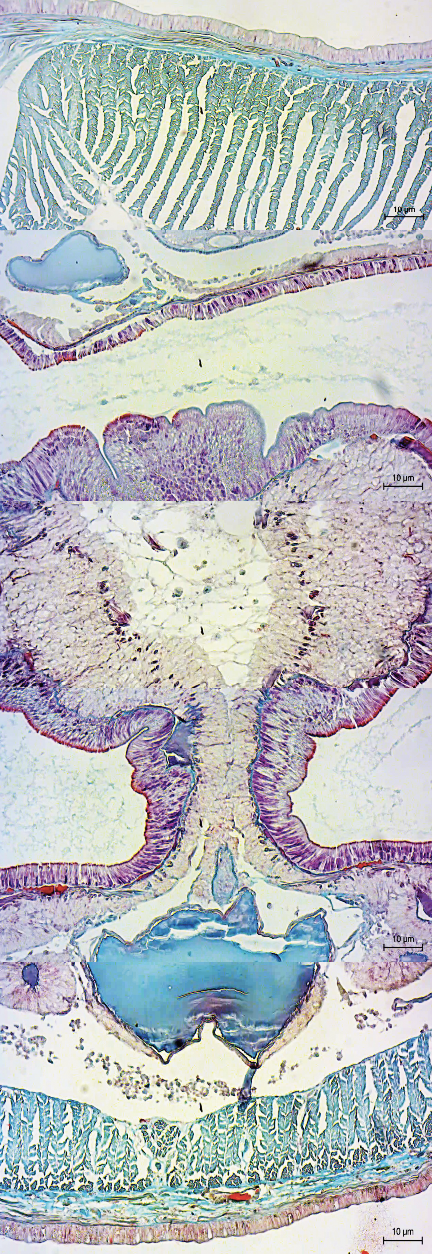
Earthworm cross section. Visible structures include the cuticle, longitudinal muscle layer, intestine, and coelom.

Most oligochaetes are detritivores, although some genera are predaceous, such as Agriodrilus and Phagodrilus. The digestive tract is essentially a tube running the length of the body, but has a powerful muscular pharynx immediately behind the mouth cavity. In many species, the pharynx simply helps the worm suck in food, but in many aquatic species, it can be turned inside out and placed over food like a suction cup before being retracted.

The remainder of the digestive tract may include a crop for storage of food, and a gizzard for grinding it up, although these are not present in all species. The oesophagus includes 'calciferous glands' that maintain calcium balance by excreting indigestible calcium carbonate into the gut. A number of yellowish chloragogen cells surround the intestine and the dorsal blood vessel, forming a tissue that functions in a similar fashion to the vertebrate liver. Some of these cells also float freely in the body cavity, where they are referred to as 'eleocytes'.

Most oligochaetes have no gills or similar structures, and simply breathe through their moist skin. The few exceptions generally have simple, filamentous gills. Excretion is through small ducts known as metanephridia. Terrestrial oligochaetes secrete urea, but the aquatic forms typically secrete ammonia, which dissolves rapidly into the water.

The vascular system consists of two main vessels connected by lateral vessels in each segment. Blood is carried forward in the dorsal vessel (in the upper part of the body) and back through the ventral vessel (underneath), before passing into a sinus surrounding the intestine. Some of the smaller vessels are muscular, effectively forming hearts; from one to five pairs of such hearts is typical. The blood of oligochaetes contains haemoglobin in all but the smallest of species, which have no need of respiratory pigments.

The nervous system consists of two ventral nerve cords, which are usually fused into a single structure, and three or four pairs of smaller nerves per body segment. Only a few aquatic oligochaetes have eyes, and even then they are only simply ocelli. Nonetheless, their skin has several individual photoreceptors, allowing the worm to sense the presence of light, and burrow away from it. Oligochaetes can taste their surroundings using chemoreceptors located in tubercles across their body, and their skin is also supplied with numerous free nerve endings that presumably contribute to their sense of touch.

== Distribution and habitat ==
Oligochaetes occur in every continent in the world occupying terrestrial, freshwater and marine habitats. Of the 1700 known aquatic species, about 600 are marine and 100 inhabit groundwater. Aquatic oligochaetes occur in most groups, with the Naididae being the most speciose.

== Locomotion ==
Movement and burrowing of earthworms is performed by peristalsis, with the alternation of contraction and relaxation of the circular and longitudinal muscles. To move forward, the anterior portion of the worm is extended forward by the contraction of the circular muscles, while the portion just behind this is made shorter and fatter by the contraction of longitudinal muscles. Next the anterior circular muscles relax, and a wave of circular contraction moves posteriorly along the worm. At the same time, the chaetae expand to grip the ground as the body shortens and are retracted as it lengthens. The steps are typically 2 to 3 cm (0.8 to 1.2 in) long and the worm moves at the rate of seven to ten steps per minute. The worm is able to reverse its direction of travel with the posterior leading. Aquatic species use a similar means of locomotion to work their way through sediment and masses of vegetation, but the tiny Aeolosomatids instead swim by means of the cilia on their prostomia.

Burrowing is performed by forcing the anterior of the worm into a crevice and widening the gap by body expansion. Large quantities of soil are swallowed in the process. This is mixed with mucus as it passes through the gut, being used to plaster the tunnel walls, forming a lining. Excess material is extruded on the ground surface, forming a faecal casting. The burrow may have two entrances and several shafts and tunnels.

== Reproduction ==
Whereas in general, polychaetes are marine and have separate sexes, external sperm transfer and external fertilisation, oligochaetes live on land or in fresh water, are hermaphrodites, have no external sperm transfer and fertilisation takes place in the clitellum or cocoon. However there are exceptions to this, with some polychaetes inhabiting non-marine environments and a few species of oligochaetes being marine. Development of the offspring also differs between the two subclasses. The eggs of polychaetes are deposited in the sea where they develop into trochophore larvae that disperse as part of the plankton, while the yolky eggs of oligochaetes do not have a larval stage and develop directly into juvenile worms in the cocoon.

Reproduction among oligochaetes is mainly by sexual means but clonal reproduction is common in some genera, especially among aquatic species. Members of the Naididae reproduce asexually, primarily by paratomy, in which the body breaks into two pieces after the "pregeneration" of certain anterior structures by the posterior portion. Other species undergo fragmentation, in which the worm breaks into several pieces, each of which develops into a new worm. Parthenogenesis also occurs in some species.

== Evolution and taxonomy ==
With their soft bodies, earthworms do not fossilize well, though they may form trace fossils. The name Protoscolex was given to a genus of segmented worms without bristles found in the Upper Ordovician of Kentucky, United States. Another species placed in the same genus was found in Herefordshire, England, but it is unclear whether these worms are in fact oligochaetes. Stephenson postulated in 1930 that the common ancestor of oligochaetes came from the primitive aquatic family Lumbriculidae. The more advanced families such as Glossoscolecidae, Hormogastridae, Lumbricidae and Microchaetidae may have evolved later than the other families. Because of their ability to colonise new areas and become dominant, the Lumbricidae have followed humans round the world and displaced many native species of earthworm.

An early but now outdated classification system was to divide the oligochaetes into "Megadrili", the larger terrestrial species, and "Microdili", the smaller, mostly aquatic ones.

=== Families ===
- Acanthodrilidae Claus, 1880 (including Diplocardiinae Michaelsen, 1900)
- Ailoscolecidae Bouché, 1969 (including Komarekionidae Gates, 1974)
- Alluroididae Michaelsen, 1900
- Almidae Duboscq, 1902
- Criodrilidae Vejdovsky, 1884 (including Biwadrilidae Brinkhurst & Jamieson, 1971)
- Dorydrilidae Cook, 1971
- Enchytraeidae Vejdovsky, 1879
- Eudrilidae Claus, 1880
- Exxidae Blakemore, 2000
- Glossoscolecidae Michaelsen, 1900
- Haplotaxidae Michaelsen, 1900
- Hormogastridae Michaelsen, 1900 (including Vignysinae Bouché, 1970 and Xaninae Diaz Cosin et al., 1989)
- Kynotidae Brinkhurst & Jamieson, 1971
- Lumbricidae Claus, 1876 (including Diporodrilinae Bouché, 1970; Eiseniinae Omodeo, 1956; Spermophorodrilinae Omodeo & Rota, 1989; Postandrilinae Qiu & Bouché, 1998; Allolobophorinae Kvavadze, 2000 and Helodrilinae Kvavadze, 2000)
- Lumbriculidae Vejdovsky, 1884
- Lutodrilidae McMahan, 1976
- Megascolecidae Rosa, 1891 (including Pontodrilinae Vejdovsky, 1884; Plutellinae Vejdovsky, 1884 and Argilophilinae Fender & McKey-Fender, 1990)
- Microchaetidae Michaelsen, 1900
- Moniligastridae Claus, 1880
- Naididae / Tubificidae Vejdovsky, 1884 (including Naidinae Ehrenberg, 1831)
- Narapidae Righi, 1983
- Ocnerodrilidae Beddard, 1891 (including Malabariinae Gates, 1966)
- Octochaetidae Michaelsen, 1900 (including Benhamiinae Michaelsen, 1895/7)
- Opistocystidae Cernosvitov, 1936
- Parvidrilidae Erséus, 1999
- Phreodrilidae Beddard, 1891
- Propappidae Coates, 1986
- Randiellidae Erséus & Strehlow, 1986
- Sparganophilidae Michaelsen, 1918
- Syngenodrilidae Smith & Green, 1919
- Tiguassuidae Brinkhurst, 1988
- Tritogeniidae Plisko, 2013
- Tumakidae Righi, 1995

== Bibliography ==
- Blakemore, R. J. (2005). Whither Octochaetidae? – its family status reviewed. In: Advances in Earthworm Taxonomy II. Eds. A. A. & V. V. Pop. Proceedings IOTM2, Cluj University Press. Romania. Pp. 63–84. http://www.annelida.net/earthworm/Octochaetidae5.pdf ; https://web.archive.org/web/20220120182537/http://www.annelida.net/earthworm/Octochaetidae5.pdf.
- Blakemore, R. J. (2006). Revised Key to Earthworm Families (Ch. 9). In: A Series of Searchable Texts on Earthworm Biodiversity, Ecology and Systematics from Various Regions of the World – 2nd Edition (2006). Eds.: N. Kaneko & M. T. Ito. COE Soil Ecology Research Group, Yokohama National University, Japan. CD-ROM Publication. Website: https://web.archive.org/web/20080105055856/http://bio-eco.eis.ynu.ac.jp/eng/database/earthworm/.
- Erséus, C.; Källersjö, M. (2003). "18S rDNA phylogeny of basal groups of Clitellata (Annelida)". Zoologica Scripta. 33 (2): 187–196. doi:10.1111/j.1463-6409.2004.00146.x.
- Michaelsen, W. (1900). Das Tierreich 10: Vermes, Oligochaeta. Friedländer & Sohn, Berlin. Pp. xxix+575, figs. 1-13. Online here: http://mail2web.com/cgi-bin/redir.asp?lid=0&newsite=https://archive.org/details/oligochaeta10mich.
- Plisko, J.D. (2013). A new family Tritogeniidae for the genera Tritogenia and Michalakus, earlier accredited to the composite Microchaetidae (Annelida: Oligochaeta). African Invertebrates 54 (1): 69–92.
- Siddall, M. E., Apakupakul, K, Burreson, E. M., Coates, K. A., Erséus, C, Gelder, S. R., Källersjö, M, & Trapido-Rosenthal, H. (2001). Validating Livanow's Hypothesis: Molecular Data Agree that Leeches, Branchiobdellidans and Acanthobdella peledina form a Monophyletic Group of Oligochaetes. Molecular Phylogenetics and Evolution, 21: 346–351. http://research.amnh.org/~siddall/pub/livanow.pdf.
- Stephenson, J. (1930). The Oligochaeta. Clarendon Press, Oxford. Pp. 978.
