= List of freshwater leeches of Great Britain =

This is a list of freshwater leeches recorded in Great Britain. There are 21 confirmed species. Another species, morphologically similar to Cambarincola okadai, but genetically distinct, was found in south Wales in 2013 (see below).

== Arhynchobdellida ==
=== Family Erpobdellidae ===
- Dina lineata (O. F. Müller, 1773)

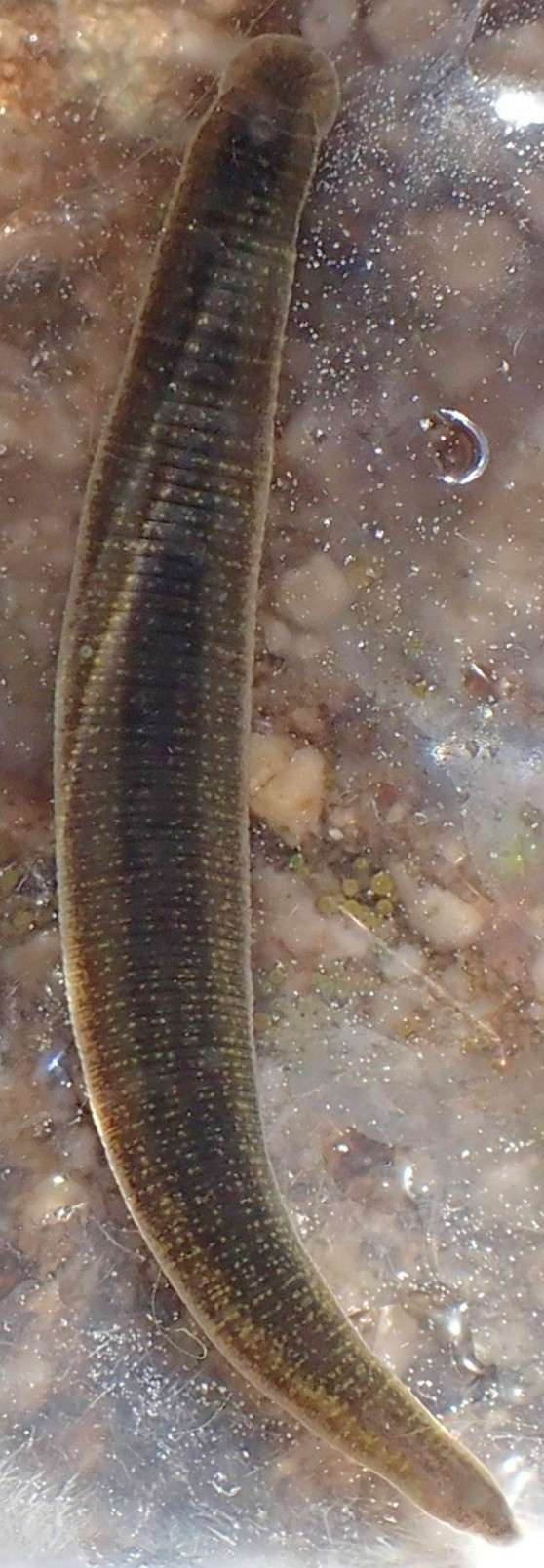
Specimen of Dina lineata found in Italy.

- Erpobdella octoculata (Linnaeus, 1758)
- Erpobdella testacea (Savigny, 1822)
- Trocheta bykowskii Gedroyc, 1913
- Trocheta subviridis Dutrochet, 1817

=== Family Hirudinidae ===
- Haemopis sanguisuga (Linnaeus, 1758)
- Hirudo medicinalis Linnaeus, 1758

=== Family Salifidae ===
- Barbronia weberi (Blanchard, 1897) — first described from Indonesia, its native range encompasses south-east Asia, including Afghanistan, Pakistan, Java, Sumatra, Celebes, Philippines, Borneo and Southern China. This species has been introduced to North and South America, Australia, New Zealand, Seychelles and Europe. In Europe, it has been recorded from Austria, Germany, Hungary, Italy, Spain, and potentially the Netherlands. It lives in running waters as well as ponds and lakes, often using aquatic vegetation as a substrate, but also stones and woody debris. It feeds on oligochaetes, insect larvae and small molluscs, swallowing the entire prey. It is a highly invasive species due to its rapid development, ability to develop cocoons without cross-fertilisation, tolerance of a wide range of environmental conditions and its association with plants used in the aquarium trade. In Britain, it was first recorded in 2025 from Cody Dock, on the tidal reaches of the River Lea.

== Branchiobdellida ==
Branchiobdellida is an order of freshwater leech-like clitellates that are obligate ectosymbionts or ectoparasites, mostly of astacoidean crayfish.

=== Family Branchiobdellidae ===
- Branchiobdella astaci Odier, 1823 - First recorded in Britain on the gills of native white clawed crayfish (Austropotamobius pallipes) in a small stream near Burghfield Bridge, Reading. This species feeds on unicellular algae and diatoms, that are carried to the worm by the respiratory current of the crayfish.
- Cambarincola sp. - Recorded on Signal crayfish (Pacifastacus leniusculus) at a single location in the Gavenny River, Abergavenny, south Wales. Molecular studies found the closest match (91%) to Cambarincola okadai, however, the specimens also exhibited some morphological similarities with Cambarincola macrocephalus, therefore, further research is needed.
- Xironogiton victoriensis (Gelder and Hall, 1990) - Recorded on Signal crayfish (Pacifastacus leniusculus) at a single location in the Gavenny River, Abergavenny, south Wales.

== Rhynchobdellida ==
Rhynchobdellida is an order of "jawless" leeches with a pharynx which they evert to attack their hosts.

=== Family Glossiphoniidae ===
- Alboglossiphonia heteroclita (Linnaeus, 1761) — a Palaearctic and Nearctic species. It feeds on body fluids of gastropod molluscs, often staying in the mantle cavity for considerable periods in winter. It also feeds chiefly on oligochaetes, chironomids, lightly on Asellus and caddisfly larvae, and scarcely on amphipods and cladocerans. Unlike other species in the family that deposit their eggs on the substratum, parents of A. heteroclita carry the eggs on the ventral surface. This species occurs in lakes, ponds and marginal vegetation of slow-flowing rivers and streams.
- Batracobdella algira (Moquin-Tandon, 1846) — a European species first discovered in the British Isles from southern England in 2024. It parasitizes amphibians, and was observed infesting Bufo bufo and Rana temporaria. Molecular analysis of the leeches collected connected the leeches to Tunisian populations, and the discoverers concluded that the leeches were probably not native to the region. In general, B. algira prefers warmer habitats and is found in the southern Palearctic realm.
- Batracobdella paludosa (Carena, 1824) — a rare species in the UK, and the thirteenth-most collected in the 1982 report. It was first described from Britain in 1953. The species is "widespread but rare", and parasitizes gastropods in ponds, lakes, streams, and rivers. It is found in the Palearctic realm.

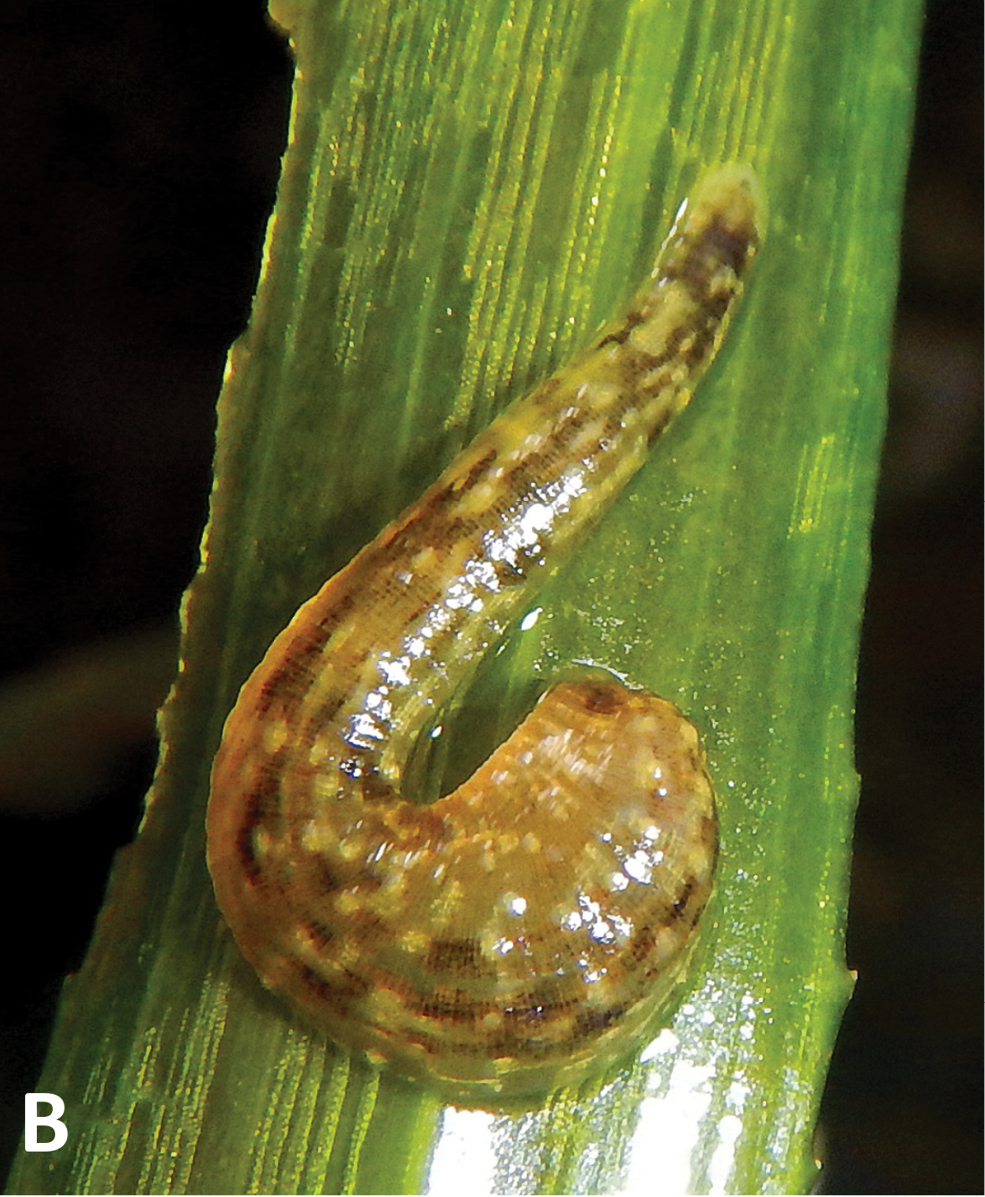
Glossiphonia verrucata in Germany.

- Glossiphonia complanata (Linnaeus, 1758) — also known as the greater snail leech, this is a very common species in the UK – in fact, the 1982 report found it was the most-recorded species of freshwater leech in the British Isles.
- Glossiphonia verrucata (Müller, 1844)
- Helobdella stagnalis (Linnaeus, 1758)
- Hemiclepsis marginata (O. F. Müller, 1773)
- Placobdella costata (Müller, 1846)
- Theromyzon tessulatum (O. F. Müller, 1774)

=== Family Piscicolidae ===
- Piscicola geometra (Linnaeus, 1761) — a common species that is best known for parasitizing freshwater fishes, although they also sometimes attack amphibians, molluscs, and other worms. The species is native to the Palearctic realm, but were introduced to the Nearctic, and have been reported from South America as well. The leeches are not permanent parasites and are free-living during their breeding period, and live in fish ponds, lake shores, and watercourses with a strong current. In the British Isles, they are common in England, southern Ireland, and Wales, but rare in northern Ireland and Scotland. A 1982 recording scheme showed it to be the sixth-most collected species of freshwater leech in the British Isles.
- Piscicola siddalli Bielecki, Cios, Cichocka & Pakulnicka, 2012 — the smallest species of British freshwater leech, sometimes measuring just 7 millimetres (280 mils) at rest. It was discovered for the first time in 2006 living in the River Ure, where it was parasitizing grayling. The discovery was not published until 2012.
