= Ailoscolex =

Scientific classification
- Kingdom: Animalia
- Phylum: Annelida
- Clade: Pleistoannelida
- Clade: Sedentaria
- Class: Clitellata
- Order: Haplotaxida
- Family: Hormogastridae
- Genus: Ailoscolex; Bouché, 1969

Genus of annelid worms

Ailoscolex is a genus of annelids belonging to the family Hormogastridae.

The species of this genus are found in Europe.

Species:

- Ailoscolex lacteospumosus Bouché, 1969
