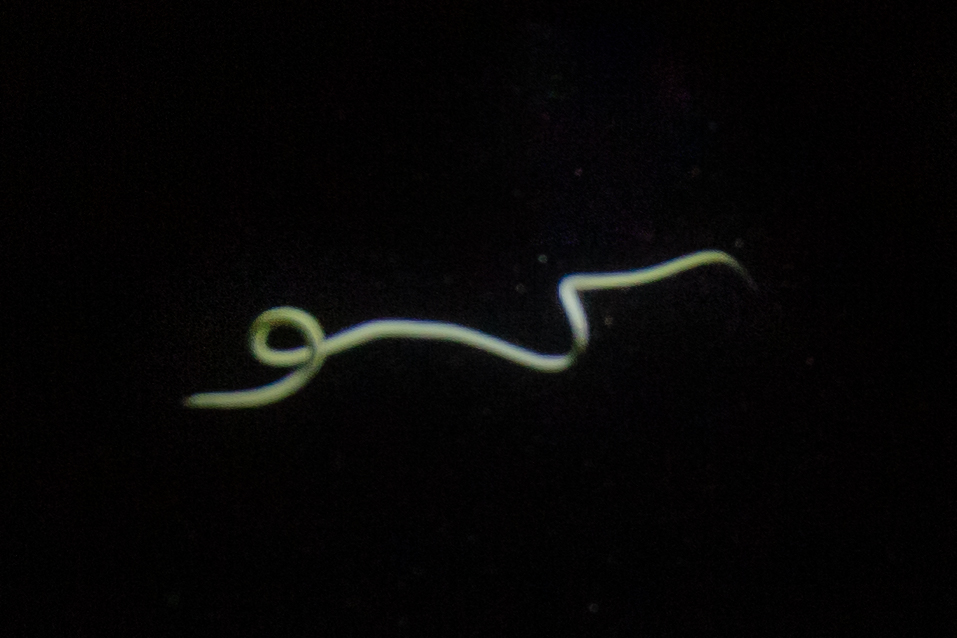
- Olavius algarvensis

Scientific classification
- Domain: Eukaryota
- Kingdom: Animalia
- Phylum: Annelida
- Clade: Pleistoannelida
- Clade: Sedentaria
- Class: Clitellata
- Order: Tubificida
- Suborder: Tubificina

Families
- Phreodrilidae; Tubificidae

= Tubificina =

Suborder of annelids

Tubificina is a suborder of haplotaxid annelid worms.
