= Drawida ganini =

Scientific classification
- Domain: Eukaryota
- Kingdom: Animalia
- Phylum: Annelida
- Clade: Pleistoannelida
- Clade: Sedentaria
- Class: Clitellata
- Order: Moniligastrida
- Family: Moniligastridae
- Genus: Drawida
- Species: D. ganini

Binomial name
- Drawida ganini Zhang and Wu, 2018

Species of earthworm

Drawida ganini is a species of earthworm from the family Moniligastridae, and of the genus Drawida. It is collected from the Muling River. The general locale of these samples originate in Northeast China and the bordering Eastern Russia.

Drawida ganini's status as a new species came to be after a calculation in genetic difference from Drawida ghilarovi.
