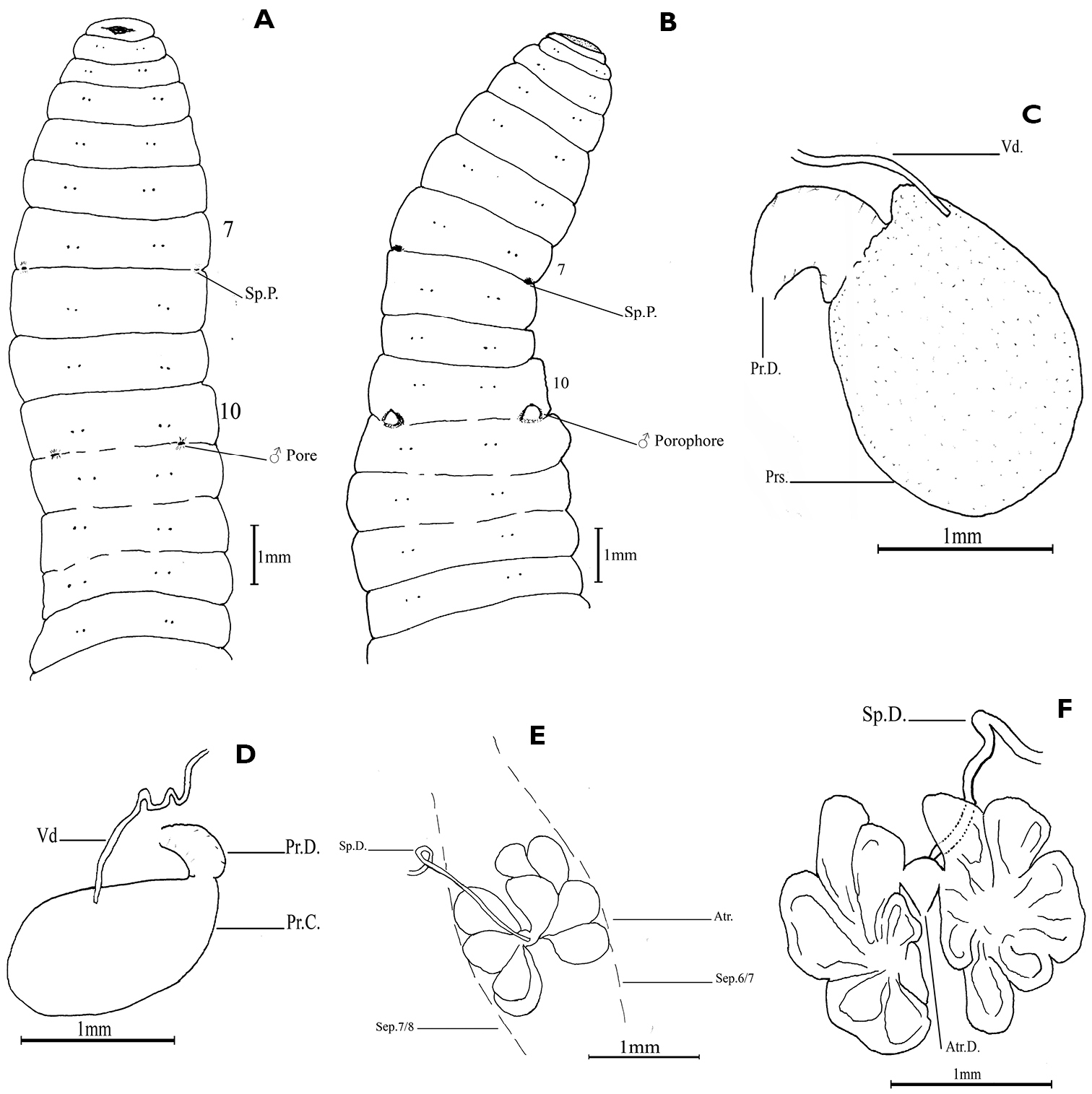

Scientific classification
- Kingdom: Animalia
- Phylum: Annelida
- Clade: Pleistoannelida
- Clade: Sedentaria
- Class: Clitellata
- Order: Moniligastrida
- Family: Moniligastridae
- Genus: Drawida
- Species: D. polydiverticulata

Binomial name
- Drawida polydiverticulata Narayanan & Julka, 2017

= Drawida polydiverticulata =

Species of annelid worm

Drawida polydiverticulata is a species of earthworm from family Moniligastridae found from shola grasslands of the Munnar region in Kerala.

Drawida polydiverticulata has multiple lobes, also called diverticulums; an organ located in the front of its body, are unique amongst the members of the genus.
