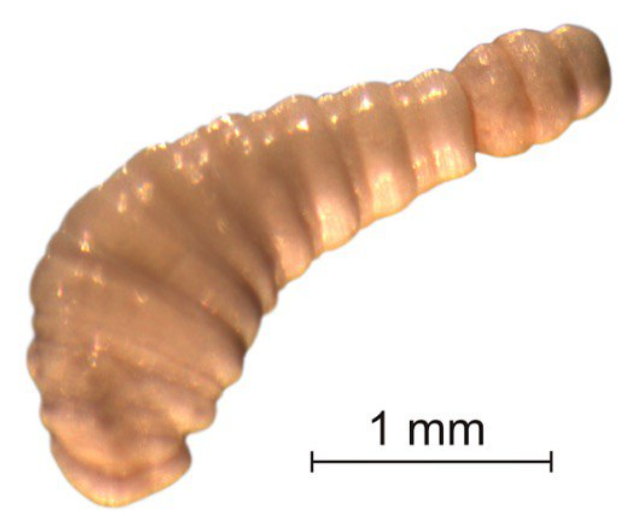
- Branchiobdella hexadonta, adult specimen

Scientific classification
- Kingdom: Animalia
- Phylum: Annelida
- Clade: Pleistoannelida
- Clade: Sedentaria
- Class: Clitellata
- Order: Branchiobdellida
- Family: Branchiobdellidae
- Genus: Branchiobdella; Odier, 1823

= Branchiobdella =

Genus of annelid worms

Branchiobdella is a genus of Branchiobdellidae.

The genus was described in 1823 by Odier.

It has cosmopolitan distribution.

Species:

- Branchiobdella astaci Odier, 1823
- Branchiobdella balcanica Moszynski, 1938
- Branchiobdella bulgariensis Subchev & Rimcheska, 2021
- Branchiobdella cheni Liu, 1964
- Branchiobdella domina Timm, 1991
- Branchiobdella hexadonta Gruber, 1883
- Branchiobdella italica Canegallo, 1928
- Branchiobdella kobayashii Yamaguchi, 1934
- Branchiobdella kozarovi Subchev, 1978
- Branchiobdella macroperistomium Liu & Zhang, 1983
- Branchiobdella minuta Pierantoni, 1912
- Branchiobdella monodontus Liu & Zhang, 1983
- Branchiobdella orientalis Yamaguchi, 1934
- Branchiobdella papillosa Nesemann & Hutter, 2002
- Branchiobdella parasita (Braun, 1805)
- Branchiobdella pentadonta Whitman, 1882
- Branchiobdella teresae Subchev, 1986
- Branchiobdella tetrodonta Pierantoni, 1906
