= Hormogaster =

Scientific classification
- Domain: Eukaryota
- Kingdom: Animalia
- Phylum: Annelida
- Clade: Pleistoannelida
- Clade: Sedentaria
- Class: Clitellata
- Order: Haplotaxida
- Family: Hormogastridae
- Genus: Hormogaster; Rosa, 1887

Genus of roundworms

Hormogaster is a genus of annelids belonging to the family Hormogastridae.

The species of this genus are found in Europe.

Species:

- Hormogaster abbatissae Novo & Díaz Cosín, 2012
- Hormogaster abbatissae Rosa, 1887
- Hormogaster arenicola Qiu & Bouché, 1998
- Hormogaster castillana Qiu & Bouché, 1998
- Hormogaster catalaunensis Qiu & Bouché, 1998
