= Eudrilus =

Scientific classification
- Domain: Eukaryota
- Kingdom: Animalia
- Phylum: Annelida
- Clade: Pleistoannelida
- Clade: Sedentaria
- Class: Clitellata
- Order: Opisthopora
- Suborder: Lumbricina
- Family: Eudrilidae
- Genus: Eudrilus; Perrier, 1871

Genus of annelids

Eudrilus is a genus of annelids belonging to the family Eudrilidae.

Species:

- Eudrilus eugeniae (Kinberg, 1866)
- Eudrilus kamerunensis Michaelsen, 1903
- Eudrilus milliemosbyae Owa, 1996
- Eudrilus pallidus Michaelsen, 1891
- Eudrilus simplex Michaelsen, 1913
- Eudrilus sodeindei Owa, 1996
