= Vignysa =

Scientific classification
- Kingdom: Animalia
- Phylum: Annelida
- Clade: Pleistoannelida
- Clade: Sedentaria
- Class: Clitellata
- Order: Haplotaxida
- Family: Hormogastridae
- Genus: Vignysa; Bouché, 1970

Genus of annelid worms

Vignysa is a genus of annelids belonging to the family Hormogastridae.

The species of this genus are found in Europe.

Species:

- Vignysa popi Bouché, 1970
- Vignysa teres
- Vignysa vedovinii Rota, 1994
