= Delaya =

Scientific classification
- Kingdom: Animalia
- Phylum: Annelida
- Clade: Pleistoannelida
- Clade: Sedentaria
- Class: Clitellata
- Order: Haplotaxida
- Family: Haplotaxidae
- Genus: Delaya; Brinkhurst, 1988

Genus of annelid worms

Delaya is a genus of annelids belonging to the family Haplotaxidae.

The species of this genus are found in Europe.

Species:

- Delaya bureschi (Michaelsen, 1925)
- Delaya cantabronensis (Delay, 1973)
- Delaya corbarensis (Delay, 1972)
- Delaya leruthi (Hrabĕ, 1958)
- Delaya navarrensis (Delay, 1973)
