= Cambarincola =

Scientific classification
- Kingdom: Animalia
- Phylum: Annelida
- Clade: Pleistoannelida
- Clade: Sedentaria
- Class: Clitellata
- Order: Branchiobdellida
- Family: Branchiobdellidae
- Genus: Cambarincola; Ellis, 1912

Genus of annelid worms

Cambarincola is a genus of annelids belonging to the family Branchiobdellidae.

The species of this genus are found in Europe and Northern America.

Species:

- Cambarincola acudentatus Holt, 1973
- Cambarincola alienus Holt, 1963
- Cambarincola barbarae Holt, 1981
