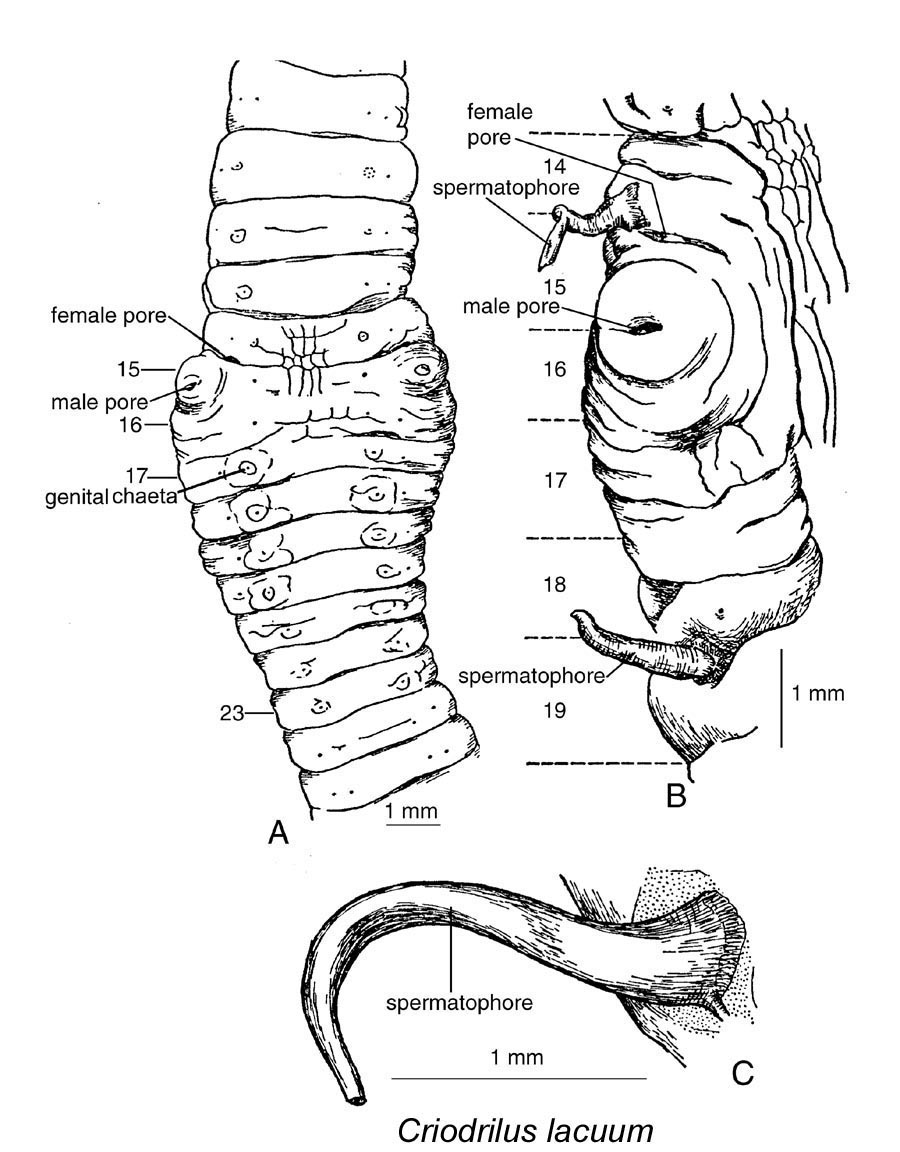
- Criodrilus lacuum

Scientific classification
- Kingdom: Animalia
- Phylum: Annelida
- Clade: Pleistoannelida
- Clade: Sedentaria
- Class: Clitellata
- Order: Haplotaxida
- Family: Criodrilidae
- Genus: Criodrilus; Hoffmeister, 1845

Synonyms
- Criadilus Udekem, 1855

= Criodrilus =

Genus of annelid worms

Criodrilus is a genus of annelids belonging to the family Criodrilidae, described in 1845 by Wilhelm Hoffmeister.

The species of this genus are found in Europe and America.

Species:

- Criodrilus aidae Righi, 1994
- Criodrilus lacuum Hoffmeister, 1845
- Criodrilus miyashitai Nagase & Nomura, 1937
- Criodrilus venezuelanus Righi & Molina, 1994
