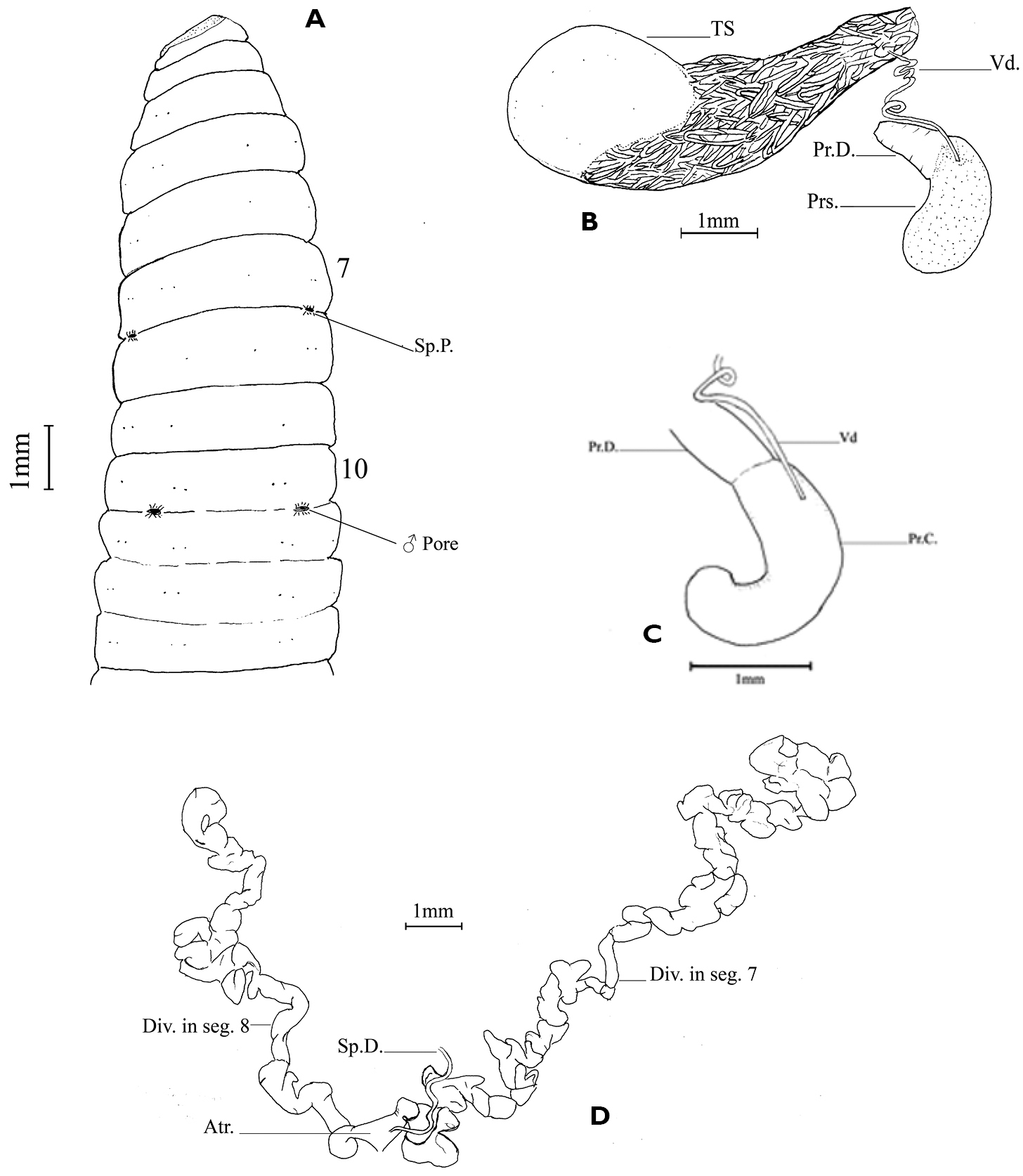

Scientific classification
- Kingdom: Animalia
- Phylum: Annelida
- Clade: Pleistoannelida
- Clade: Sedentaria
- Class: Clitellata
- Order: Moniligastrida
- Family: Moniligastridae
- Genus: Drawida
- Species: D. thomasi

Binomial name
- Drawida thomasi Narayanan & Julka, 2017

= Drawida thomasi =

Species of annelid worm

Drawida thomasi is a species of earthworm found from Kakkadampoyil in Kerala. It belongs to the primitive family, Moniligastridae. D. thomasi is approximately 5 cm long and bluish in colour.

Drawida thomasi is named in honour of A.P. Thomas, director of M.G. University's Advanced Centre of Environmental Studies and Sustainable Development, “for initiating taxonomic studies on earthworms of Kerala.”
