= Xironogiton =

Scientific classification
- Kingdom: Animalia
- Phylum: Annelida
- Clade: Pleistoannelida
- Clade: Sedentaria
- Class: Clitellata
- Order: Branchiobdellida
- Family: Branchiobdellidae
- Genus: Xironogiton; Ellis, 1919

Genus of annelid worms

Xironogiton is a genus of annelids belonging to the family Branchiobdellidae.

The species of this genus are found in Europe and Northern America.

Species:

- Xironogiton cassiensis Holt, 1974
- Xironogiton fordi Holt, 1974
- Xironogiton instabilius (Moore, 1894)
- Xironogiton kittitasi Holt, 1974
- Xironogiton occidentalis Ellis, 1919
- Xironogiton victoriensis Gelder & Hall, 1990
