= Xana (disambiguation) =

Xana is an Asturian mythical entity, as well as a female given name.

Xana, X.A.N.A. or XANA may also refer to:

== Given name ==
- Xana Antunes (1964–2020), British business journalist
- Xana Qubadî (1700–1759), Kurdish poet
- Xana (musician), Canadian pop musician

== Other ==
- Xana (annelid), a genus of annelids in the family Hormogastridae
- Xana, a genus of wasps in the family Signiphoridae
- X.A.N.A., the main antagonist of Code Lyoko
