= Xana (annelid) =

Scientific classification
- Domain: Eukaryota
- Kingdom: Animalia
- Phylum: Annelida
- Clade: Pleistoannelida
- Clade: Sedentaria
- Class: Clitellata
- Order: Haplotaxida
- Family: Hormogastridae
- Genus: Xana; Cosín, Briones & Trigo, 1989

Genus of worms

Xana is a genus of annelids belonging to the family Hormogastridae.

The species of this genus are found in Europe.

Species:

- Xana omodeoi Cosín, Briones & Trigo, 1989
