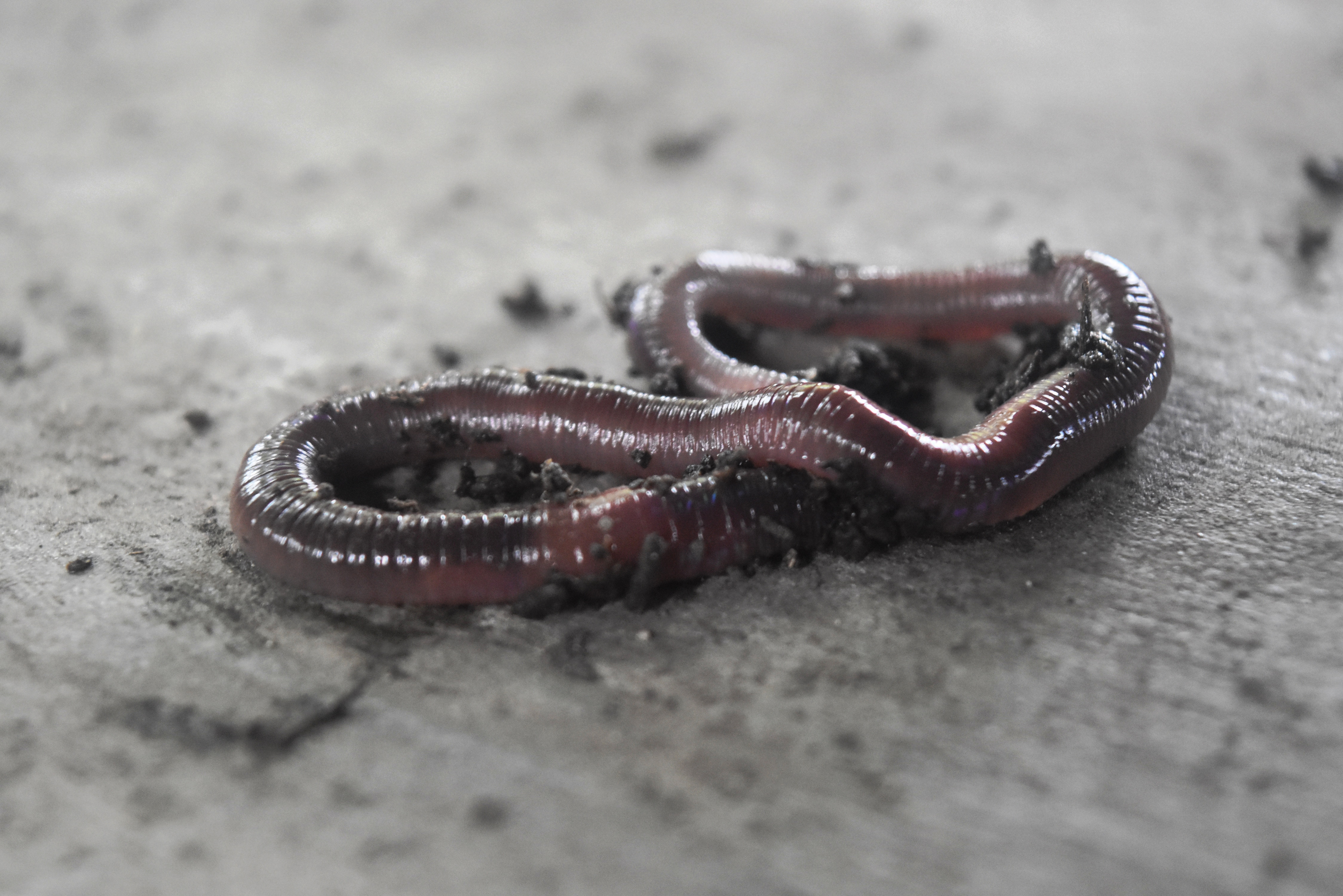

Scientific classification
- Kingdom: Animalia
- Phylum: Annelida
- Clade: Pleistoannelida
- Clade: Sedentaria
- Class: Clitellata
- Order: Opisthopora
- Suborder: Lumbricina
- Family: Eudrilidae
- Genus: Eudrilus
- Species: E. eugeniae

Binomial name
- Eudrilus eugeniae (Kinberg, 1867)

= Eudrilus eugeniae =

Species of annelid

Eudrilus eugeniae, also called the "African nightcrawler", is an earthworm species native to tropical west Africa and now widespread in warm regions under vermicompost; it is an excellent source of protein and has great pharmaceutical potential.

== Growth ==
Fecundity, growth, maturation and biomass production were all significantly greater at 25 °C than 15°, 20°or 30°. {25 °C = 77 °F}

The growth of individual earthworms increases as the population density lowers, but the greatest overall earthworm biomass production occurs at the highest population density.

The greatest number of cocoons per week and the number of hatchlings per cocoon are obtained at 25 °C. Cocoons of E. eugeniae hatched in only 12 days at 25 °C, and the worms reach sexual maturity in as little as 35 days after hatching.

== Etymology and taxonomy ==
Named after Johan Gustaf Hjalmar Kinberg's Swedish survey ship, the 'Eugenie'. This species was first described by Hjalmar Kinberg in 1867 and originally named Lumbricus eugeniae.

== Life cycle ==
Throughout its life cycle, E. eugeniae grows much more rapidly than Eisenia fetida, in similar environmental conditions. The African nightcrawler grows well at a temperature of 24–30 °C (75–86 °F). Maximum weight of around 2.5 grams occurs within 8–10 weeks.

The African nightcrawler has a uniform purple-grey sheen and the posterior segments are evenly tapered to a point. The segments of the brandling worm (Eisenia fetida) alternate reddish-orange and brown; the posterior segments do not taper, and the final segment is blunt.
