= Drawida =

Scientific classification
- Kingdom: Animalia
- Phylum: Annelida
- Clade: Pleistoannelida
- Clade: Sedentaria
- Class: Clitellata
- Order: Moniligastrida
- Family: Moniligastridae
- Genus: Drawida; Michaelsen, 1900

Genus of annelid worms

Drawida is a genus of annelids belonging to the family Moniligastridae.

The species of this genus are found in Southern Asia and Malesia.

Species:

- Drawida abscisa Gates, 1931
- Drawida aculeata Gates, 1945
- Drawida affinis Stephenson, 1917
- Drawida agricola Stephenson, 1925
- Drawida alishanensis Shen, Chang & Chih, 2018
- Drawida ampullacea Gates, 1945
- Drawida ancisa Gates, 1933
- Drawida annamensis Michaelsen, 1934
- Drawida annandalei Stephenson, 1913
- Drawida aruna Julka, 1981
- Drawida assamensis Gates, 1945
- Drawida barwelli (Beddard, 1886)
- Drawida beiganica Shen & C.-H.Chang, 2015
- Drawida bifida Gates, 1945
- Drawida bimaculata Zhong, 1992
- Drawida bodgarti Stephenson, 1917
- Drawida brunnea Stephenson, 1915
- Drawida bullata Gates, 1933
- Drawida burchardi Michaelsen, 1903
- Drawida cacharensis Stephenson, 1926
- Drawida caenosa Gates, 1945
- Drawida caerula
- Drawida caerulea Gates, 1926
- Drawida calebi Gates, 1945
- Drawida chalakudiana Stephenson, 1915
- Drawida changbaishanensis Wu & Sun, 1996
- Drawida chapaensis Do & Huynh, 1993
- Drawida cheni Gates, 1935
- Drawida cheni W-X.Zhang, J-X.Li & Qiu, 2006
- Drawida circumpapillatus Aiyer, 1929
- Drawida companio Blakemore, 2014
- Drawida constricta Gates, 1929
- Drawida coonoorensis Gates, 1945
- Drawida decourcyi Stephenson, 1914
- Drawida delicata Gates, 1962
- Drawida dolosa Gates, 1945
- Drawida dongyinica Shen & C.-H.Chang, 2015
- Drawida duttai Julka, 1981
- Drawida eda Blakemore, 2010
- Drawida elegans Rao, 1921
- Drawida exilis Gates, 1945
- Drawida fakir Cognetti, 1911
- Drawida fausta Gates, 1945
- Drawida fenqihuensis Shen, Chang & Chih, 2018
- Drawida ferina Gates, 1945
- Drawida flexa Gates, 1929
- Drawida fluviatilis Stephenson, 1924
- Drawida fucosa Gates, 1933
- Drawida ganini Zhang and Wu, 2018
- Drawida ghatensis Michaelsen, 1910
- Drawida ghilarovi Gates, 1969
- Drawida gisti Michaelsen, 1931
- Drawida glabella Y.Chen, 1938
- Drawida gracilis Gates, 1925
- Drawida grahami Gates, 1935
- Drawida guryeensis Y.Hong, 2002
- Drawida hatai Oishi, 1932
- Drawida hattamimizu Hatai, 1930
- Drawida hattamlnizu Hatai, 1930
- Drawida heterochaetus Michaelsen, 1922
- Drawida hodgarti Stephenson, 1917
- Drawida impertusa
- Drawida iucn Blakemore, 2013
- Drawida jalpaigurensis Stephenson, 1916
- Drawida jeholensis Kobayashi, 1941
- Drawida jirisanensis Y.Hong, 2002
- Drawida kamakuraensis Oishi, 1932
- Drawida kambarai Oishi, 1932
- Drawida kanarensis Stephenson, 1917
- Drawida keikiensis Kobayashi, 1938
- Drawida kempi Stephenson, 1914
- Drawida koreana Kobayashi, 1938
- Drawida lacertosa Gates, 1930
- Drawida langsonensis Do, 1993
- Drawida lennora Gates, 1945
- Drawida limella Gates, 1934
- Drawida linhaiensis Y.Chen, 1933
- Drawida longatria Gates, 1925
- Drawida loricata Gates, 1945
- Drawida malayana Gates, 1938
- Drawida matthaii Michaelsen, 1910
- Drawida minutus (Bourne, 1887)
- Drawida modesta Rao, 1921
- Drawida molesta Gates, 1933
- Drawida montana Gates, 1945
- Drawida moriokaensis Ohfuchi, 1938
- Drawida mysorensis Gates, 1945
- Drawida nagana Gates, 1945
- Drawida nandiensis Stephenson, 1924
- Drawida nemora Kobayashi, 1936
- Drawida nepalensis Michaelsen, 1907
- Drawida ofunatoensis Ohfuchi, 1938
- Drawida omeiana Y.Chen, 1946
- Drawida papillifer Stephenson, 1917
- Drawida paradoxa Rao, 1921
- Drawida parambikulamana Stephenson, 1915
- Drawida peguana Gates, 1925
- Drawida pellucida Stephenson, 1914
- Drawida periodiosa Gates, 1934
- Drawida periodosa Gates, 1934
- Drawida polydiverticulata Narayanan & Julka, 2017
- Drawida pomella Gates, 1934
- Drawida propatula Gates, 1935
- Drawida ramnadana Michaelsen, 1907
- Drawida rangamatiana Stephenson, 1917
- Drawida rangoonensis Gates, 1925
- Drawida rara Gates, 1925
- Drawida raui Stephenson, 1921
- Drawida robusta (Bourne, 1887)
- Drawida rosea Stephenson, 1922
- Drawida rotungana Stephenson, 1914
- Drawida sapphirinoides (Bourne, 1894)
- Drawida scandens Rao, 1921
- Drawida schunkarai Michaelsen, 1914
- Drawida sepulta Gates, 1931
- Drawida setosus Michaelsen, 1934
- Drawida sinica Y.Chen, 1933
- Drawida somavarpatana Rao, 1921
- Drawida songae Y.Hong, 2002
- Drawida spissata Gates, 1930
- Drawida sulcata Michaelsen, 1907
- Drawida sulcata Zhong, 1986
- Drawida syringa Y.Chen, 1933
- Drawida tairaensis Ohfuchi, 1938
- Drawida tecta Gates, 1926
- Drawida tenellula Gates, 1962
- Drawida thomasi Narayanan & Julka, 2017
- Drawida thurstoni Gates, 1945
- Drawida thurtoni Gates, 1945
- Drawida tihenensis Julka, 1976
- Drawida tihunensis Julka, 1976
- Drawida torini Oishi, 1932
- Drawida toriui Oishi, 1932
- Drawida tosaensis Oishi, 1932
- Drawida travancorense Michaelsen, 1910
- Drawida travancorensis Michaelsen, 1910
- Drawida troglodytes Stephenson, 1924
- Drawida tumida Gates, 1929
- Drawida victoriana Gates, 1962
- Drawida vulgaris Gates, 1930
- Drawida willsi Michaelsen, 1907
- Drawida zhangetalia Blakemore, 2006
