= Haplotaxis =

Scientific classification
- Domain: Eukaryota
- Kingdom: Animalia
- Phylum: Annelida
- Clade: Pleistoannelida
- Clade: Sedentaria
- Class: Clitellata
- Order: Haplotaxida
- Family: Haplotaxidae
- Genus: Haplotaxis; Hoffmeister, 1843

Genus of annelid worms

Haplotaxis is a genus of annelids belonging to the family Haplotaxidae.

The genus has cosmopolitan distribution.

Species:

- Haplotaxis acystis Michaelsen, 1903
- Haplotaxis aedeochaeta Brinkhurst & Marchese, 1987
- Haplotaxis ascaridoides Michaelsen, 1905
- Haplotaxis bretscheri Cognetti, 1903
- Haplotaxis carnivorus Omodeo, 1958
- Haplotaxis dubius (Hrabĕ, 1931)
- Haplotaxis emissarius (Forbes, 1890)
- Haplotaxis gastrochaetus Yamaguchi, 1953
