= Parvidrilus =

Scientific classification
- Kingdom: Animalia
- Phylum: Annelida
- Clade: Pleistoannelida
- Clade: Sedentaria
- Class: Clitellata
- Order: Haplotaxida
- Family: Parvidrilidae; Erséus, 1999
- Genus: Parvidrilus; Erséus, 1999

Genus of annelid worms

Parvidrilus is a genus of annelids belonging to the monotypic family Parvidrilidae.

The species of this genus are found in Europe.

Species:

- Parvidrilus camachoi Martínez-Ansemil & Sambugar, 2012
- Parvidrilus gianii Martínez-Ansemil & Sambugar, 2012
- Parvidrilus gineti (Juget, 1959)
- Parvidrilus jugeti DesChâtelliers & Martin, 2012
- Parvidrilus meyssonnieri DesChâtelliers & Martin, 2012
- Parvidrilus spelaeus Martínez-Ansemil, Sambugar & Giani, 2002
- Parvidrilus stochi Sambugar & Martínez-Ansemil, 2012
- Parvidrilus strayeri Erséus, 1999
- Parvidrilus tomasini Sambugar & Martínez-Ansemil, 2012
