= Haplotaxidae =

Scientific classification
- Kingdom: Animalia
- Phylum: Annelida
- Clade: Pleistoannelida
- Clade: Sedentaria
- Class: Clitellata
- Order: Haplotaxida
- Family: Haplotaxidae; Michaelsen, 1900

Genera
- Alphadrilus; Delaya; Haplotaxis; Hologynus; Metataxis; Omodeodrilus; Pelodrilus

Family of annelids

Haplotaxidae is a family of earthworms of the Haplotaxida order.

== Genera ==
- Alphadrilus Brinkhurst, 1988
- Delaya Brinkhurst, 1988
- Haplotaxis Hoffmeister, 1843
- Hologynus Brinkhurst, 1988
- Metataxis Righi, 1985
- Omodeodrilus Kammerer, 2006
- Pelodrilus Beddard, 1891
