= Opistocystidae =

Scientific classification
- Domain: Eukaryota
- Kingdom: Animalia
- Phylum: Annelida
- Clade: Pleistoannelida
- Clade: Sedentaria
- Class: Clitellata
- Order: Haplotaxida
- Family: Opistocystidae

Family of annelid worms

Opistocystidae is a family of annelids belonging to the order Haplotaxida.

Genera:

- Crustipellis Harman & Loden, 1978
- Opistocysta Černosvitov, 1936
- Trieminentia Harman & Loden, 1978
