= Branchiobdellidae =

Scientific classification
- Domain: Eukaryota
- Kingdom: Animalia
- Phylum: Annelida
- Clade: Pleistoannelida
- Clade: Sedentaria
- Class: Clitellata
- Order: Branchiobdellida
- Family: Branchiobdellidae

Family of annelids

Branchiobdellidae is the singular family of annelids belonging to the monotypic order Branchiobdellida.

== Genera ==
Genera:

- Ankyrodrilus Holt, 1965
- Bdellodrilus Moore, 1895
- Branchiobdella Odier, 1823
- Cambarinicola Ellis, 1912
- Caridinophila Liang, 1963
- Ceratodrilus Hall, 1914
- Cirrodrilus Pierantoni, 1905
- Cronodrilus Holt, 1968
- Ellisodrilus Holt, 1960
- Forbesodrilus Gelder, 2011
- Hidejiodrilus Gelder & Brinkhurst, 1990
- Holtodrilus Gelder & Brinkhurst, 1990
- Magmatodrilus Holt, 1967
- Oedipodrilus Holt, 1967
- Pterodrilus Moore, 1895
- Sathodrilus Holt, 1968
- Sinodrilus Gelder & Brinkhurst, 1990
- Tettodrilus Holt, 1968
- Triannulata Goodnight, 1940
- Uglukodrilus Holt, 1989
- Xironodrilus Ellis, 1918
- Xironogiton Ellis, 1919
