= Ectosymbiosis =

Symbiosis in which the symbiont lives on the body surface of the host

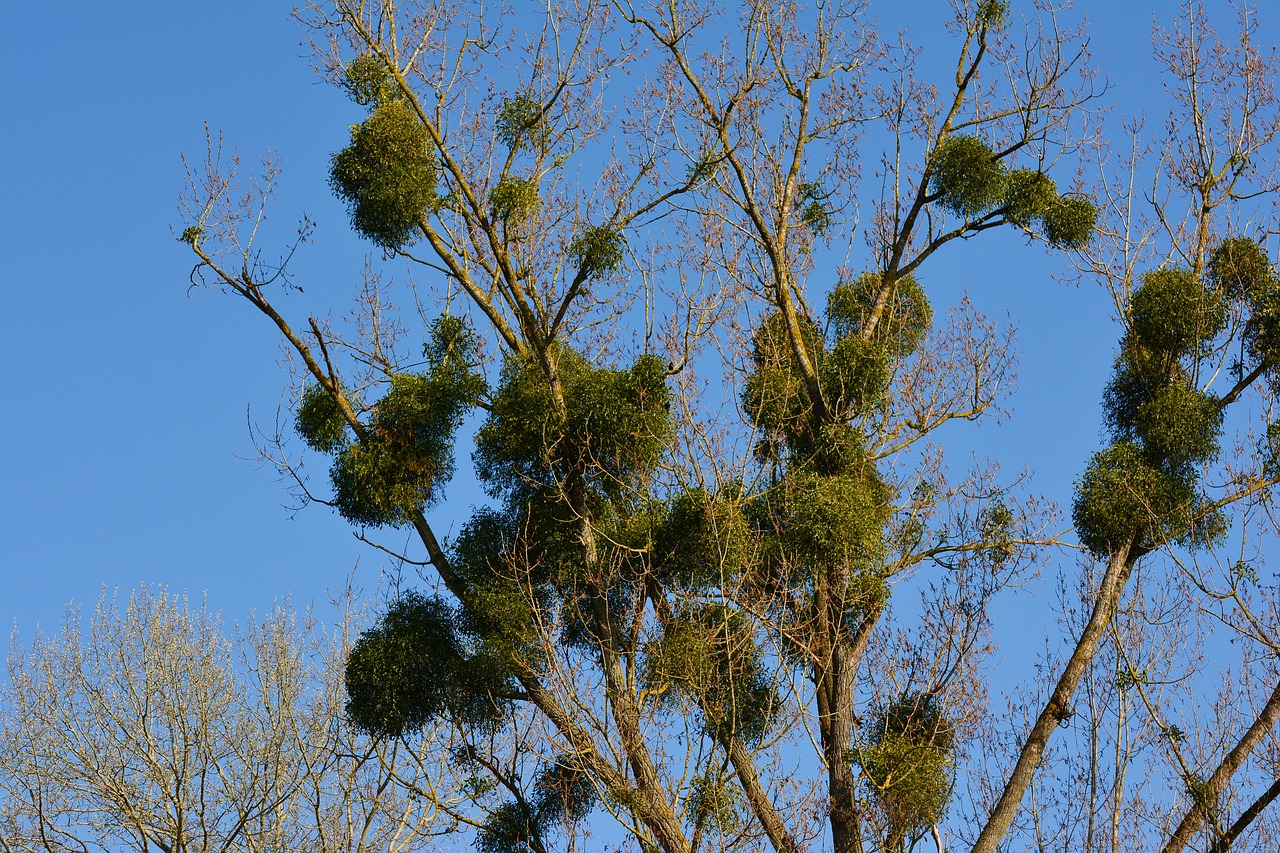
European mistletoe is an example of an ectosymbiotic parasite that lives on top of trees and removes nutrients and water.

Ectosymbiosis is a form of symbiotic behavior in which an organism lives on the body surface of another organism (the host), including internal surfaces such as the lining of the digestive tube and the ducts of glands. The ectosymbiotic species, or ectosymbiont, is generally an immobile (or sessile) organism existing off of biotic substrate through mutualism, commensalism, or parasitism. Ectosymbiosis is found throughout a diverse array of environments and in many different species.

In some species the symbiotic environment provided by both the parasite and host are mutually beneficial. In recent research it has been found that these micro-flora will evolve and diversify rapidly in response to a change in the external environment, in order to stabilize and maintain a beneficial ectosymbiotic environment.

== Evolutionary history ==
Ectosymbiosis has evolved independently many times to fill a wide variety of ecological niches, both temperate and extreme. Such temperate regions include the seas off the coast of Singapore while the extreme regions reach to the depths of Antarctica and hydrothermal vents. It likely evolved as a niche specialization, which allowed for greater diversity in ectosymbiotic behavior among species. Additionally, in the case of mutualism, the evolution improved the fitness of both species involved, propagating the success of ectosymbiosis. Ectosymbiosis has independently evolved through convergent evolution in all domains of life.

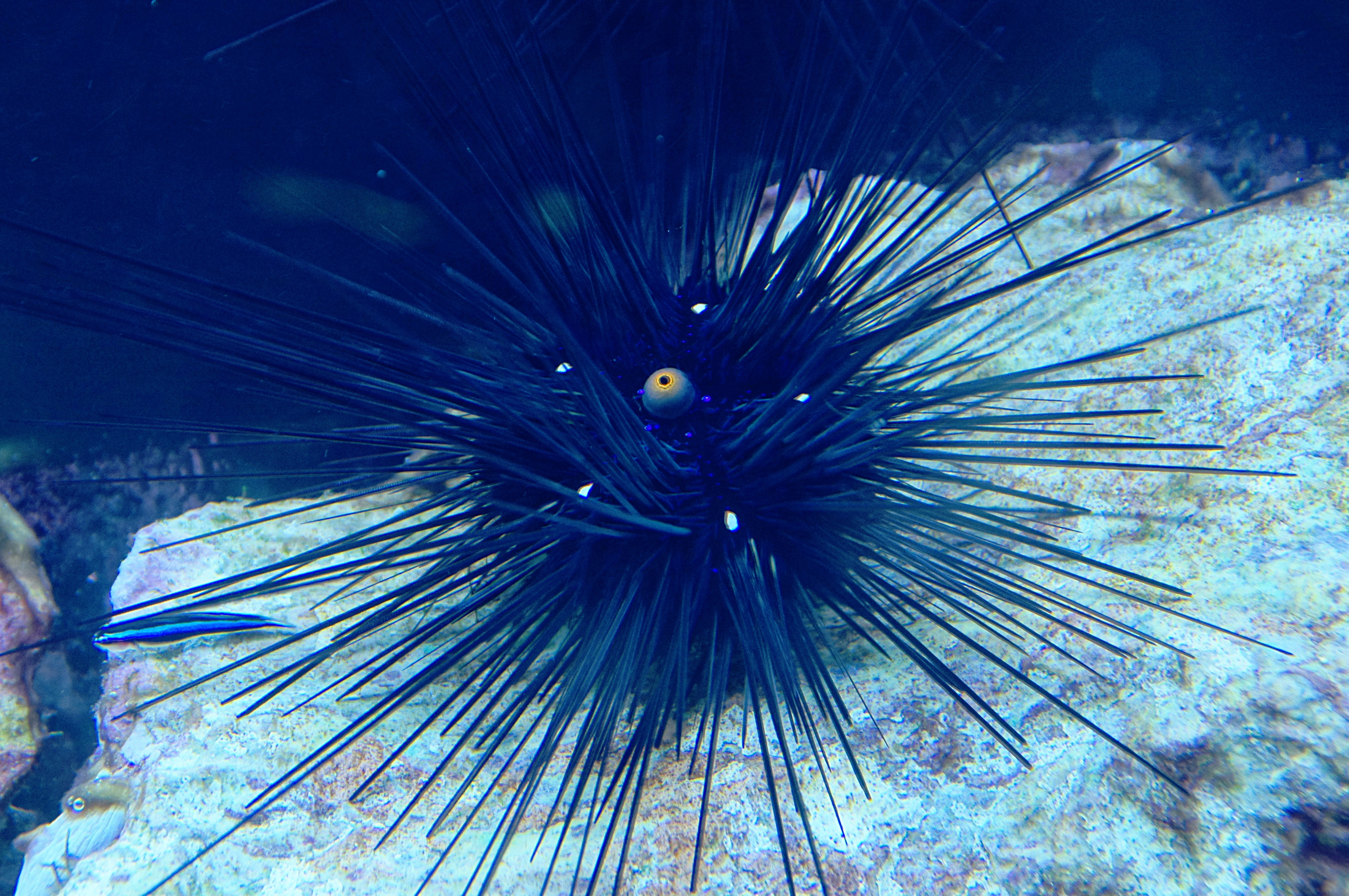
Sea urchins, with their many spines, provide protection for the ectosymbiotic parasites that live on them.

Ectosymbiosis allows niches to form that would otherwise be unable to exist without the support of their host. Inherently, this added niche opens up a new branch off of the evolutionary tree. The evolutionary success of ectosymbiosis is based on the benefits experienced by the ectosymbiont and the host. Due to the dependence of the parasite on the host and the associated benefits and cost to both the parasite and host, the two will continue to coevolve as explained by the Red Queen hypothesis. The Red Queen hypothesis states that a host will continually evolve defenses against a parasitic attack, and the parasite species will also adapt to these changes in the host defense, the result being competitive coevolution between the two species.

Ectosymbiosis adds to the biodiversity of the environment, whether on land, in freshwater, in deserts, or in deep sea vents. Specifically, ectosymbiosis provides a new niche or environment from which many new species can differentiate and flourish.

This niche specialization between species also leads to stabilization of symbiotic relationships between sessile and motile organisms. The ectosymbiont can increase the fitness of their host by assisting with metabolism, nitrogen fixation, or cleaning the host organism. The diversity of advantages has yet to be fully explored, but by virtue of persisting throughout all of recent evolution, they likely confer an adaptive advantage to many of the species that exist solely due to ectosymbiosis.

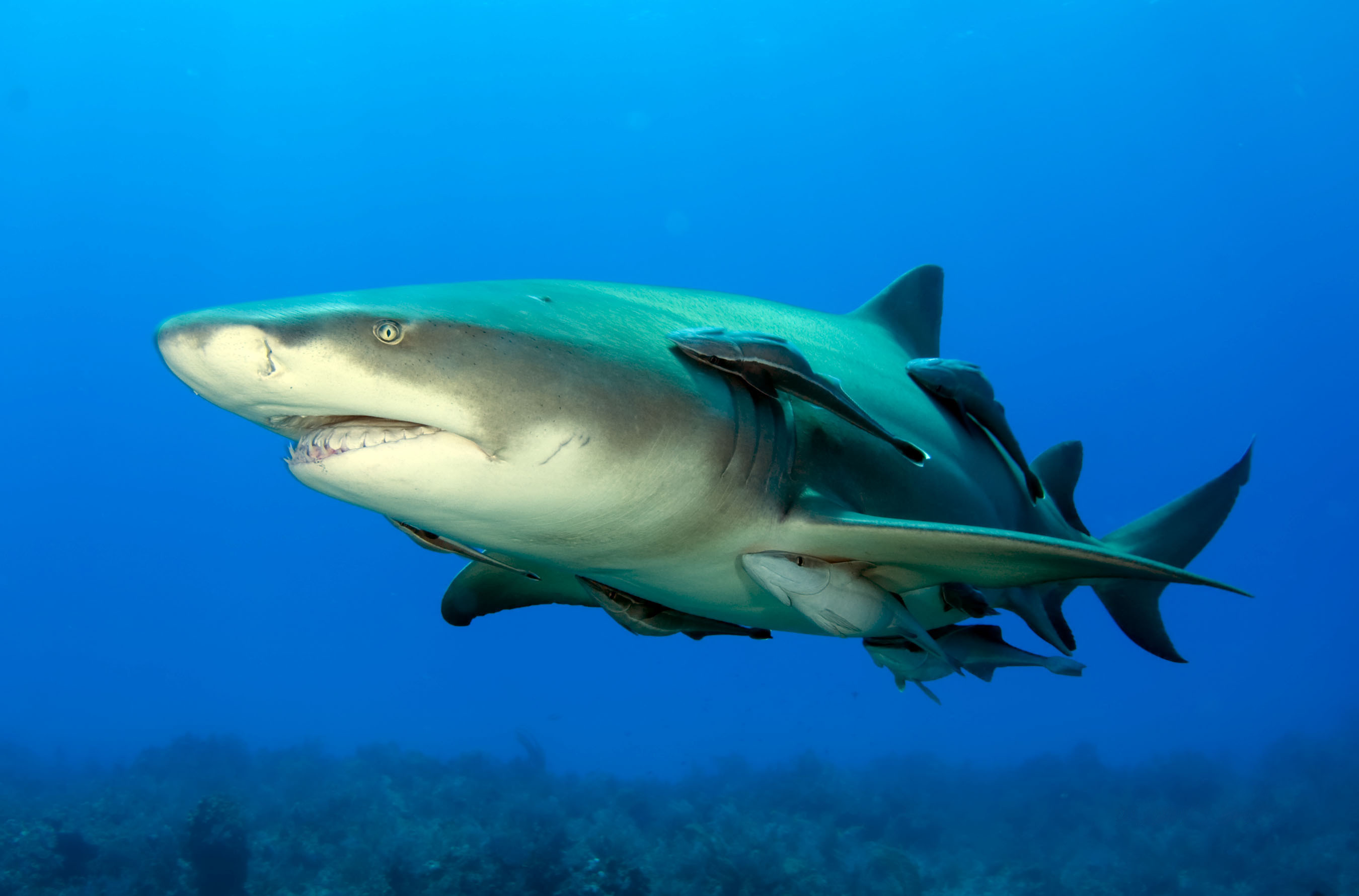
Remora fish form ectosymbiotic commensal interactions with lemon sharks in order to scavenge food and travel long distances.

== Types of host and parasite dynamic ==
Although ectosymbiosis is typically an evolutionary stable behavior, the different host and parasite dynamics independently vary in their stability.

=== Commensalism ===
Commensalism is a form of symbiosis where one species is benefiting from the interactions between species and the other is neither helped nor harmed from the interaction. Ectosymbiotic commensalistic behavior is found frequently in organisms that attach themselves to larger species in order to move long distances or scavenge food easily; this is documented in remoras which attach to sharks to scavenge and travel. An additional ectosymbiotic example of commensalism is the relationship between small sessile organisms and echinoids in the Southern ocean, where the echinoids provide substrate for the small organisms to grow and the echinoids remain unaffected.

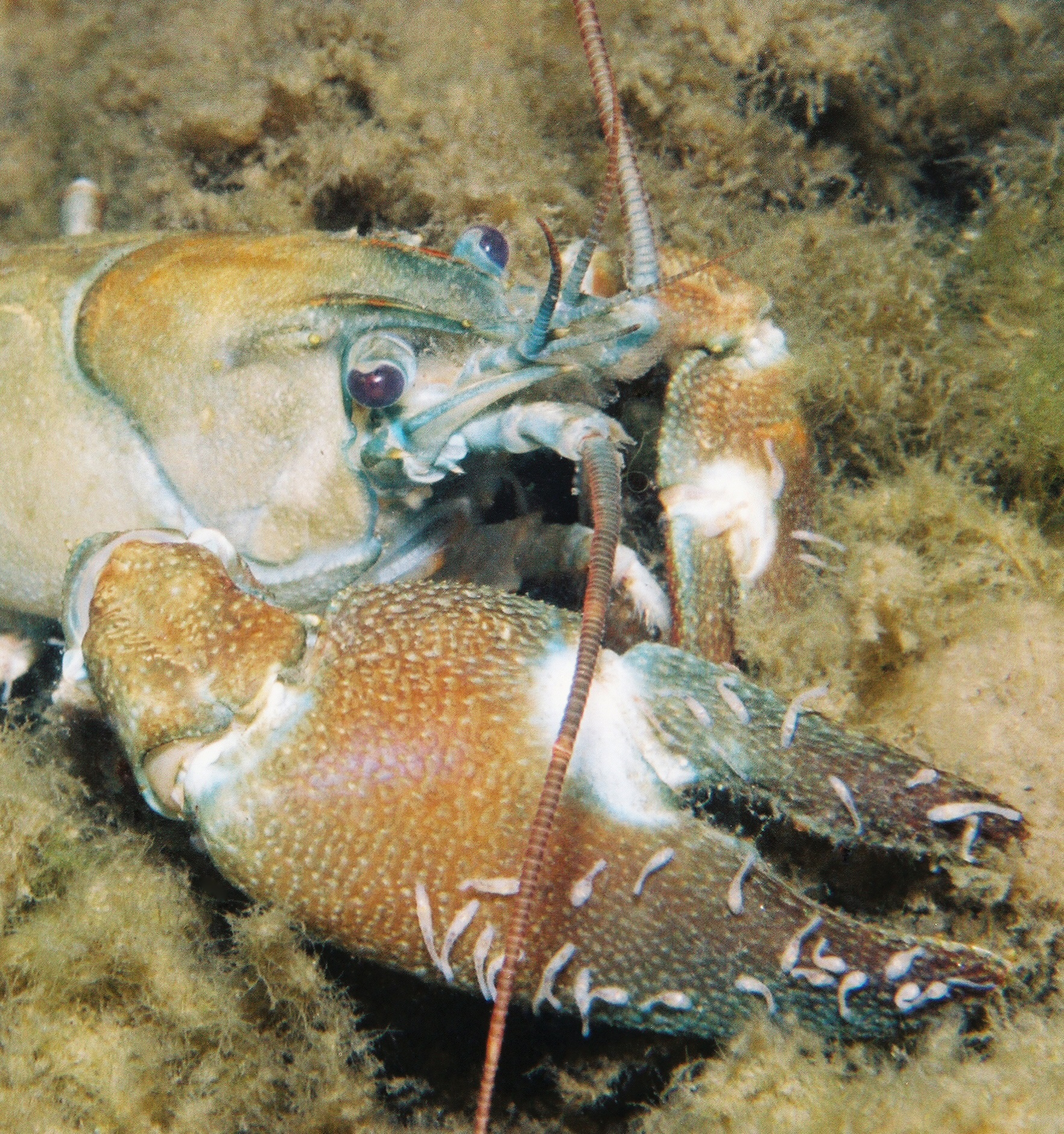
Branchiobdellid annelids are mutualistic parasites. They will attach to a signal crayfish and feed on diatoms, bacteria, and protozoans that accumulate on the exoskeleton.

=== Mutualism ===
Mutualism is a form of ectosymbiosis where both the host and parasitic species benefit from the interaction. There are many examples of mutualistic ectosymbiosis that occur in nature. One such relationship is between Branchiobdellida and crayfish in which the Branchiobdellida acts as a bacterial gut cleaner for the crayfish species. Another example is the iron-oxide associated chemoautotrophic bacteria found crusted to the gills of Rimicaris exoculata shrimp that provide the shrimp with vital organic material for their survival while simultaneously supporting the bacteria with different organic material that the bacterial cannot produce itself. Groups of organisms – greater than a single pair of a host and parasite – can also form mutualistic ectosymbiotic interactions. Bark beetles can work in a dynamic mutualistic fashion with fungi and mites attached to their exoskeletons, both of which feed off of trees to provide vital energy to the beetles while the beetles provide necessary organic material to the fungi and mites to survive. In this case, the relationship between the fungi and mites is functional because while both do the same job, they are optimally functional at different temperatures.

Mutualistic interactions can be evolutionarily unstable because of the constant battle to maximize one's self-benefits. This is due to the limited benefits offered to both the parasite and the host, with the possible outcome for at least one of the species to die out if the other species begins to take advantage of the other. In the case that the mutualistic behavior persists for enough generations, the dynamic can evolve into parasitism, which is a more stable dynamic due to the increased benefit to the parasite that propagates the behavior. In this case the parasite takes advantage of the previously mutualistic host and parasite dynamic, gaining greater benefits for itself.

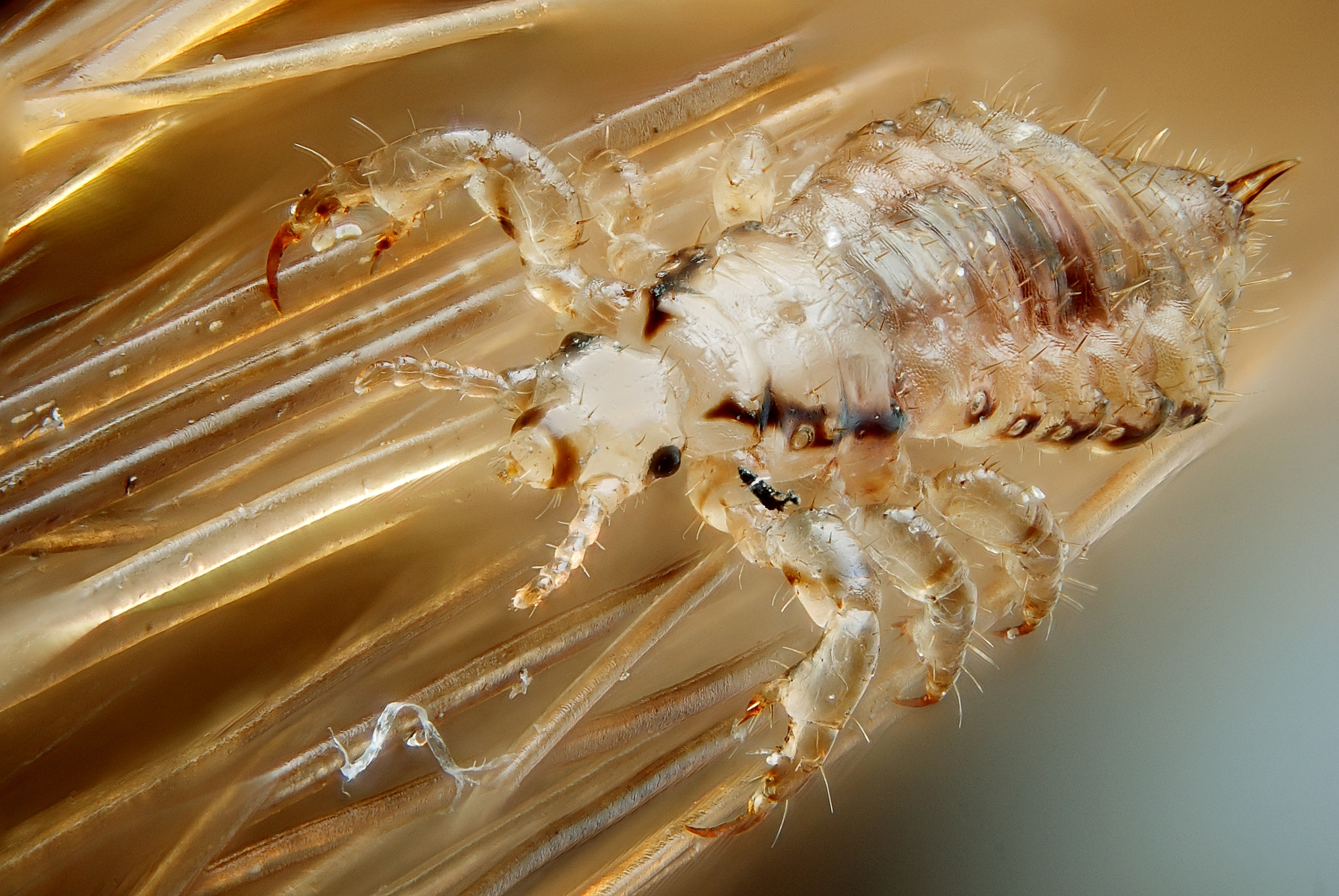
The head louse is an ectosymbiotic parasite that feeds off of the blood of humans by attaching itself to the scalp.

=== Parasitism ===
Parasitism is a form of symbiosis in which one species benefits from the interactions between species while the other organism is actively harmed. This is the most common form of ectosymbiotic interactions. One of the many examples of ectosymbiotic parasites includes head lice in humans, which feed on blood by attaching to a human's scalp. Additionally, mature Branchiobdellida bacteria act as a nutrient thief in the gut of crayfish species to exist. In these cases, the head lice and the Branchiobdellida are both parasites interacting with host species.

== See also ==
- Epibiosis
- Epixenosomes
