= Alluroididae =

Scientific classification
- Domain: Eukaryota
- Kingdom: Animalia
- Phylum: Annelida
- Clade: Pleistoannelida
- Clade: Sedentaria
- Class: Clitellata
- Order: Haplotaxida
- Family: Alluroididae

Family of annelids

Alluroididae is a family of annelids belonging to the order Haplotaxida.

Genera:

- Alluroides Beddard, 1894
- Barryjamiesonia Ljunström, 1971
- Brinkhurstia Jamieson, 1968
- Kathrynella Omodeo, 1996
- Righiella Omodeo & Coates, 2001
- Standeria Jamieson, 1968
