= Capilloventrida =

Scientific classification
- Domain: Eukaryota
- Kingdom: Animalia
- Phylum: Annelida
- Clade: Pleistoannelida
- Clade: Sedentaria
- Class: Clitellata
- Order: Capilloventrida

Order of annelid worms

Capilloventrida is an order of annelids belonging to the class Clitellata.

Families:

- Capilloventridae
