= Dorydrilidae =

Scientific classification
- Domain: Eukaryota
- Kingdom: Animalia
- Phylum: Annelida
- Clade: Pleistoannelida
- Clade: Sedentaria
- Class: Clitellata
- Order: Haplotaxida
- Family: Dorydrilidae

Family of annelid worms

Dorydrilidae is a family of annelids belonging to the order Haplotaxida.

Genera:

- Dorydrilus Piguet, 1913
