= Criodrilidae =

Scientific classification
- Kingdom: Animalia
- Phylum: Annelida
- Clade: Pleistoannelida
- Clade: Sedentaria
- Class: Clitellata
- Order: Haplotaxida
- Family: Criodrilidae; Vejdovský, 1884

Genus
- Criodrilus

Family of annelid worms

The family Criodrilidae is represented by genus Criodrilus comprising limicolous (mud-dwelling) and/or aquatic earthworms endemic to the Palaearctic currently known only from Europe and Japan, respectively. Only three or four species are described, and the type, Criodrilus lacuum, has been introduced into North and South Americas, and is found rarely in plant pots or paddy fields.

The Criodrilidae are characterised by holoic nephridia absent from anterior segments (cf. Pontodrilus), a simple gut with no gizzard and no typhlosole. They are true earthworms, having a complex vascular system with capillaries, the male pores (on 15 or 13) behind the female pores (on 14) and a multicelled clitellum. They were at one time placed in the earthworm families Glossoscolecidae or Almidae, but at present are considered to constitute their own family.

Criodrilidae species (criodrilids) are found in mud next to lakes and waterways (cf. North American Sparganophilus). They feed in the low-oxygen mud and organic material, but with their highly vascularized posterior region on or near the surface.

Criodrilus has no accepted common name; Criodrilus bathybates is the Lake Biwa earthworm.

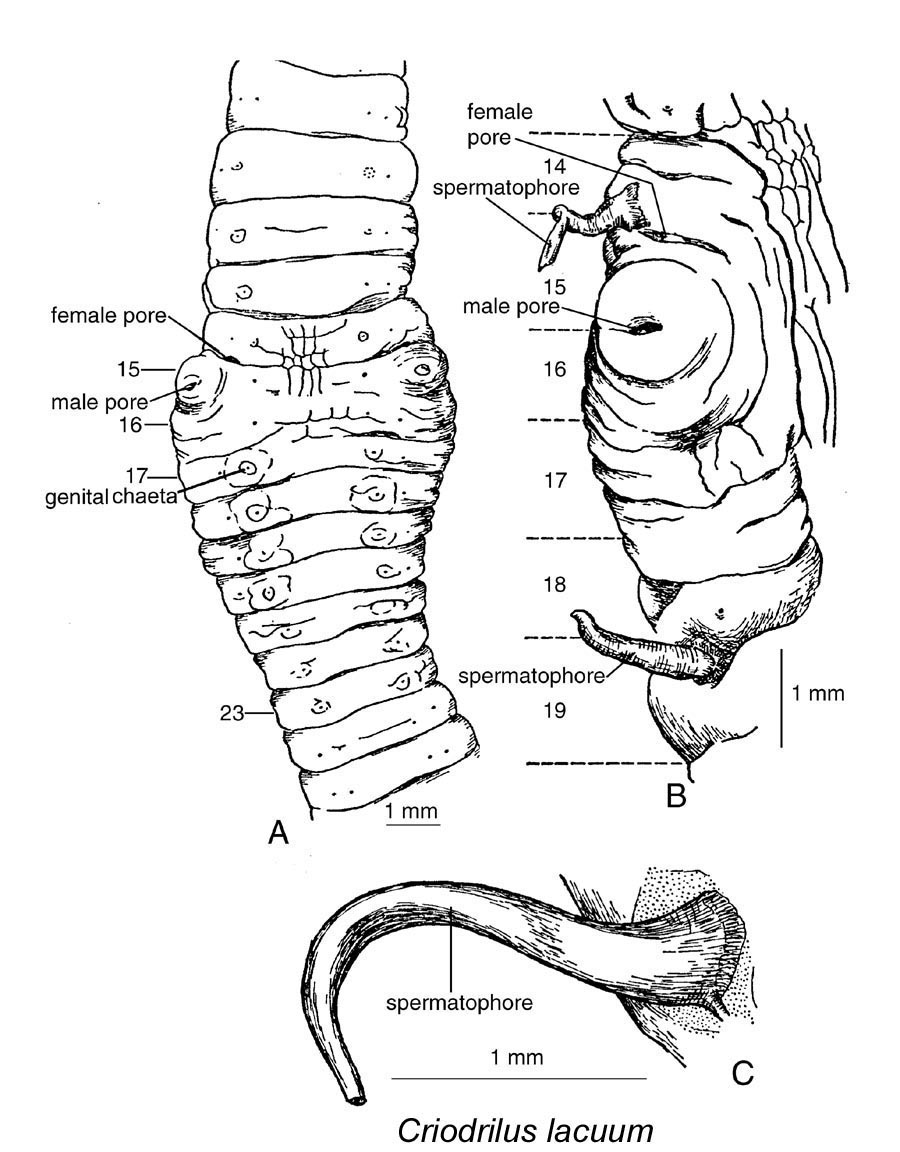
The hard, hornlike spermatophore of Criodrilus laccum
