= Hormogastridae =

Scientific classification
- Domain: Eukaryota
- Kingdom: Animalia
- Phylum: Annelida
- Clade: Pleistoannelida
- Clade: Sedentaria
- Class: Clitellata
- Order: Haplotaxida
- Family: Hormogastridae

Family of annelid worms

Hormogastridae is a family of annelids belonging to the order Haplotaxida.

== Genera ==
Genera:

- Ailoscolex Bouché, 1969
- Boucheona Marchán, Fernández, Díaz Cosín & Novo, 2018
- Hemigastrodrilus Bouché, 1970
- Hormogaster Rosa, 1887
- Vignysa Bouché, 1970
- Xana Cosin, Briones & Trigo, 1989
