= Eudrilidae =

Scientific classification
- Domain: Eukaryota
- Kingdom: Animalia
- Phylum: Annelida
- Clade: Pleistoannelida
- Clade: Sedentaria
- Class: Clitellata
- Order: Opisthopora
- Suborder: Lumbricina
- Family: Eudrilidae; Claus, 1880

Family of annelids

The Eudrilidae are a family of earthworms, mostly of Africa. One species, Eudrilus eugeniae (Kinberg, 1867), is widely distributed around the warmer parts of the world and historically cultured as the "African nightcrawler".

The male pores of eudrilids are in segment 17, as is also typical of Ocnerodrilidae. Eudrilids differ from the family Megascolecidae and Acanthodrilidae in having euprostates, i.e., a muscular and possibly glandular development of the vasa deferentia (male ducts from testes) that open to the male pores. Eudrilids further differ from megascolecids, and ocnerodrilids in the development of internal fertilisation with the equivalent of the spermathecae opening directly to the ovisacs, allowing sperm to combine with the eggs from the ovaries via a female opening in segment 14.
