= Ocnerodrilidae =

Scientific classification
- Kingdom: Animalia
- Phylum: Annelida
- Clade: Pleistoannelida
- Clade: Sedentaria
- Class: Clitellata
- Order: Haplotaxida
- Family: Ocnerodrilidae

Family of annelid worms

Ocnerodrilidae is a family of annelids belonging to the order Haplotaxida.

== Genera ==
Genera:

- Aphanascus Stephenson, 1924
- Arraia Hernandez-Garcia, Burgos-Guerrero, Rousseau & James, 2018
- Bauba Righi, 1980
