= Randiella =

Scientific classification
- Kingdom: Animalia
- Phylum: Annelida
- Clade: Pleistoannelida
- Clade: Sedentaria
- Class: Clitellata
- Order: Randiellida; Jamieson, 1988
- Family: Randiellidae; Erséus & Strehlow, 1986
- Genus: Randiella; Erséus & Strehlow, 1986

Genus of annelid worms

Randiella is a genus of annelid worms. It is the only member of the monogeneric family Randiellidae, which is itself the only member of the monotypic order Randiellida. It contains four species.

== Species ==
Randiella contains the following species:

- Randiella caribaea Erséus & Strehlow, 1986
- Randiella litoralis Erséus & Strehlow, 1986
- Randiella minuta Erséus & Strehlow, 1986
- Randiella multitheca Erséus & Strehlow, 1986
