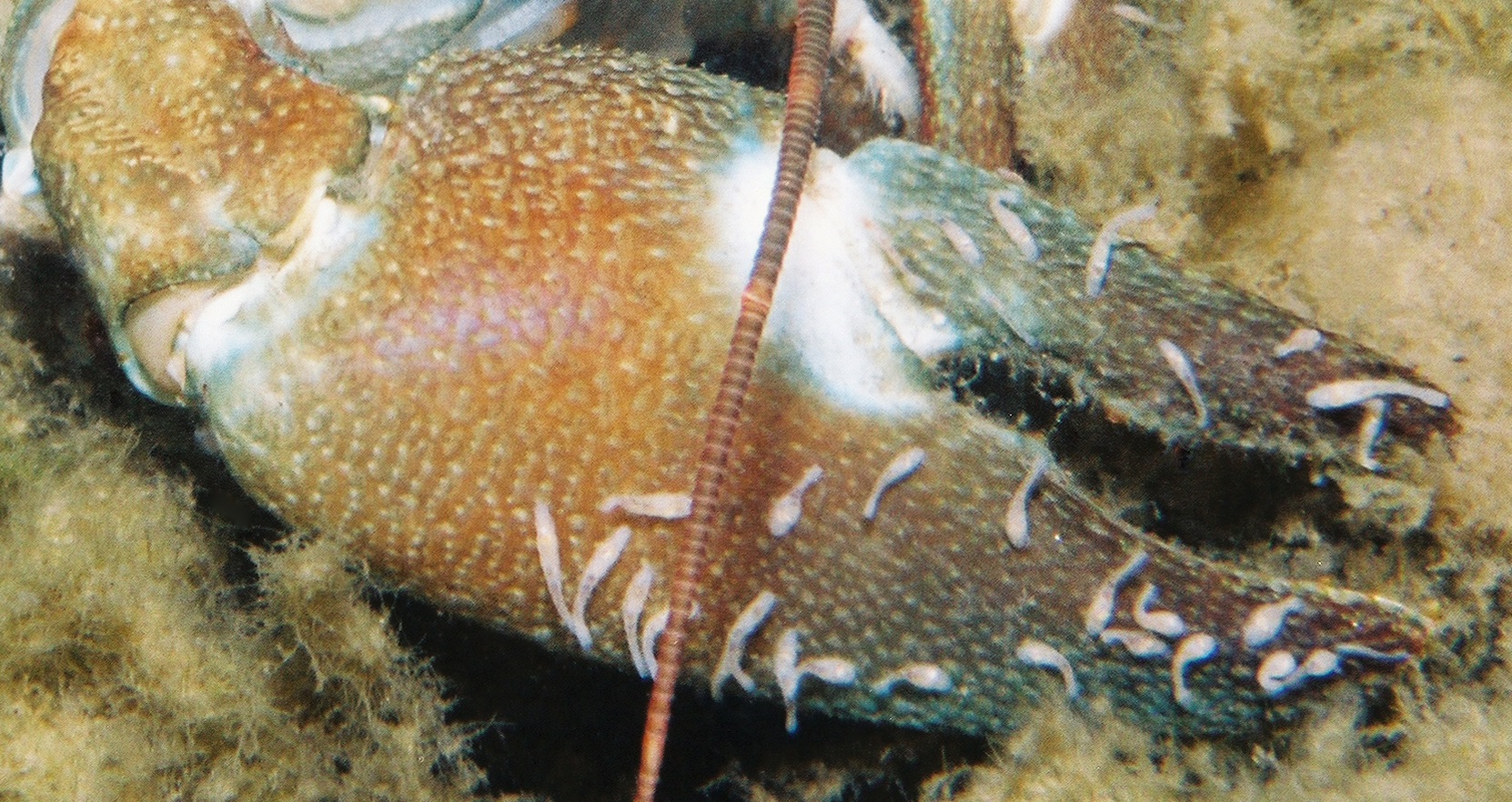
- Branchiobdellids on the claw of a signal crayfish

Scientific classification
- Kingdom: Animalia
- Phylum: Annelida
- Clade: Pleistoannelida
- Clade: Sedentaria
- Class: Clitellata
- Order: Branchiobdellida

= Branchiobdellida =

Order of annelids

Branchiobdellida is an order of freshwater leech-like clitellates that are obligate ectosymbionts or ectoparasites, mostly of astacoidean crayfish. They are found in the Northern Hemisphere and have a holarctic distribution in East Asia, the Euro-Mediterranean region and North and Central America, with the greatest species diversity being in North and Central America.

== Taxonomy ==
The exact relationship of this group of clitellates with other groups has been the subject of debate for a century or more. The American zoologist Perry C. Holt wrote his doctoral thesis on branchiobdellids and devoted his 45 years of research to the taxon. With his colleague, the American zoologist Richard L. Hoffman, he described 8 new genera and 75 new species, and re-described various other species. In 1965, he came to the conclusion that the group should be raised from a family to an order, as a sister group to the oligochaetes and leeches.

Forty years later, molecular data from rDNA and mitochondrial DNA studies has shown that he was correct, and that Oligochaeta, Branchiobdellida, Acanthobdellida and Hirudinea form a monophyletic group and that each should be considered an order. Branchiobdellida is now acknowledged to be sister to leeches and acanthobdellidans. The order is monotypic and contains only one family, the Branchiobdellidae.

== Description ==
Branchiobdellida vary in length between 1 mm (0.04 in) and 10 mm (0.4 in). The body is formed from fifteen segments. There is no prostomium, and the peristomium and next three segments are modified into a sucker, surrounded by small tentacles, with the mouth at its centre. The buccal cavity has a single dorsal and a single ventral tooth. Segment 14 has the anus on its dorsal surface, and segment 15 forms a sucker.

== Diversity ==
The majority of branchiobdellida use crayfish as hosts, usually living on their heads, carapaces and chelae (claws), but in some instances living inside their gill cavities. In East Asia, some species live on freshwater shrimp, and in Northern and Central America, freshwater crabs, shrimps and isopods host branchiobdellids, and some have even been found on Chesapeake blue crabs. In the Euro/Mediterranean region, however, crayfish are exclusively used as hosts. Some branchiobdellids are generalists, but a few are limited to association with a single host species. Several different species of branchiobdellid are sometimes found on a single crayfish. Their hosts include open-water crustaceans, cave-dwellers and burrowers, but many branchiobdellida have a very limited range, occurring in a single river system or a single cave. An Appalachian brook crayfish was found to have one species of branchiobdellid in the gill chambers, one on the oral and ventral surfaces of the body and one on the chelae.

== Ecology ==
Branchiobdellida feed on the micro-organisms and detritus that accumulate on their host; they will also feed on any soft tissues exposed where the host's exoskeleton is damaged. The relationship is generally symbiotic in that the host benefits from the cleaning activities of the branchiobdellids, and the latter benefit from a constant supply of food and a surface on which to deposit their cocoons; the worms have been maintained for months in the laboratory in the absence of a host, but the cocoons must be attached to a living host in order for normal development of the embryos to occur.
