= Phreodrilidae =

Scientific classification
- Kingdom: Animalia
- Phylum: Annelida
- Clade: Pleistoannelida
- Clade: Sedentaria
- Class: Clitellata
- Order: Haplotaxida
- Family: Phreodrilidae

Family of annelid worms

Phreodrilidae is a family of annelids belonging to the order Haplotaxida.

== Genera ==
Genera:

- Antarctodrilus Brinkhurst, 1965
- Astacopsidrilus Goddard, 1909
