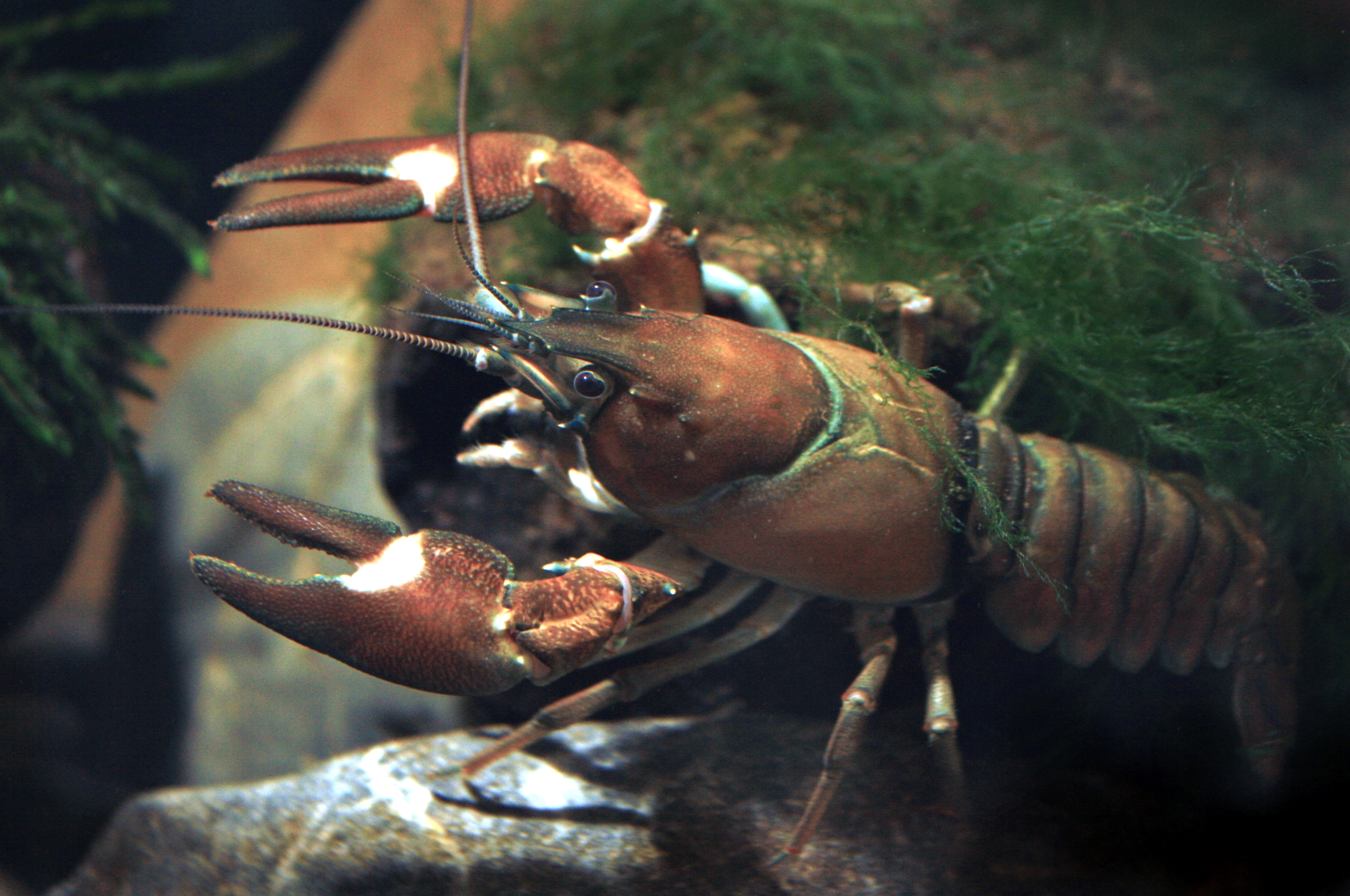

Conservation status
- Least Concern (IUCN 3.1)

Scientific classification
- Kingdom: Animalia
- Phylum: Arthropoda
- Clade: Pancrustacea
- Class: Malacostraca
- Order: Decapoda
- Suborder: Pleocyemata
- Family: Astacidae
- Genus: Pacifastacus
- Species: P. leniusculus

Binomial name
- Pacifastacus leniusculus (Dana, 1852)

= Signal crayfish =

Pacifastacus leniusculus

Species of crustacean

Pacifastacus leniusculus, commonly known as the signal crayfish, is a species of freshwater crayfish in the family Astacidae, native to western North America. They are thought to have originated from the Columbia River Basin.

Physically, they are characterized by a smooth carapace and a distinctive white to pale blue-green patch at the base of the claw joint. Reminiscent of the white flags that signalmen used for directing trains, this light patch is responsible for the species' common name. Due to its heightened aggression and opportunistic polytrophic diet,P. leniusculus has become an established invasive species found across North America, Europe, and Japan, displacing many of the regions’ native species.

During the twentieth century, P. leniusculus was intentionally introduced to many regions of Europe to replace declining populations of the native Astacus astacus, which had been affected by outbreaks of crayfish plague. At the time of introduction, it was not widely known that North American crayfish species, including P. leniusculus, commonly act as asymptomatic carriers. As a result, P. leniusculus facilitated the continued spread of crayfish plague across European freshwater ecosystems, continuing to decimate native crayfish.

== Description ==
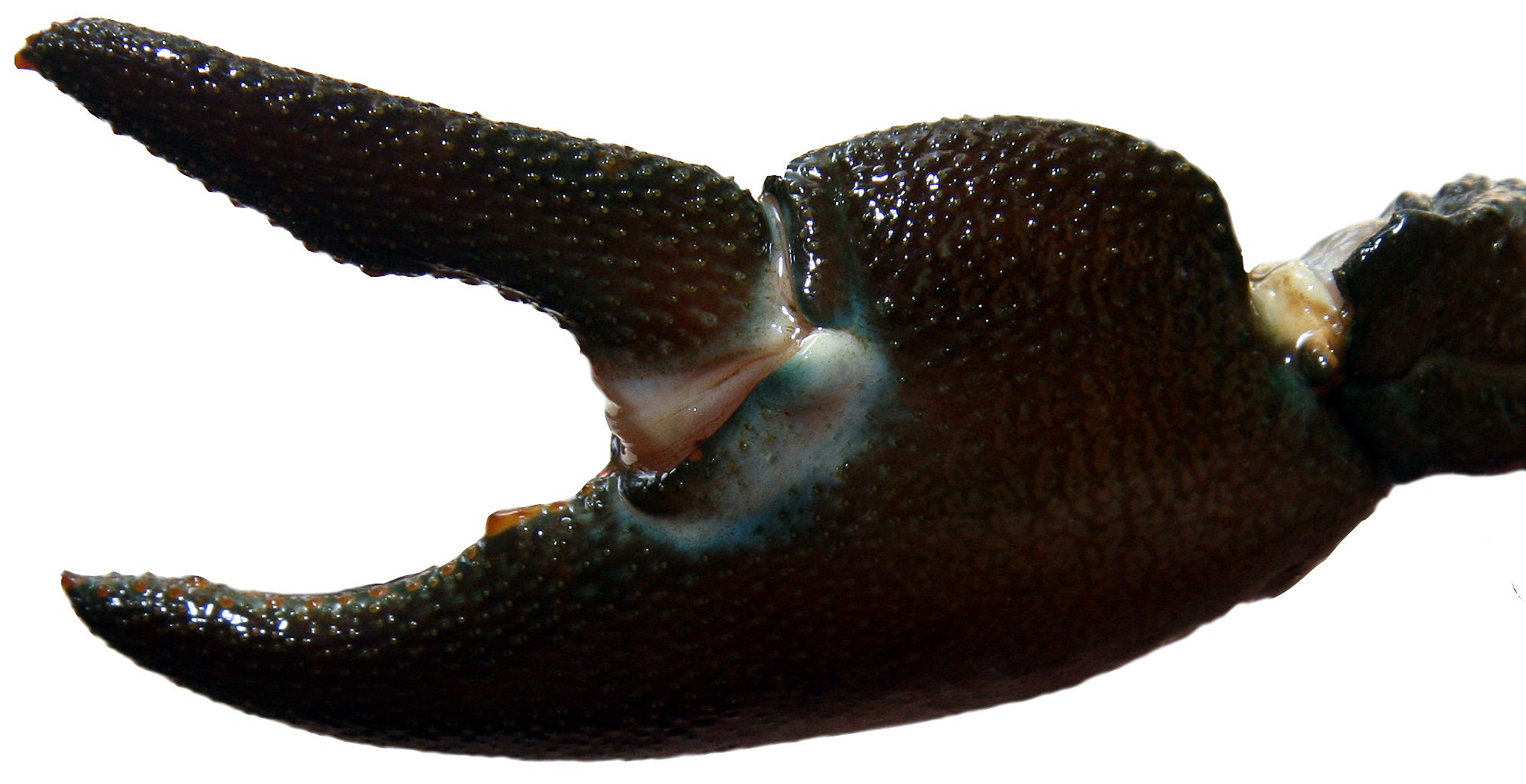
A white oval patch at the joint of the fingers of the claw distinguishes this species.

Members of this species are typically 6–9 cm (2.4–3.5 in) long, although sizes up to 16–20 cm (6–8 in) are possible. They typically weigh 60 g and 110 g at carapace lengths of 50 mm and 70 mm, respectively. Their dorsal surface is typically brown, but can range from bright red to blue. A distinctive white to pale blue-green patch is present near the claw hinge. The surface of the carapace and claws are smooth. P. leniusculus can often be confused with the noble crayfish (Astacus astacus), but lacks a row of spines on the shoulders of the carapace to distinguish them.

== Geographic range ==
P. leniusculus is thought to be endemic to the Columbia River Basin in North America, which includes the Canadian province of British Columbia and U.S. states Washington, Oregon, and Idaho. However, substantial cryptic diversity exists, with morphology-based taxonomy and molecular evidence suggesting that three groups are highly distinctive from P. leniusculus in discrete geographic regions: the Chehalis River glacial refugium, central Oregon and the Okanagan Plateau. First introduced to the San Lorenzo River watershed in California in 1912, P. leniusculus has since spread through the state. The only native crayfish remaining in California (aside from Pacifastacus leniusculus klamathensis, a subspecies of P. leniusculus believed to be native to the Klamath River in Northern California) is the Shasta crayfish, of Shasta County, California (Pacifastacus fortis). Efforts are being made to create a barrier to signal crayfish invasion in this region. Within North America, it has also been introduced to Nevada, and the populations in Utah may be the result of introductions. It has also been found in Alaska, specifically Kodiak Island, in the Buskin River and Buskin Lake. It is listed as a species of least concern on the IUCN Red List.

P. leniusculus was first introduced to Europe in 1960 and have spread across the continent since, both intentionally and not. As of 2009, they can now be found in 27 European countries and regions, making it the most widespread invasive freshwater crayfish species in Europe.

== Invasiveness ==
=== Introduction into Europe ===
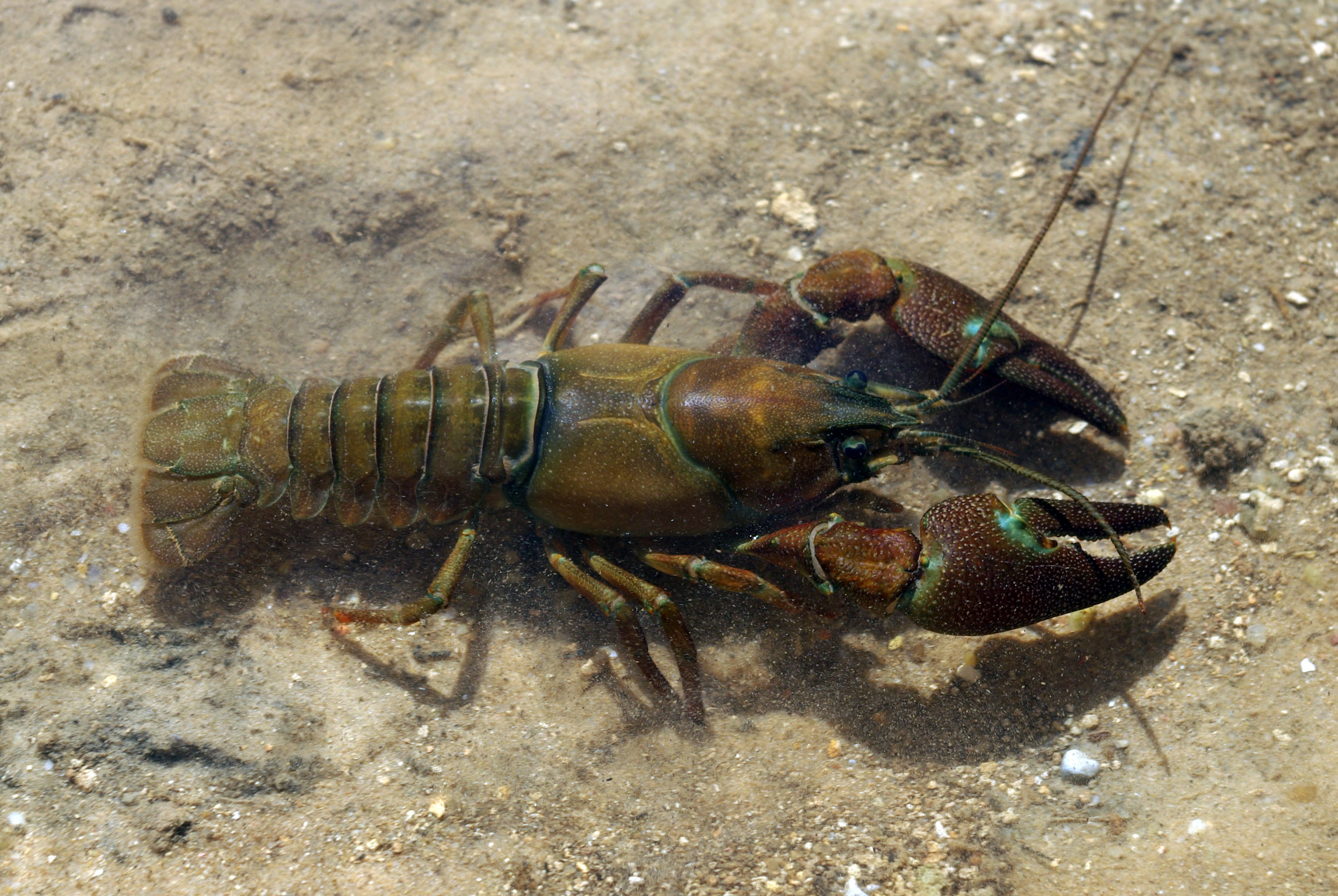
A signal crayfish in Spain

From 1907 on, crayfish plague, an infectious disease caused by the water mold Aphanomyces astaci, has decreased populations of the native noble crayfish (Astacus astacus) across Europe. Since P. leniusculus was thought to occupy a similar ecological and gastronomical niche, it was intentionally introduced to Sweden and Finland in the 1960s for recreational and commercial reasons. At the time, it was unknown that all American crayfish, including P. leniusculus, can carry crayfish plague. But while most American crayfish have some immunity, the infection is fatal for European species. Consequently, P. leniusculus has continued to spread and outcompete native crayfish.

The signal crayfish is now the most widespread alien crayfish in Europe, residing in 27 countries, from Finland to Great Britain and from Spain to Greece. It was first introduced to Great Britain in 1976, and is now widespread across the British mainland as far north as the Moray Firth. It has also been observed on the Isle of Man, but not in Ireland, the last European country to have no alien crayfish.

In both Sweden and Finland, where crayfish are eaten, the catch of signal crayfish exceeds that of A. astacus (European/noble crayfish). The former is sold at roughly half the price compared to the latter.

Multiple studies have been published to identify effective mitigation strategies for the detrimental impact of the settlement — and subsequent overpopulation — of invasive signal crayfish in Europe. This includes studies regarding effective upstream barriers against signal crayfish that do not adversely affect fish migration, as well as other, aggressive but more efficient approaches which may cause further harm to existing ecosystems, such as eradication (by means of drainage or destruction of waterways, and biocides) and suppression (by means of extensive trapping, electrocution of waterways, and introduction of predatory fish), with eradication being most successful.

=== Invasiveness and European range ===
The success of P. leniusculus is often attributed to the Enemy Release Hypothesis, where they escape approximately 75% of their native parasites and predators when entering a new range. They also display higher aggression than other established invasive spiny cheek crayfish (Faxonius limosus). This may factor into their success and fitness against native species, allowing for P. leniusculus to have rapid range expansion.

In Europe, P. leniusculus has been included in the list of Invasive Alien Species of Union concern (the Union list) since 2016. This implies that this species cannot be imported, bred, transported, commercialized, or intentionally released into the environment in the whole of the European Union. The signal crayfish is often considered a nuisance species amongst anglers in Europe.

In the Iberian Peninsula, invasive P. leniusculus have been recorded to significantly impact native fish communities. On average, native fish were observed to dominate in only 4% of encounters with adult P. leniusculus compared to 25% with juveniles. In particular, the Pyrenean stone loach (Barbatula quignardi) dominated 50% of juvenile encounters, but exhibits an evasion response greater than 30% in adult encounters.

A case study of Rabaçal and Tuela River basins of northeast Portugal revealed that the presence of P. leniusculus had nearly negligible effects on overall native fish abundance, biomass, or species richness. However, more nuanced species interactions were observed. In P. leniusculus invaded sites, there was a significant decrease in Iberian chub (Squalius carolitertii) populations and brown trout (Salmo trutta) physiological conditions.

== Habitat ==
P. leniusculus typically lives in a variety of streams, rivers, and wetlands. The species is environmentally tolerant but does not occur in waters with a pH lower than 6.0. While categorized as a non-burrowing crayfish, they are known to sometimes construct shallow burrows in crevices or with debris.

== Behavior ==
P. leniusculus are primarily nocturnal, conducting most of their activity at night. In a 12:12 light-dark cycle, an average of 72% of their activity occurred during dark hours. Research has shown that they have a circadian rhythm with distinct chronotypes, consistent and repeatable activity patterns, during early and middle night. Late-night behavior is far more variable and unpredictable. This is hypothesized to be driven by predator avoidance as a potential evolutionary strategy.

P. leniusculus display heighten aggressive behaviors compared to other freshwater crayfish. In interactions with the invasive spiny cheek crayfish (Faxionus limosus), P. leniusculus established dominance consistently. P. leniusculus had a greater tendency to engage and maintain high-intensity fight. F. limosus conversely retreated at a lower fight intensity. These behavioral trends in P. leniusculus may in part explain their success as an invasive species.

P. leniusculus exhibits great individual variation in risk-taking behavior. Except in a directly food-motivated context, individuals were not found to display any repeatability or consistency in risk-taking. Consequently, boldness within individual P. leniusculus is likely a context-dependent rather than a stable or distinct personality trait. However, there was a correlation found between activity timing, specifically late-night activity, and risk-taking. This may speak to an acceptance of increased predatory risks for some P. leniusculus to better exploit feeding opportunities, though still theoretical.

In behavioral assays, P. leniusculus displayed edge tracking, often called wall-hugging or thigmotactic behavior. This is a conserved response to novel environments also documented in rodents, fish, other crustaceans, and amphipods.

Exposure to different semiochemicals, communicatory or informative chemical signals, drastically influences P. leniusculus behavior. Exposure to haemolymph, an alarm cue that elicits strong anti-predator responses, triggered heightened activity. Compared to responses to food odors, P. leniusculus exhibited significantly more movement in distance traveled at a faster swimming velocity. Though able to locate food odor sources more accurately, P. leniusculus often remained within the vicinity of haemolymph sources for longer once detected. This behavior suggests that P. leniusculus may remain within proximity to the alarm cue to gain more information on the potential threat while staying out of direct contact and danger.

== Life history ==
P. leniusculus follows a similar breeding and lifecycle to most temperate crayfish in the family Astacidae. Their mating period occurs in the fall, spanning from September to October. Females will carry their clutch of eggs through the winter until the temperature warms and they can hatch, typically in March to April. Upon hatching, the juveniles undergo three stages of development, passing through two molting stages before leaving their mother. Populations of P. leniusculus in cooler climates may hatch later, as their growth is temperature-dependent. As such, individuals in cooler climates may mature more slowly.

== Ecology ==
The signal crayfish is an opportunistic omnivore, with a diet primarily consisting of detritus. Adults can adapt to a broad range of salinity, substrate types and the presence of aquatic vegetation.

== Parasites and diseases ==
A known parasite of P. leniusculus is the common crayfish ecto-symbiont, Xironogiton victoriensis, which is also native to North America. In experimental assays, P. leniusculus infected by X. victoriensis displayed significantly fewer fighting and threat behaviors, and more retreat and avoidance behaviors. In addition to reduced aggression, infected individuals were poorer foragers with decreased prey consumption. However, overall growth rates and survivorship were not significantly affected. This can be largely attributed to an experimental laboratory setting, where decreased fitness effects can be expected in natural environments.

P. leniusculus is a known transmitter of the water mold Aphanomyces astaci, the cause of crayfish plague. As with most North American crayfish, P. leniusculus is largely resistant to the plague except under extreme stress. Thus, they act as asymptomatic carriers that can transmit crayfish plague to highly susceptible European crayfish species, leading to mass mortality. This competitive advantage of P. leniusculus has contributed to its invasive success by causing the population decline of native crayfish.

P. leniusculus is also susceptible to white spot syndrome virus (WSSV). This has been found experimentally, where injecting WSSV into different tissues in the signal crayfish resulted in positive WSSV gene probe results, changes in the proportions of different haemocytes, and symptoms similar to those of WSSV-infected shrimp. However, no white spots or red body color were observed, which are typical symptoms.

== Taxonomy and subspecies ==
P. leniusculus is divided into three subspecies: leniusculus, klamathensis, and trowbridgii. Due to highly dissimilar morphology, they were originally identified as separate species. In 1960, Miller was the first to describe them as subspecies and later genetic studies have since confirmed this relationship, with P. l. klamathensis being more diverged than P. l. leniusculus and P. l. trowbridgii.

It was previously described that these subspecies of P. leniusculus were geographically isolated. However, early introductions and a lack of historical records complicate the delineation of any formal native ranges or potential overlaps. P. l. leniusculus and P. l. trowbridgii are thought to be indigenous to the lower Columbian River Basin and its tribunaries, potentially diverging due to stream capture. P. l. klamathensis is thought to be indigenous to the Klamath River. It was previously described that these subspecies of P. leniusculus were geographically isolated. However, early introductions and a lack of historical records complicate the delineation of any formal native ranges or potential overlaps.

P. l. leniusculus possesses sharp spines on its post-orbital ridge and a narrower carapace. Comparatively, P. l. trowbridgii possess rounder tubercles and a wider carapace. P. l. klamathensis have smaller tubercles on its post orbital ridge, a greater rostrum width to acumen length ratio, and often lack the distinctive pale “flag” mark on its chelae.

== Chemosensory system ==
As with most aquatic organisms, P. leniusculus rely heavily on chemosensory reception for communication, navigation, and foraging. They are particularly sensitive to hydrodynamic indicators and are fine-tuned to adapt to turbulence, displaying more accurate foraging in environments with rougher beds. P. leniusculus has been recorded to display greater foraging accuracy and velocity in arenas with more obstacles, mimicking natural environmental vegetation or substrate heterogeneity. The induced turbulence and higher flow complexity appear to enhance their exploration and overall locomotory activity. The adeptness of P. leniusculus in a turbulent environment may contribute to its invasive success.

P. leniusculus were found to be more accurate at locating a food source than haemolymph, an alarm cue, in experimental settings. On average, individuals located food more frequently in less time. However, this may be because food is a direct attractant while haemolymph may act as a potential stressor, leading to a lower success rate.

== Interactions with humans ==
Pesticides in runoff continue to pose a problem for many aquatic ecosystems, including that of the P. leniusculus. Three of the most relevant pesticides affecting P. leniusculus are metazachlor (MTZ), terbuthylazine (TER), and thiacloprid (TCL). When exposed to MTZ, P. leniusculus exhibited a rapid increase in heart rate and induced movement. However, TER and TCL did not induce any significant differences in heart rate or movement. In experimental trials, a majority of exposed individuals did not exhibit any detectable response within the 10-minute period. No long-term physiological effects of the pesticides on P. leniusculus are known. As such, P. leniusculus are especially vulnerable to TER and TCL, as a lack of response may lead to prolonged exposure.
