= Moniligastridae =

Scientific classification
- Domain: Eukaryota
- Kingdom: Animalia
- Phylum: Annelida
- Clade: Pleistoannelida
- Clade: Sedentaria
- Class: Clitellata
- Subclass: Oligochaeta
- Order: Moniligastrida
- Family: Moniligastridae; Claus, 1880

Genera
- Desmogaster; Drawida; Eupolygaster; Hastirogaster; Moniligaster

Family of annelids

Moniligastridae is a family of earthworms native to South and Eastern Asia, containing around 200 species and five genera.

== Genera ==
- Desmogaster Rosa, 1890
- Drawida Michaelsen, 1900
- Eupolygaster Michaelsen, 1900
- Hastirogaster Gates, 1930
- Moniligaster Perrier, 1872
