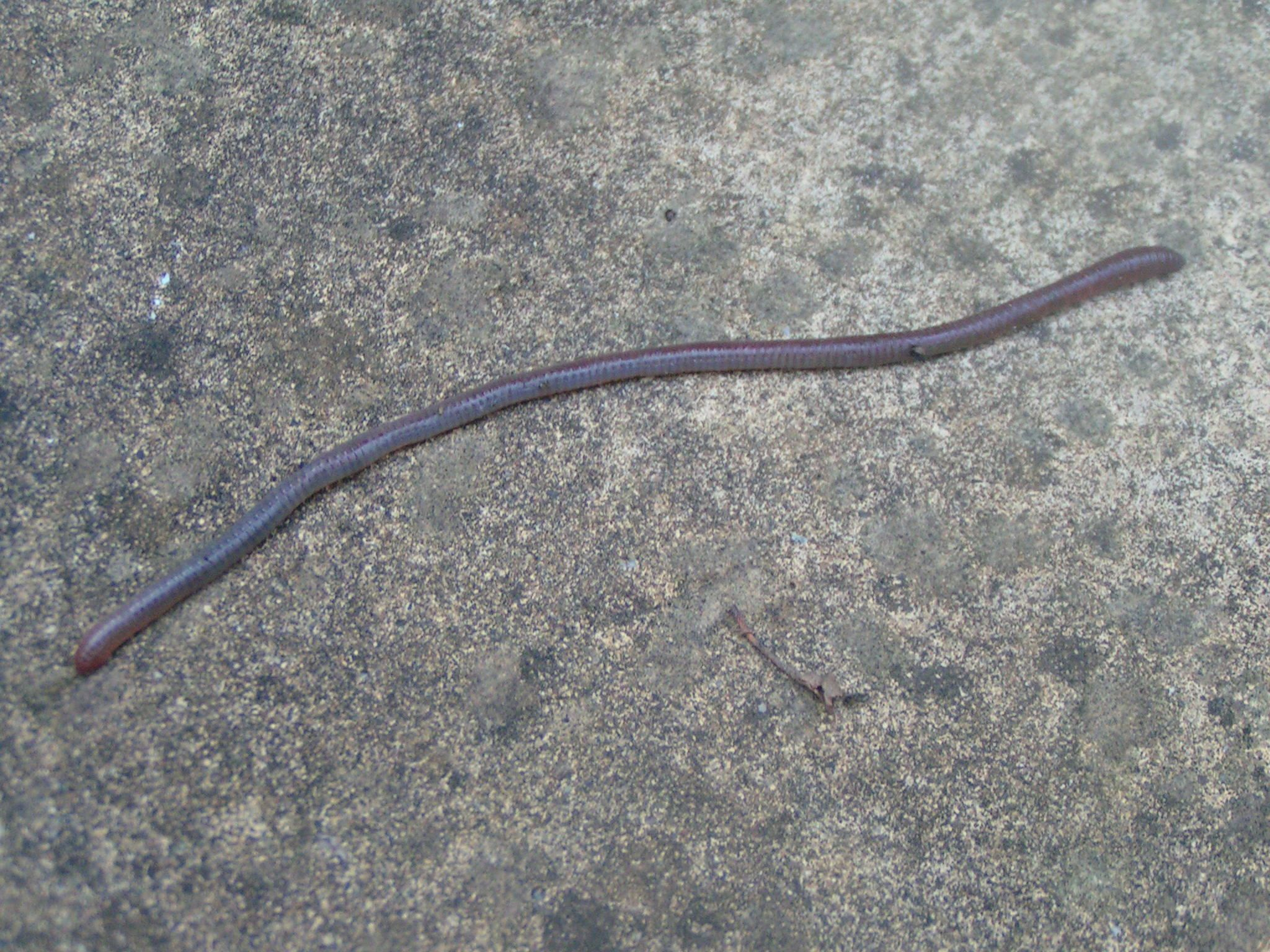
- Helodrilus caliginosus (Lumbricina: Lumbricidae)

Scientific classification
- Kingdom: Animalia
- Phylum: Annelida
- Clade: Pleistoannelida
- Clade: Sedentaria
- Class: Clitellata
- Order: Haplotaxida

Suborders
- Haplotaxina; Lumbricina; Moniligastrina; Tubificina

= Haplotaxida =

Order of annelids

The Haplotaxida are one of two orders within the annelid subclass Oligochaeta, the other being the Lumbriculida. No real common name exists, but they are simply referred to as haplotaxids.

Given that the other clitellatan annelids are embedded between and around the Haplotaxida and Lumbriculida, the traditional Oligochaeta are a paraphyletic assemblage. Thus, the Haplotaxida might eventually be up-ranked to subclass status within the Clitellata or an expanded Oligochaeta, with the present suborders advancing to order rank. The latter – though without merging the Oligochaeta and Clitellata – has been proposed time and again in the past, most prominently for the distinct Moniligastrina.

== Families ==
Of the four suborders of Haplotaxida, two are minor lineages, monotypic at family level. Another one, the Tubificina, is sizeable and contains the aquatic worms, while the fourth, the earthworms or Lumbricina, unites the bulk of the order's families:

Suborder Haplotaxina

- Haplotaxidae

Suborder Moniligastrina

- Moniligastridae

Suborder Lumbricina

- Alluroididae
- Eudrilidae
- Glossoscolecidae
- Lumbricidae
- Hormogastridae
- Ailoscolidae
- Lutodrilidae
- Sparganophilidae
- Criodrilidae
- Ocnerodrilidae
- Acanthodrilidae
- Octochaetidae
- Exxidae
- Megascolecidae
- Microchaetidae

Suborder Tubificina

- Dorydrilidae
- Enchytraeidae
- Naididae (including Tubificidae)
- Opistocystidae
- Phreodrilidae

== See also ==
- Haplotaxida topics
- Invertebrate orders
