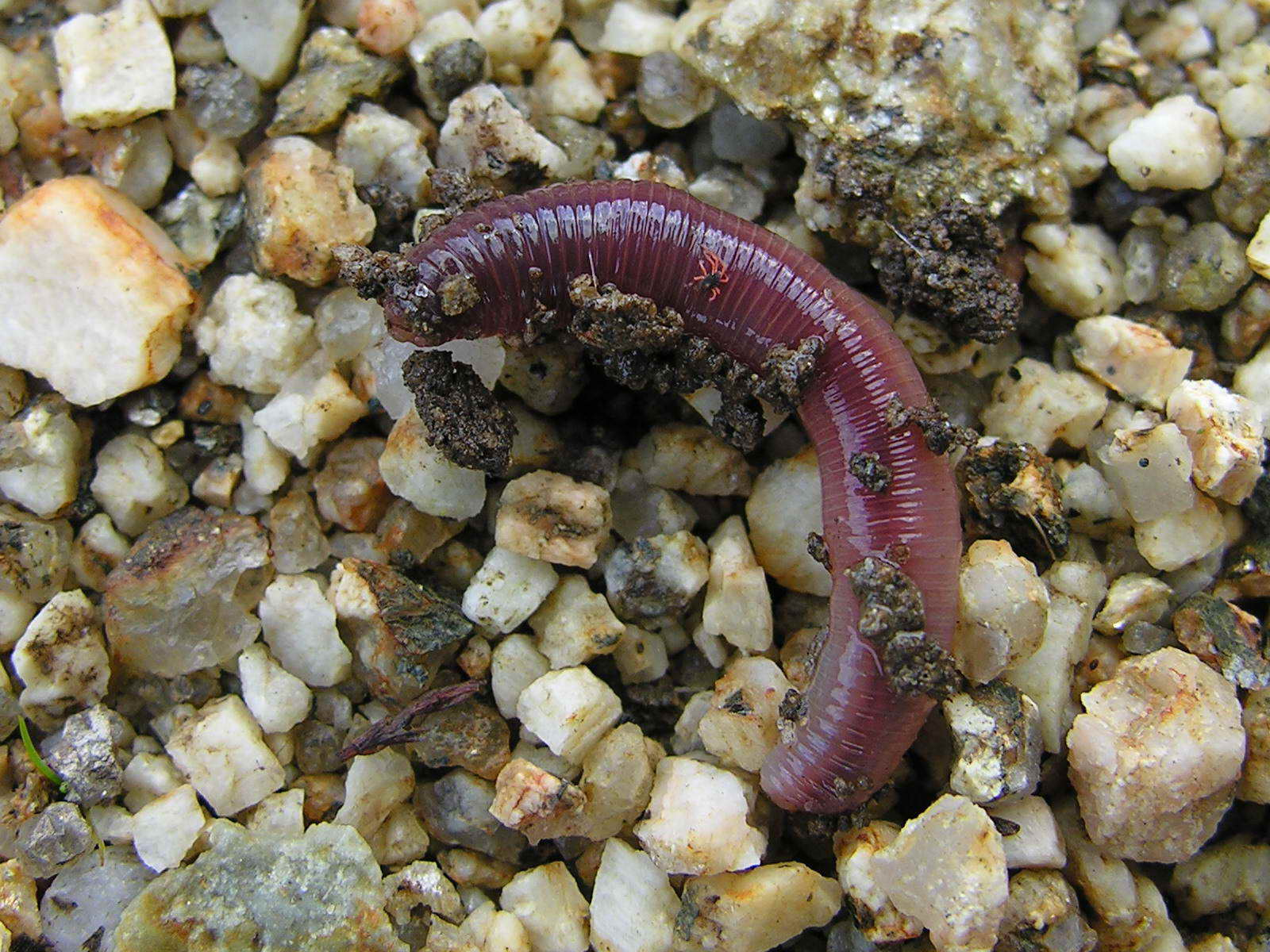
- Earthworm

Scientific classification
- Kingdom: Animalia
- Phylum: Annelida
- Clade: Pleistoannelida
- Clade: Sedentaria
- Class: Clitellata

Subclasses
- Phylogenetic: Hirudinida; Branchiobdellida; Crassiclitellata (incl. Lumbricus); Naididae; Lumbriculidae; Randiellidae; Parvidrilidae; Capilloventridae; Phreodrilidae; Propappidae; Enchytraeidae; Moniligastridae; Traditional Branchiobdellae; Hirudinea "Oligochaeta" (paraphyletic) and see text

= Clitellata =

Clitellata Temporal range: Telychian–Recent

Class of annelids that includes earthworms and leeches

The Clitellata are a class of annelid worms, characterized by having a clitellum – the 'collar' that forms a reproductive cocoon during part of their life cycles. The clitellates comprise around 8,000 species. Unlike the class of Polychaeta, they do not have parapodia and their heads are less developed.

== Etymology ==
Clitellata are named after a raised band around the head side of their body called the clitellum, a word related to other biological anatomy pertaining to raised bumps (see clitoris). All of these words stem from the Latin root for "incline," which over time came to represent the "litter" (bed and belongings) carried over the shoulder of soldiers and the "pack saddle" on top of domestic animals such as mules and horses for carrying people and goods.

== Characteristics ==
Clitellate annelids are segmented worms characterised by the clitellum or girdle which is located near the head end of mature individuals. The mouth is on the ventral surface and is overhung by the prostomium (proboscis). The brain is not located in the head but in one of the body segments. The clitellum is formed by a modification of several segments, and either includes the female gonopores or is located just behind them. During copulation, this glandular tissue secretes mucus that keeps the paired individuals together while they exchange sperm. Afterwards it secretes material that forms a cocoon that encircles the animal's body and encloses the eggs and sperm. The animal works this cocoon forward and over its head end, whereupon the ends of the cocoon become sealed, with fertilisation and development taking place inside.

Earthworms and their kin, in the subclass Oligochaeta, lack eyes but have photoreceptor cells in the skin, especially in the dorsal portion of the anterior end. They also lack parapodia and appendages on the prostomium, the body and the periproct (terminal segment on which the anus is located). The gonads are located in a few segments near the clitellum, with the testes being anterior to the ovaries. There are four bundles of one to twenty-five chaetae on each segment; these have muscles attached to their bases and can be extended or retracted.

Leeches, order Hirudinida, mostly have flattened bodies, usually tapered at both ends. They have a fixed number of segments, 33, but the segmentation is not visible externally because the cuticle is marked with annulations. Leeches do not bear chaetae. The front few segments or head have been modified into a sucker that usually surrounds the mouth. These segments usually bear several ocelli on the upper side. The clitellum occupies segments 9 to 11 but is only noticeable during breeding periods. The hindermost segments form another, larger, disc-shaped sucker located on the underside of the body. The anus is on the dorsal surface just in front of the posterior sucker. The body wall includes strong transverse, longitudinal and diagonal muscles which give the animal great flexibility and extensibility.

Genetic studies have shown the class' genome have gone through an extreme rearrangement, more than any other animals.

== Distribution and habitat ==
Clitellates live on land, in freshwater or in the ocean. The subclass Hirudinea (leeches) contains three orders with various habitat preferences. Branchiobdellida are commensal with freshwater crayfish, grazing algae from their exoskeletons. Acanthobdellida are parasitic on freshwater fishes such as grayling. Leeches can be found in nearly every part of the world, in freshwater, terrestrial, and marine habitats.

The subclass Oligochaeta, which includes the earthworms as the largest members of the group, mostly live on land, burrowing in damp soil. Smaller freshwater species burrow in mud or live among aquatic vegetation. The marine species are mostly tiny and live in the interstices between sand grains, from the intertidal zone to the deep sea.

== Reproduction ==
All clitellata are hermaphrodites. During copulation, the clitellum produces a mucus that holds worms in place whilst they mate. During reproduction, the clitellum secretes a yolk (albumen) and a proteinaceous sheath which hardens. The worm then creeps out backward from the coat and deposits either fertilized zygotes or both ova and sperm into the coat, which is then packed into a cocoon. The zygotes then develop directly in the cocoon without passing through a larval stage (as opposed to other annelids, e.g. Polychaeta.) This mechanism is considered to be apomorphic (a newly derived characteristic rather than an evolutionarily ancestral one).

== Systematics ==
According to modern phylogenetic analyses, the Clitellata are considered to be a monophyletic clade embedded deep in the polychaetes.

The group is divided into the subclasses Oligochaeta and Hirudinea. The oligochaetes contain the tubificids (Naididae, Lumbricidae, and Lumbriculidae) - commonly the tube worms and the earthworms. Hirudinea contains leeches (Euhirudinea), Acanthobdellida, and Branchiobdellida.

Hirudinea is monophyletic, but the clade is embedded among the Oligochaeta. Two approaches are possible:

- abolish Oligochaeta as traditionally delimited in favor of a number of smaller monophyletic lineages
- treat Oligochaeta and Clitellata as synonymous while splitting up the traditional "oligochaetes" into monophyletic lineages.

According to Erséus et al. (2020) the monophyletic clades are: Randiellidae, Parvidrilidae, Capilloventridae, Phreodrilidae, Naididae, Propappidae, Enchytraeidae, Lumbriculidae, Haplotaxidae (sensu stricto), Branchiobdellida, Acanthobdellida, Hirudinida, Moniligastridae, Delaya leruthi, Pelodrilus cf. darlingensis and Crassiclitellata.
