= April 1973 =

Month of 1973

<<	April 1973					>>
Su	Mo	Tu	We	Th	Fr	Sa
1	2	3	4	5	6	7
8	9	10	11	12	13	14
15	16	17	18	19	20	21
22	23	24	25	26	27	28
29	30

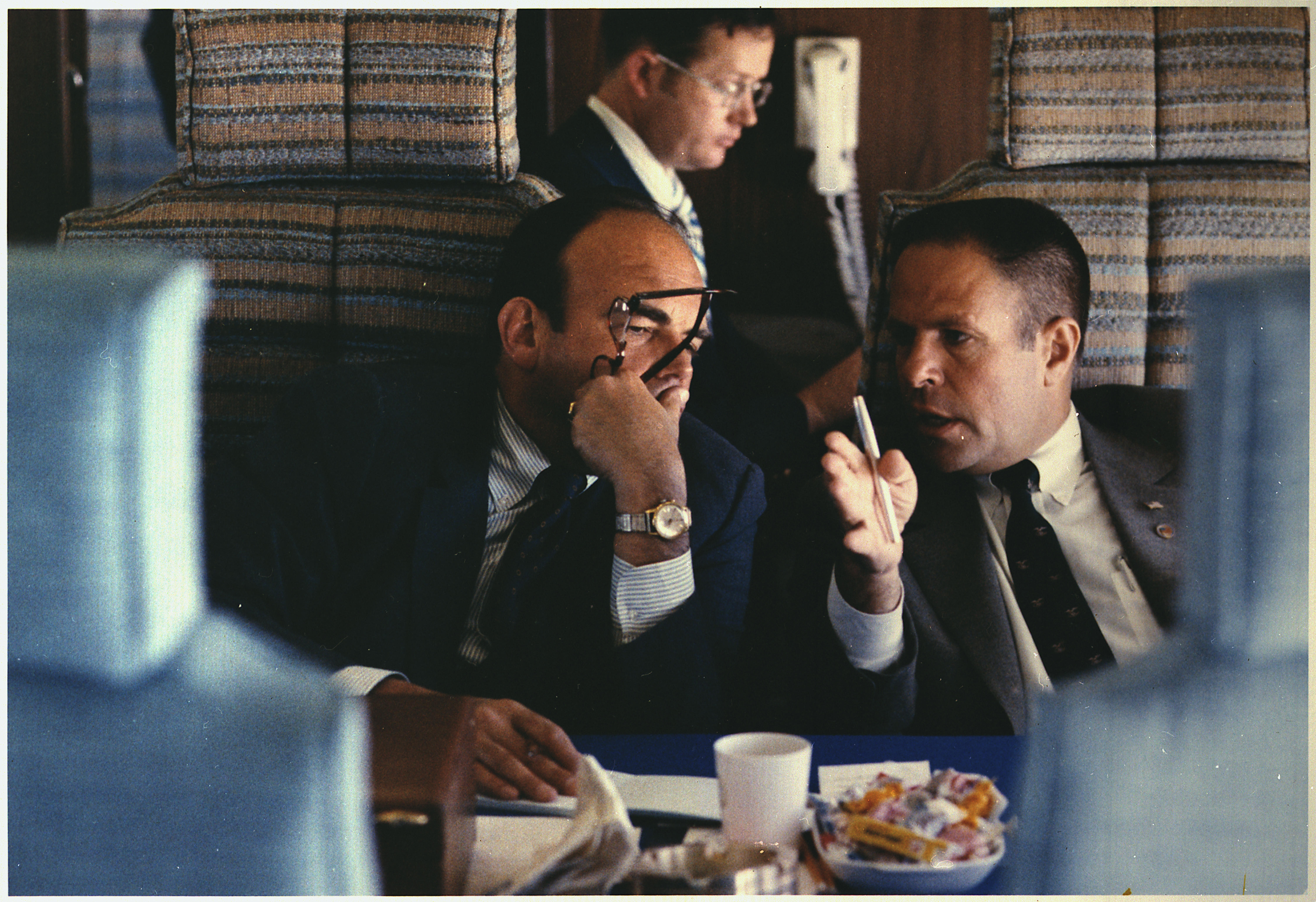
April 30, 1973: White House policy advisor John Ehrlichman and Chief of Staff H. R. Haldeman forced to resign after being implicated in Watergate

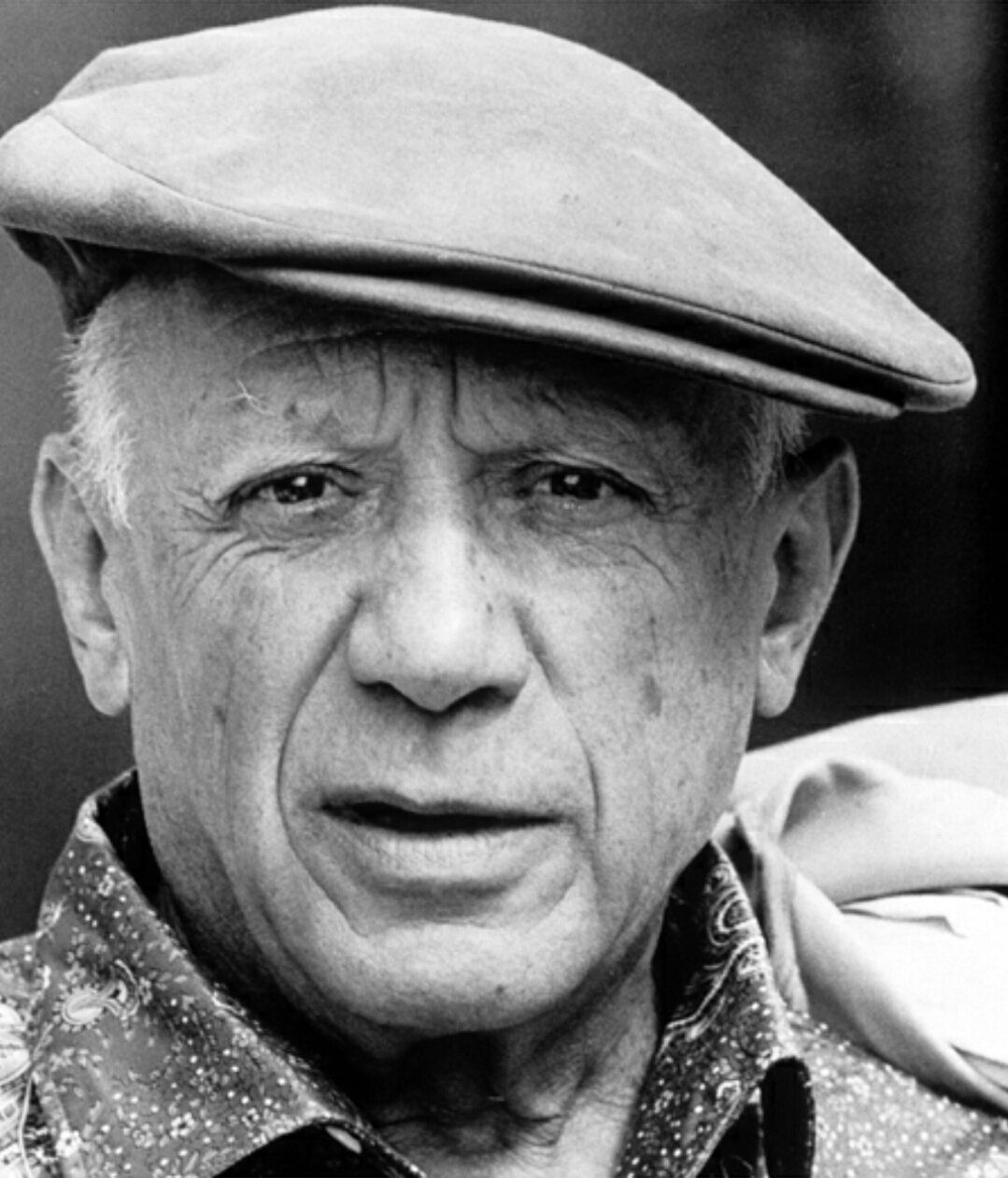
April 8, 1973: Pablo Picasso, "the most famous artist of his time", dies at the age of 91

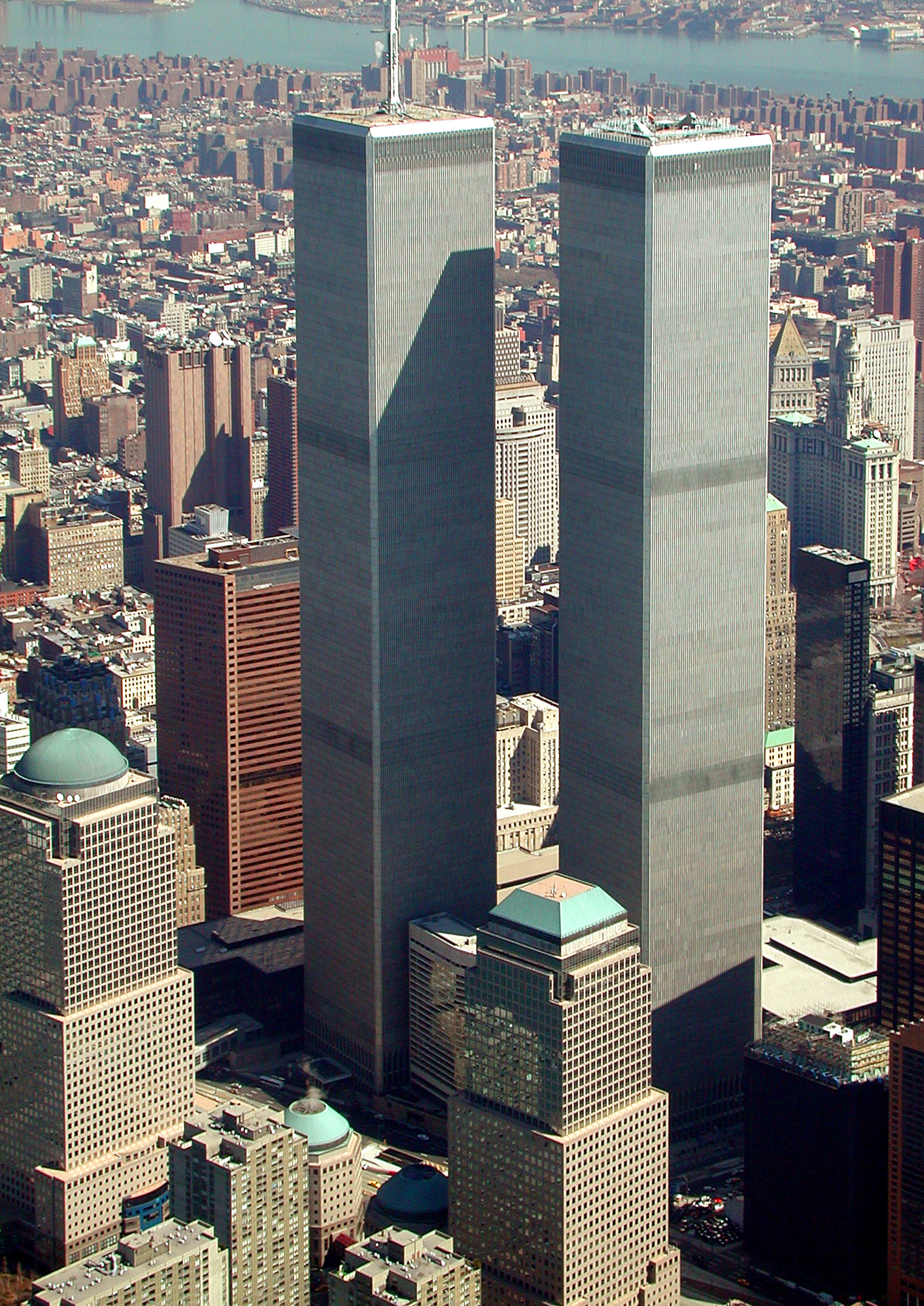
April 4, 1973: World Trade Center officially opens in New York City

The following events occurred in April 1973:

== April 1, 1973 (Sunday) ==
- VAT (Value Added Tax) went into effect in the UK. Described as "the most significant change in Britain's tax system since the war" the VAT replaced the purchase tax and the selective employment tax. A government advert told readers "VAT spreads taxation more evenly. Many prices stay ABOUT THE SAME, some go UP, and some come DOWN", and emphasized that the prices on food, household appliances, newspapers and toys would go down because of the elimination of purchase tax, while those for clothing and shoes, fabrics, furniture, and most services would go up.
- The government of India launched Project Tiger, a six-year campaign to save the tiger from extinction. Dr. Karan Singh, India's Minister of Tourism, announced the program, declaring Jim Corbett National Park and eight other protected areas as off limits to people. Only 1,800 tigers remained in India when the Project started, compared to 40,000 at the start of the 20th century.
- The U.S. Army Health Services Command was activated as part of a reorganization of the Army Medical Department, and took control of Army medical facilities in the continental United States.
- The first Doraemon anime began airing on Nippon TV in Japan.

== April 2, 1973 (Monday) ==
- In Northern Ireland, the Civil Authorities (Special Powers) Act was replaced by the Northern Ireland (Emergency Provisions) Act abolishing the death penalty for murder in Northern Ireland and establishing the Diplock courts.
- The Radio Veronica pirate radio ship was driven ashore at Scheveningen in a storm after her anchor chain snapped.
- The LexisNexis computerized legal research service began.

== April 3, 1973 (Tuesday) ==
- The first handheld cellular phone call was made by Martin Cooper in New York City, at a press conference held by the Motorola company to unveil its new "DYNA T-A-C radio-telephone" and announce its commitment to spend up to five million dollars to install transmission towers throughout the city. Cooper's call was made possible by the installation of temporary towers on two buildings on Fifth Avenue.
- The Soviet Union launched its second orbiting space station, Salyut 2. While the station went into Darth orbit, a cloud of fragments from an exploded rocket stage struck the station on April 15, tearing off both of its solar panels and rendering it without power to control its altitude. Salyut 2 would fall from orbit on May 28 and burn up in Earth's atmosphere.
- A group of 15,000 rebels began an uprising in the Kingdom of Sikkim, a semi-independent state within India, against the government of King Palden Thondup Namgyal. A group of protesters surrounded the royal palace to protest the composition of the Sikkim Council, and Crown Prince Tenzing and police fired into the crowd, killing at least three demonstrators. The King called for the assistance of the Indian Army on April 5, and the rebellion was halted the next day as Indian troops stopped the rebel column from approaching the Sikkimese capital of Gangtok. In return for the assistance, India would later annex Sikkim, which would become the 25th state of India on May 16, 1975.
- In India's Kerala state, 35 women at an agricultural workers colony were killed when the area where they were standing was hit by a lightning bolt.
- The city of Montreal announced Canada's first lottery to help pay for the 1976 Summer Olympics.
- Born: Adam Scott, American actor; in Santa Cruz, California

== April 4, 1973 (Wednesday) ==
- The World Trade Center officially opened in New York City with a ribbon cutting ceremony that included the two tallest buildings in the world, the 110-story buildings that were 1,350 feet (410 m) high.
- Prime Minister of Luxembourg Pierre Werner extended the operating livense to Compagnie Luxembourgeoise de Télédiffusion, now RTL Group, to 31 December 1995.
- Born: David Blaine, American illusionist and endurance artist; in Brooklyn, New York City.

== April 5, 1973 (Thursday) ==
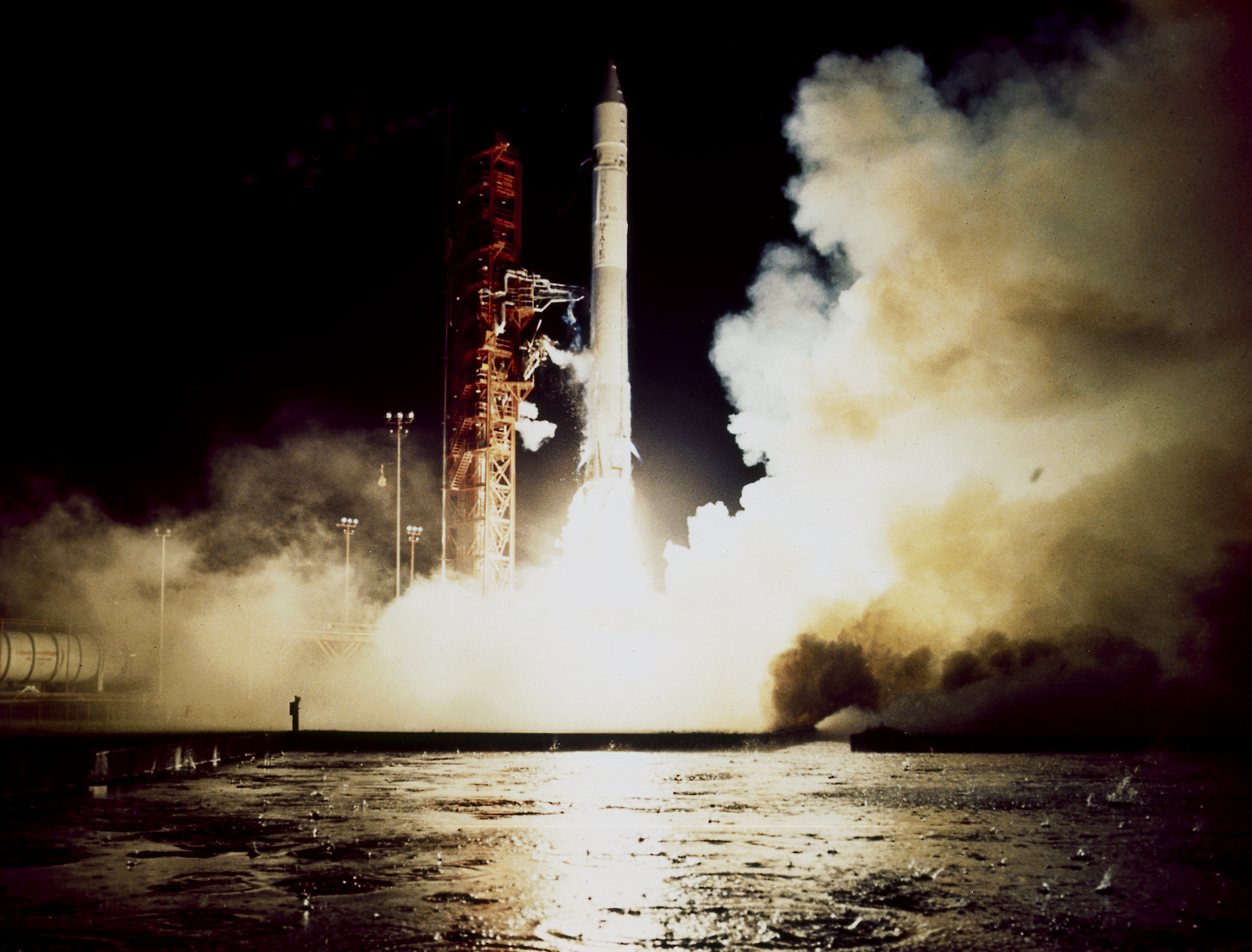
The launch of the Atlas-Centaur carrying the Pioneer G (11) spacecraft on April 5, 1973

- Representatives of the American Indian Movement (AIM), headed by Russell Means, and the United States government, by Assistant U.S. Attorney General Kent Frizzell, signed an agreement to end the 37-day siege of the town of Wounded Knee, South Dakota, by the AIM and militants within the Oglala Sioux nation. The six point agreement provided that Means would be invited to Washington D.C. to meet with White House representatives on April 7 and that the militants would leave Wounded Knee on the same day, submit to arrest by federal agents and travel to Rapid City for arraignment. The U.S. Department of Justice agreed to a federal investigation of affairs at the Pine Ridge Indian Reservation, an audit of tribal funds, and consideration of civil rights lawsuits on behalf of individuals for possible abuses by the tribal government or the Bureau of Indian Affairs, and the U.S. presidential treaty commission pledged to re-evaluate an 1868 treaty between the United States and the Sioux Nation.
- Pioneer 11 was launched on a mission to study the Solar System. The craft was sent up from the Kennedy Space Center in Cape Kennedy at Florida at 3:11 in the afternoon local time.
- Born: Pharrell Williams, American singer-songwriter known for the hit song Happy; in Virginia Beach, Virginia.

== April 6, 1973 (Friday) ==
- Fahri Korutürk was elected as the sixth President of Turkey on the 15th round of voting that had started on March 13. Admiral Korutürk, who had previously served as the Chief of the Navy of Turkey, received 365 votes out of 635 in the Grand National Assembly. The office of President had been vacant for nine days, since the term of President Cevdet had expired on March 28, and Korutürk was sworn in immediately.
- Pierre Messmer appointed his second cabinet as Prime Minister of France, following the wishes of President Georges Pompidou to have a new image of less adherence to the policies of Pompidou's predecessor, General Charles de Gaulle.
- Ron Blomberg of the New York Yankees became the first designated hitter in Major League Baseball, playing in a game at Boston's Fenway Park against the Boston Red Sox. Blomberg Was brought in during the first inning with the bases loaded and two outs, but was walked on ball four with five pitches from Luis Tiant. In the evening, Tony Oliva of the Minnesota Twins became the first-ever "DH" to hit a home run during the Twins 8 to 3 win over the host Oakland A's. Other designated hitters who saw action on the first on their teams were Orlando Cepeda (Boston), Ollie Brown (Milwaukee), and Dave McNally (Baltimore).

== April 7, 1973 (Saturday) ==
- Viet Cong guerrillas in South Vietnam shot down a helicopter that was carrying members of the International Commission of Control and Supervision (ICCS), killing all nine people aboard. The multinational peacekeeping team that was supervising the truce and ceasefire arising from the Paris Peace Accords, was flying from Can Tho to Vi Thanh, and was composed of two Hungarians, one Canadian, one Indonesian, two Viet Cong officers and three U.S. Air Force crew when it was hit. A Vietcong spokesman confirmed the deaths and said "The Provisional Revolutionary Government deeply regrets this unexpected accident." Another ICCS helicopter carrying 10 people (including observers from Poland, Hungary, Indonesia and Canada), was able to return safely to Can Tho after being hit by groundfire
- Tu te reconnaîtras ("You'll Recognize Yourself"), sung by Anne-Marie David, gave Luxembourg its second consecutive victory in the Eurovision Song Contest, finishing four points ahead of the entry from Spain, Eres tú, performed by the Spanish band Mocedades finished second and would go on to become a hit single in the U.S. and other nations in 1974. With 17 nations participating, the annual contest had 17 nations entered, and took place in Luxembourg City. For the first time, the Middle Eastern nation of Israel was allowed to participate with the European countries, and the requirement, that a nation's entry had to be sung in that nation's language, was dropped.
- The 1973 International Seven-A-Side Tournament, the first Rugby Sevens tournament to feature national representative teams, was played with teams from Australia, England, France, Ireland, New Zealand, Scotland, Wales, and an eight team, the Scottish Rugby Union's "Presidents VII", with players from South Africa, which was not allowed to send a team. All the games took place at Murrayfield in Edinburgh. In the final, England defeated Ireland, 22 to 18.
- Died:
  - Edith Baumann, 63, East German Communist who co-founded, with future Party Chairman Erich Honecker, the Free German Youth, the youth wing of the ruling SED party.
  - Nick Stuart (stage name for Niculae Pratza), 68, Romanian-born American bandleader and film actor
  - Ahmad Anatolly, 78, Soviet Azerbaijani stage actor

== April 8, 1973 (Sunday) ==
Picasso's Les Demoiselles d'Avignon from 1907

- Pablo Picasso, renowned as "the greatest artist of his time and a giant in the history of painting" died of heart failure at his home in France at Mougins in the Alpes-Maritimes département. Picasso and his wife Jacqueline Roque Picasso had been entertaining friends for dinner the previous night, and the artist went to his in-home studio to work on another painting before retiring in the early morning hours for sleep. Picasso had been scheduled to bring his new works to a showing at Avignon. Another critic observed, "We have still more than a quarter left in this century but it is highly unlikely that it will produce an artist to eclipse Pablo Picasso, the world's most influential and prolific modern painter."
- Israel's cabinet, led by Prime Minister Golda Meir, voted to prohibit any plans for Israeli citizens or private companies for purchase of land in the West Bank and other formerly Arab territories captured during the Six-Day War of 1967.
- Jackie Stewart won the 1973 BRDC International Trophy motor race at Silverstone.
- Born:
  - Emma Caulfield, American TV actress; in San Diego
  - Flying Water, French thoroughbred racehorse (died 1978)

== April 9, 1973 (Monday) ==
- Israel launched Operation Spring of Youth, an attack on several Palestine Liberation Organization (PLO) targets in Beirut and Sidon, Lebanon, in retaliation for the Munich massacre at the Summer Olympics in the previous year. Killed in the attack were Muhammad Youssef al-Najjar, one of Yasser Arafat's deputies in the al-Fatah group, Kamal Adwan, a PLO chief of operations, and Kamal Nasser, a PLO spokesman.
- The United Nations-Organization of African Unity conference on Southern Africa opened in Oslo, with the African leaders hosted by the government of Norway.
- Regulations went into effect in the United States requiring most grocery stores to post signs at their meat counters listing the limit for prices per pound for meat. The rules did not apply to stores that had revenues of less than $100,000 per year.

== April 10, 1973 (Tuesday) ==
- The crash of Invicta International Airlines Flight 435, a chartered Vickers Vanguard 952, killed 108 of the 145 people on board, and injured 37 of the 38 survivors. Of the passengers, 63 were members of the Ladies Guild of Axbridge, a town in Somerset in the United Kingdom; the plane departed from Bristol in the UK for them to attend the spring fair at Basel in Switzerland. The turboprop airplane crashed into a Swiss hillside near Hochwald; the crash left 55 children motherless.
- The Israeli Knesset elected Russian-born biophysicist Ephraim Katchalski, who had changed his surname to Katzir, as President of Israel, by a majority of 66 votes to 41 votes cast in favor of his opponent, Ephraim Urbach.
- Three days after the retaliation attack on PLO leaders in Lebanon, Israeli commandos raided Beirut, assassinating three additional leaders of the Palestinian Resistance Movement. The Lebanese army's inaction brought the immediate resignation of Prime Minister Saeb Salam.
- A new Constitution of Pakistan was approved by the legislative assembly by a vote of 125 to 2.
- Born: Selahattin Demirtaş, Turkish-Kurdish politician; in Elaziğ

== April 11, 1973 (Wednesday) ==
- The British House of Commons voted against restoring capital punishment by a margin of 142 votes, with only 178 in favor and 320 opposed.

== April 12, 1973 (Thursday) ==
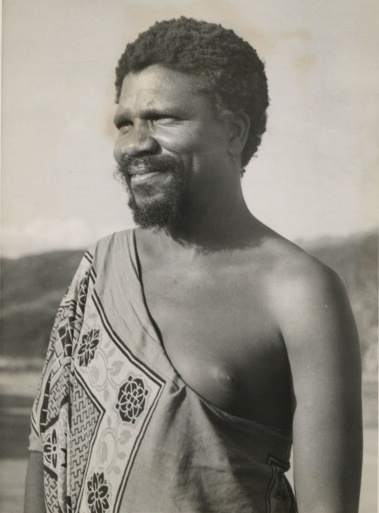
King Sobhuza II

- In the southern African kingdom of Swaziland (now Eswatini), King Sobhuza II annulled the constitution of 1968, dissolved the legislature, and assumed authority in all executive, judicial, and legislative matters. He would rule by decree until his death in 1982.
- The mid-air collision of two airplanes killed 16 people in the U.S. at NAS Moffett Field near Sunnyvale, California. A Convair 990 Coronado jet, with 11 civilian employees of NASA, was approaching its landing while a U.S. Navy Lockheed P3C Orion turboprop plane was making "touch-and-go" landings and takeoffs on the same runway. The two aircraft were reported to be "on roughly parallel courses" for a landing on the runway and were 300 feet (91 m) above the ground when the collision occurred.
- Born: David A. Marcus, French-born U.S. Internet entrepreneur and cryptocurrency; in Paris

== April 13, 1973 (Friday) ==
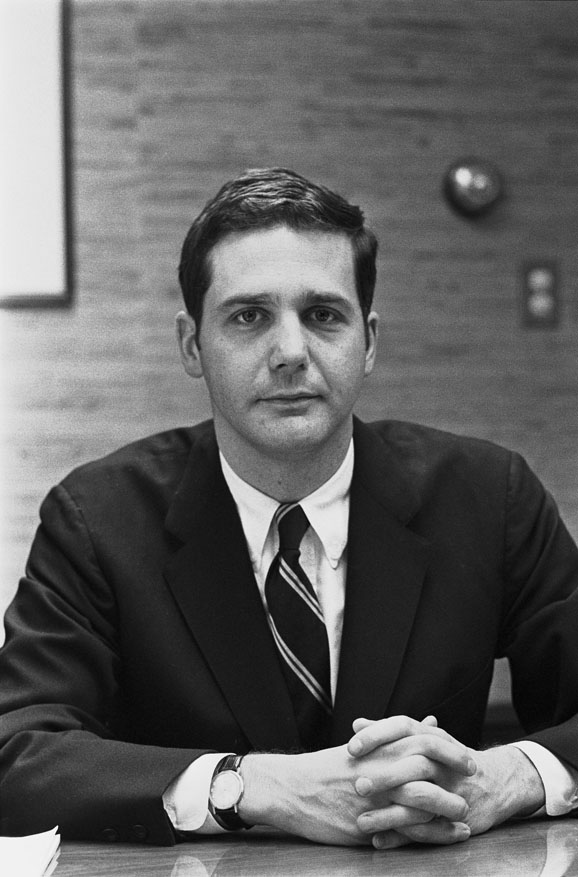
Magruder

- Jeb Stuart Magruder, a deputy campaign manager for U.S. President Nixon told federal prosecutors that he had perjured himself during a trial of the Watergate burglars, and implicated White House counsel John Dean and campaign manager (and former U.S. Attorney General) John Mitchell in the scandal. Magruder subsequently resigned on April 26.
- Born:
  - Mahee Ferdhaus, Bangladesh-born British entrepreneur who founded Channel S and the Prestige Auto Group; in Sylhet
  - Bokeem Woodbine, American television actor; in Harlem, New York City
- Died:
  - Dudley Senanayake, 61, Prime Minister of Ceylon (now Sri Lanka) 1952–1953, 1960 and 1965–1970; from a heart ailment
  - Pete Herman (ring name for Peter Gulotta), 77, U.S. boxer and world bantamweight champion 1917-1920 and 1921 despite his height of 5'2" (157 cm)
  - Balraj Sahni, 59, Indian Punjabi film and stage actor, died of a heart attack
  - Henry Darger, 81, celebrated outsider artist and writer, famous for his posthumously discovered 15,145 page manuscript The Story of the Vivian Girls, in What Is Known as the Realms of the Unreal, of the Glandeco-Angelinian War Storm, Caused by the Child Slave Rebellion, died in Chicago.

== April 14, 1973 (Saturday) ==
- The popular children's magazine Bobo for school-aged children was launched in Indonesia, five years after the Dutch version had been launched for preschoolers in the Netherlands.
- Born:
  - Adrien Brody, American film actor and Academy Award winner for The Pianist; in Queens, New York City
  - Douglas A. Zembiec, U.S. Marine Corps special operations agent known as the "Lion of Fallujah"; in Kealakekua, Hawaii (killed in action, 2007)
  - Zaza Napoli (stage name for Vladim Vladimirovich Kazantsev), Russian pop music singer and actor; in Yarovoye, Altai Krai, Russian SFSR, Soviet Union
- Died:
  - Sam DeStefano, 63, American mob enforcer described by FBI agent William F. Roemer Jr. as "the worst torture-murderer in the history of the United States", was shot and killed at his home in the Galewood neighborhood of Chicago.
  - John Gurdon, 74, British flying ace credited with 28 victories in the First World War
  - Minna Gombell, 80, American stage and film actress between 1929 and 1951, who also performed under the stage names Nancy Gardner and Winifred Lee

== April 15, 1973 (Sunday) ==
- In Libya's Berber city of Zuwarah, leader Muammar Gaddafi was expected to announce his resignation after having told his colleagues in the Revolutionary Command Council that he would agree to step down. Instead, Gaddafi announced his plan for a "Popular Revolution".
- Mehmet Naim Talu became the new Prime Minister of Turkey and formed a new cabinet of ministers. Talu had served as Minister of Trade and replaced Ferit Melen.
- In the South American nation of Chile, workers at the El Teniente copper mines walked off the job to demand higher wages, further damaging Chile's troubled economy. The strike would drag into June, leading to an attempted coup d'état against President Salvador Allende on June 29. On September 11, Allende would be killed in a coup by the Chilean Armed Forces and the military would rule the nation for 16 years.
- Attorney General Richard Kleindienst informed U.S. President Nixon that White House lawyer John Dean had been cooperating with federal prosecutors in the U.S. Justice Department's investigation into criminal charges against Chief of Staff H. R. Haldeman and Domestic Affairs advisor John Ehrlichman. Nixon fired Dean on April 30 and asked Haldeman and Ehrlichman to resign.
- The first Scrabble Players Championship, which had opened on March 18 and was limited to residents of the Brooklyn borough of New York City, was won by Jonathan Hatch.
- Born:
  - Paul Dana, American race car driver, in St. Louis (killed in racing accident, 2006)
  - Teddy Lučić, Swedish football centre back with 86 appearances for the Sweden national team; in Gothenburg

== April 16, 1973 (Monday) ==
- Excavation began in South Korea of the Cheonmachong tomb, the ornate interment site for an unknown king from who had ruled in Korea in the 5th century as a monarch in the Silla Kingdom.
- UNam, the Universidad Nacional de Misiones, was founded in the South American nation of Argentina at Posadas in the Misiones Province.
- The first "Player of the Week Award", originally limited to the National League, was announced at the end of the first week of the Major League Baseball season, conferred upon Jimmy Wynn of the Houston Astros, at the time a member of the National circuit.
- Born: Akon (stage name for Aliaune Damala Badara Akon Thiam), U.S. singer and record producer; to parents from the African nation of Senegal in St. Louis.
- Died:
  - Nino Bravo (stage name for Luis Manuel Ferri), 28, Spanish singer, was killed in a car accident
  - Sheridan Comerate, 45, American TV actor, was killed in a plane crash along with five other people when the Beechcraft Queen Air they were riding in fell apart in mid-air, apparently after the pilots had become intoxicated and were performing aerial stunts.
  - István Kertész, 43, Hungarian-born conductor, drowned while swimming off the coast of Israel at Herzliya. Kertész had been on a concert tour at the time of his accidental death.

== April 17, 1973 (Tuesday) ==
- Federal Express officially began operations, with the launch of 14 small aircraft from Memphis International Airport. On that night, Federal Express delivered 186 packages to 25 U.S. cities from Rochester, New York, to Miami, Florida.
- West Germany's counter-terrorist force GSG 9 (Grenzschutzgruppe 9) became operational after having been formed on September 26, 1972 (following the massacre at the 1972 Summer Olympic games in Munich) and would continue after German reunification.
- The Morganza Spillway on the Mississippi River, intended to protect the U.S. city of New Orleans from catastrophic flooding, was opened for the first time by the U.S. Army Corps of Engineers, in order to lower the water levels in response to the Mississippi flood of 1973. The opening flooded portions of the Atchafalaya River in Louisiana causing the deaths of thousands of head of cattle and white-tailed deer.
- The U.S. Department of Defense created the Defense Navigation Satellite Development Program, merging the functions of the U.S. Air Force Space and Missile Systems Organization (SAMSO) Project 621B and the U.S. Navy's Timation satellite programs. On May 2, 1974, the name of the program would be changed to the Navstar Global Positioning System.
- British Leyland launched its new Austin Allegro range of small family automobiles, to replace the aging 1100 and 1300 ranges of vehicles that had been sold under the Austin, Morris, Riley, Wolseley, MG and Vanden Plas brands from the range's 1962 launch.
- George Lucas began writing the 13-page treatment for The Star Wars, and initially presented it for consideration by United Artists, which declined to take it on.

== April 18, 1973 (Wednesday) ==
- Amin al-Hafez was appointed as the new Prime Minister of Lebanon after Saeb Salam's resignation. Hafez, selected by President Suleiman Franjieh, was approved by parliament and formed a cabinet one week later, taking office on April 25.
- U.S. President Nixon halted all taxes and restrictions on imported oil in order to fight a growing problem with a shortage of gasoline.
- The Oklahoma Sooners college football team, which had finished with a record of 10–1–0, won the Sugar Bowl after the season, and finished with a number 3 ranking, forfeited seven of its wins and the postseason victory, for an official finish of 3–8–0, after an assistant coach admitted altering the high school transcripts of several freshmen players in order to let them qualify for the team. The Sooners would later be suspended by the NCAA from postseason participation in the 1974 and 1975 seasons.
- Three robbers, including Mace Brown, who was on the FBI's Ten Most Wanted Fugitives list, invaded a branch of the Chase Manhattan Bank in the Harlem section of New York City and took 30 people hostage. A New York police patrol car was alerted moments after the men entered the bank, and Brown and the two men were surprised as they came back out with bags of cash. Brown was killed in the gunbattle that followed, and the other two men surrendered after negotiations.
- The science fiction film Soylent Green, set in the then-future year of 2022, premiered in the United States. Starring Charlton Heston, Leigh Taylor-Young, Chuck Connors and (in his final film role) Edward G. Robinson, the dystopian detective film was set in an overpopulated world, where the city of New York by itself had population of 40 million people and food, energy and housing were in short supply. Critics were unfavorable, with one saying "You still don't have much of a movie," and "As usual [Director Richard Fleischer] proves himself adept at subverting potentially meaningful material by shamelessly exploiting it", while another wrote "The script is starved for lack of wit or intelligence."
- Born:
  - Haile Gebrselassie, Ethiopian long-distance runner and Olympian who won the 10,000 meter race in 1996 and 2000, as well as four consecutive world championships (1993, 1995, 1997 and 1999); in Asella
  - Jad Abumrad, American radio host known for Radiolab; in Nashville, Tennessee
  - Galindo Mellado, former Mexican Army officer, drug lord and organized crime boss who co-founded Los Zetas; in Tampico Alto, Veracruz state (killed in shootout with federal security forces, 2014)

== April 19, 1973 (Thursday) ==
- The Portuguese Socialist Party (Partido Socialista), was founded in the German city of Bad Münstereifel, by militants from Portuguese Socialist Action. (Portuguese: Acção Socialista Portuguesa).
- Sosnovy Bor, Leningrad Oblast, was granted town status by the Soviet government.
- Died: Hans Kelsen, 91, Austrian legal theorist

== April 20, 1973 (Friday) ==
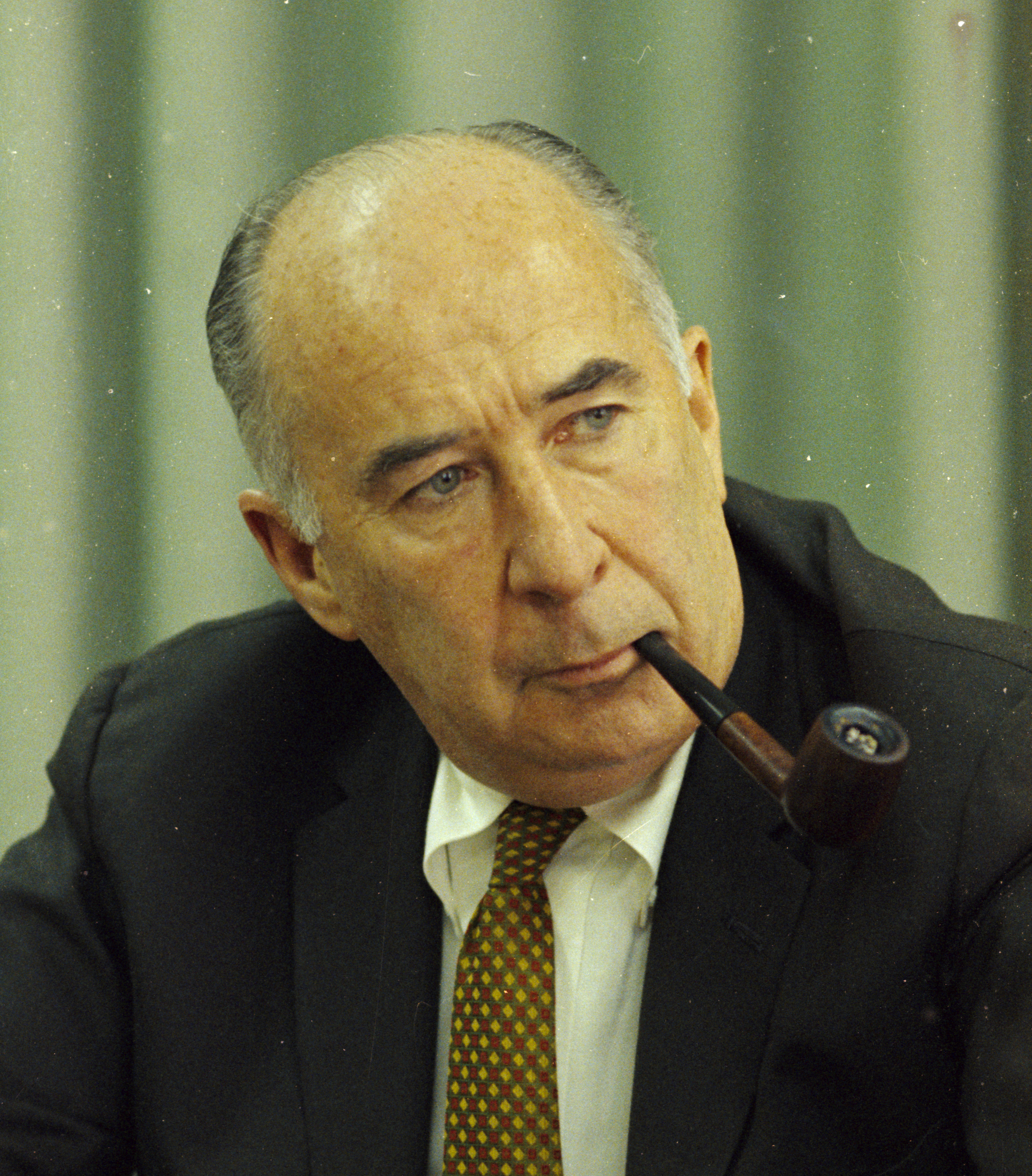
Mitchell

- As the extent of the Watergate scandal was further investigated, former U.S. Attorney General John N. Mitchell told a federal grand jury that he had attended meetings where plans had been discussed to set listening devices in the Democratic Party headquarters, but that he had never approved the scheme. The testimony contradicted statements before the U.S. Senate that he had no prior knowledge or involvement in the "bugging" of the Democratic National Party offices.
- Born: Toshihide Saito, Japanese soccer football defender and national team member; in Shizuoka
- Died:
  - Nikolay Simonov, 71, Soviet Russian stage and film actor
  - Michael Dransfield, 24, Australian poet, died of a drug overdose
  - Henri Rolin, 81, Belgian politician and international lawyer

== April 21, 1973 (Saturday) ==
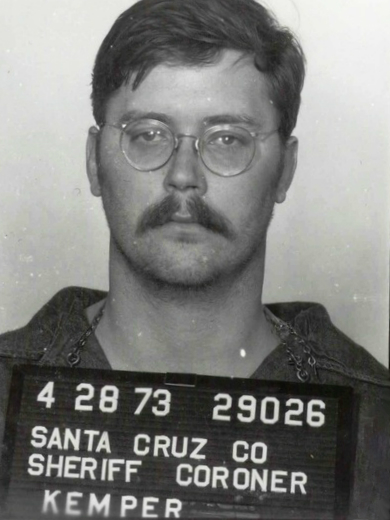
Kemper

- In Aptos, California, American serial killer Edmund Kemper murdered his last two victims, having killed eight people in less than a year. Kemper's final murders were the brutal slayings of his mother, Clarenell Strandberg, and her best friend, Sally Hallett. Kemper drove to Pueblo, Colorado, called police in Santa Cruz, California, and confessed to the killings. Kemper, who had killed his grandparents in 1964 when he was 15 years old but been placed in psychiatric care because of his age, was sentenced to life imprisonment.
- Chandka Medical College was founded in Pakistan in the city of Larkana in the Sindh province
- Pakistan Broadcasting Corporation established the Pakistan World Service for overseas Pakistanis.
- Died:
  - Merian C. Cooper, 79, American filmmaker and Academy Award winner known for the 1933 movie King Kong and as co-inventor of the Cinerama film projection process, as well as for heroism in two world wars.
  - Arthur Fadden, 79, Prime Minister of Australia for 39 days in 1941
  - Kemal Tahir, 63, Turkish novelist, journalist, and former political prisoner
  - Stergios Daoutis, 90+, Greek military hero in the 1907 Macedonian Struggle, the First Balkan War and the Second Balkan War

== April 22, 1973 (Sunday) ==
- A gunman, targeting acquaintances, killed six people and wounded nine other in a series of shootings in South Los Angeles. A seventh person, a security guard who engaged the gunman in a shootout, was fatally wounded by police after being mistaken for the perpetrator.
- The first LGBT protest in the South American nation of Chile took place in Santiago as a group of 50 gay, lesbian and transvestite demonstrators turned out to call attention to police harassment and brutality. The national police force, the Carabineros de Chile, declined to break up the protest, but moved a van into the area, after which the protesters dispersed on their own.
- The final Singapore Grand Prix was held before the event was discontinued. It would be brought back in 2008 as a round of the Formula One World Championship. The 1973 race was won by Vern Schuppan of Australia.
- Born:
  - Amos Wekesa, Ugandan businessman and founder of Great Lakes Safaris Limited; in Lwakhakha
- Died: Dalip Singh Saund, 73, Indian-born U.S. Congressman who was the first Asian American, the first native of India, the first member of a faith other than Christianity or Judaism (Saund was of the Sikh religion) to be elected to the United States Congress. Saund served two terms representing California's 29th District.

== April 23, 1973 (Monday) ==
- Egypt's president Anwar Sadat and Syria's president Hafez al-Assad began two days of meetings at Sadat's presidential resort at Borg El Arab to discuss in detail preparations for an October assault against Israel that would become the Yom Kippur War.
- The National Democratic Front of the Philippines (Pambansang Demokratikong Hanay ng Pilipinas or PDHP) terrorist organization was founded by Jose Maria Sison and Satur Ocampo, two members of the Communist Party of the Philippines. The PDHP issued its "Ten Point Program" declaring its program for "fighting for national freedom and for the democratic rights of the people".
- Born:
  - Derek Frey, American film producer and director of Tim Burton Productions; in Upper Darby Township, Pennsylvania
  - Cem Yılmaz, Turkish comedian and film actor; in Istanbul
  - Dr. Zubin Damania, American physician and Internet personality; in New Jersey
- Died:
  - Gunapala Piyasena Malalasekera, 73, Sri Lankan diplomat and philologist who authored the Malalasekara English-Sinhala Dictionary.
  - Dhirendra Verma, 75, Indian Hindi language poet and philologist known for Hindi Bhasha ka Itihasa
  - Tomoji Abe, 69, Japanese novelist and translator
  - George E. Allen, 77, U.S. government official who served as Commissioner of the District of Columbia from 1933 to 1940)

== April 24, 1973 (Tuesday) ==
The Supreme Court of India, by a margin of only 7 to 6, rendered its landmark judgment in the case of Kesavananda Bharati v. State of Kerala, referred to as "The Fundamental Rights Case". The Court held that it had the right to strike down any amendments to the Constitution of India that were in violation of the fundamental principles of the constitution.

- The U.S.Aggressive-class minesweeper USS Force suffered an engine room fire, and sank off Guam.
- Born: Sachin Tendulkar, Indian cricketer and politician; in Bombay (now Mumbai)

== April 25, 1973 (Wednesday) ==
- The 22 miles (35 km) Boulevard Périphérique, the first ring road, was completed to encircle Paris, capital of France. The highway had been planned before World War II, and construction had been going on since 1958.

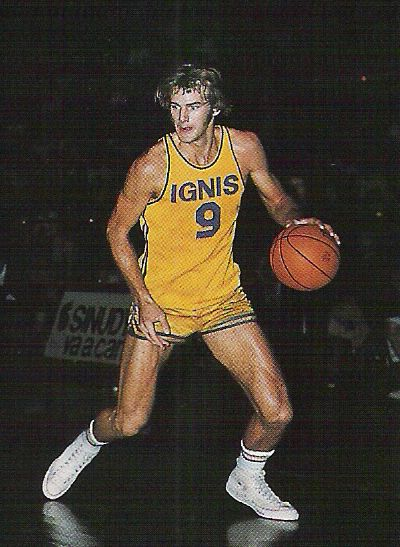
Italian league scoring leader Bob Morse

- In Italian professional basketball, the two teams of the 14-team top division, Serie A, played a one-game championship tiebreaker after both finished with a record of 24 wins and 2 losses. In the match in front of 7,000 fans in Bologna's Palazzo dello Sport, Ignis Varese defeated Simmenthal Milano, 74 to 70, with the help of 31 points from American Bob Morse, formerly of the University of Pennsylvania.

== April 26, 1973 (Thursday) ==
- The first day of trading took place on the Chicago Board Options Exchange for the purpose of buying and selling options to acquire stocks at a future time. The U.S. Department of Justice filed an antitrust suit the same day.
- A rocket attack on and near Cambodia's largest airport killed 24 civilians and wounded 55 others, as Communist Khmer Rouge fired 122-mm rockets into a district of squatter huts in Phnom Penh and at the terminal itself.
- Died: Irene Ryan, 70, American comedian and actress most famous for the long-running sitcom The Beverly Hillbillies. Ryan died after collapsing on stage on March 10 while appearing in the Broadway production of Pippin in New York City.

== April 27, 1973 (Friday) ==
- The Politburo of the Communist Party of the Soviet Union, the de facto leadership of the U.S.S.R., was changed as two members, Pyotr Y. Shelest and Gennady Voronov were ousted from their positions as full members. Communist Party First Secretary Leonid Brezhnev oversaw the adding of three allies, Foreign Minister Andrei Gromyko, Defense Minister Andrei Grechko and KGB Director Yuri Andropov to full membership in the ruling body.
- The United Kingdom concluded its forced expulsion of the Chagossians, residents of the Chagos Archipelago in the Indian Ocean, by evacuating the Peros Banhos atoll.
- L. Patrick Gray resigned as Acting Director of the FBI after having served since the death of J. Edgar Hoover on May 3, 1972. Gray quit after admitting that he had destroyed documents relating to the FBI's investigation of the Watergate scandal. Gray, whom the U.S. Senate Judiciary Committee had hesitated to confirm as FBI Director after his appointment by President Nixon, had withdrawn his request for nomination on April 5. Gray would testify later that, on June 21, 1972, he had been handed several top-secret cabled reports implicating the administration of U.S. President John F. Kennedy in the 1963 assassination of South Vietnam's president Ngo Dinh Diem as well as love letters written by Kennedy as a U.S. Senator "involving some of his peccadilloes, if you will."
- The European Launcher Development Organisation (ELDO), which was the precursor to the European Space Agency, discontinued its Europa rocket program, after six consecutive launch failures of its Coralie, Europa 1 and Europa 2 rockets between 1967 and its final try in 1971. The United Kingdom had announced its withdrawal of further support.
- The founding of the latest sports league, World Team Tennis (WTT), was announced at a press conference in Miami by Dennis Murphy, who had launched the American Basketball Association (ABA) and the World Hockey Association.
- Born: Timothy Joseph McGhee, American serial killer nicknamed "The Monster of Atwater", suspected in the murders of 12 people while in the Toonerville Rifa 13 gang; in Los Angeles
- Died: Jean Ross, 61, British journalist, political activist and film critic, died of cervical cancer.

== April 28, 1973 (Saturday) ==
- Clifford Glover, a 10-year-old African American boy, was shot and killed by a New York City Police Department undercover officer, Thomas Shea, after running from police along with his stepfather. The shooting took place in the South Jamaica section of the borough of Queens. Outraged residents rioted over the next several days, with 10 civilians and 14 policemen injured. Shea would be acquitted of charges of murder on June 12, 1974, leading to a riot of hundreds of South Jamaica residents.
- A series of munition explosions injured 48 people in Roseville, California. The blasts and fire at the Southern Pacific Railroad yard were traced to overheated brakes on a box car that was transporting highly explosive aircraft ammunition.
- Six Irishmen, including Joe Cahill, were arrested by the Irish Naval Service off County Waterford, on board a coaster carrying five tons of weapons destined for the Provisional Irish Republican Army.
- Six elderly women were killed in Kansas City, Kansas, after their apartment building was set on fire. An 18-year old newspaper carrier and a 16-year old accomplice were arrested later in the day on charges of arson and six counts of murder.
- Liverpool and Celtic finished the season as league champions of England and Scotland respectively. In The Football League, Liverpool had a record of 25 wins, 10 draws and 7 losses (25-10-7 for 60 points), ahead of Arsenal (23-11-8 for 57 points), despite Arsenal's 2-0 and 0-0 results against Liverpool. In Scotland, the championship was won by a single point in the standings, with Celtic (26-5-3 for 57 points) finishing ahead of Rangers (26-4-4 for 56 points).
- Born:
  - Ian Murdock, American software engineer and designer for Linux and Sun Microsystems; to American parents in Konstanz, West Germany (committed suicide, 2015)
  - Alejandro Ibarra, Mexican television actor and singer; in Mexico City
  - Isaac Carree, American gospel musician; in Greensboro, North Carolina
- Died:
  - Jacques Maritain, 90, French Catholic philosopher
  - Nikos Zachariadis, 70, Greek Communist politician, died while imprisoned in the Soviet Union, in what the Soviets said was a suicide.
  - Siri Derkert, 84, Swedish artist, sculptor and feminist

== April 29, 1973 (Sunday) ==
- In Mexico, six people were killed and 15 injured (five critically) in the 18th annual road race of 30 miles (48 km) from Jerez to Zacatecas City in the state of Zacatecas, as driver Daniel Quesada lost control and his car flipped into a crowd of spectators along the roadside.

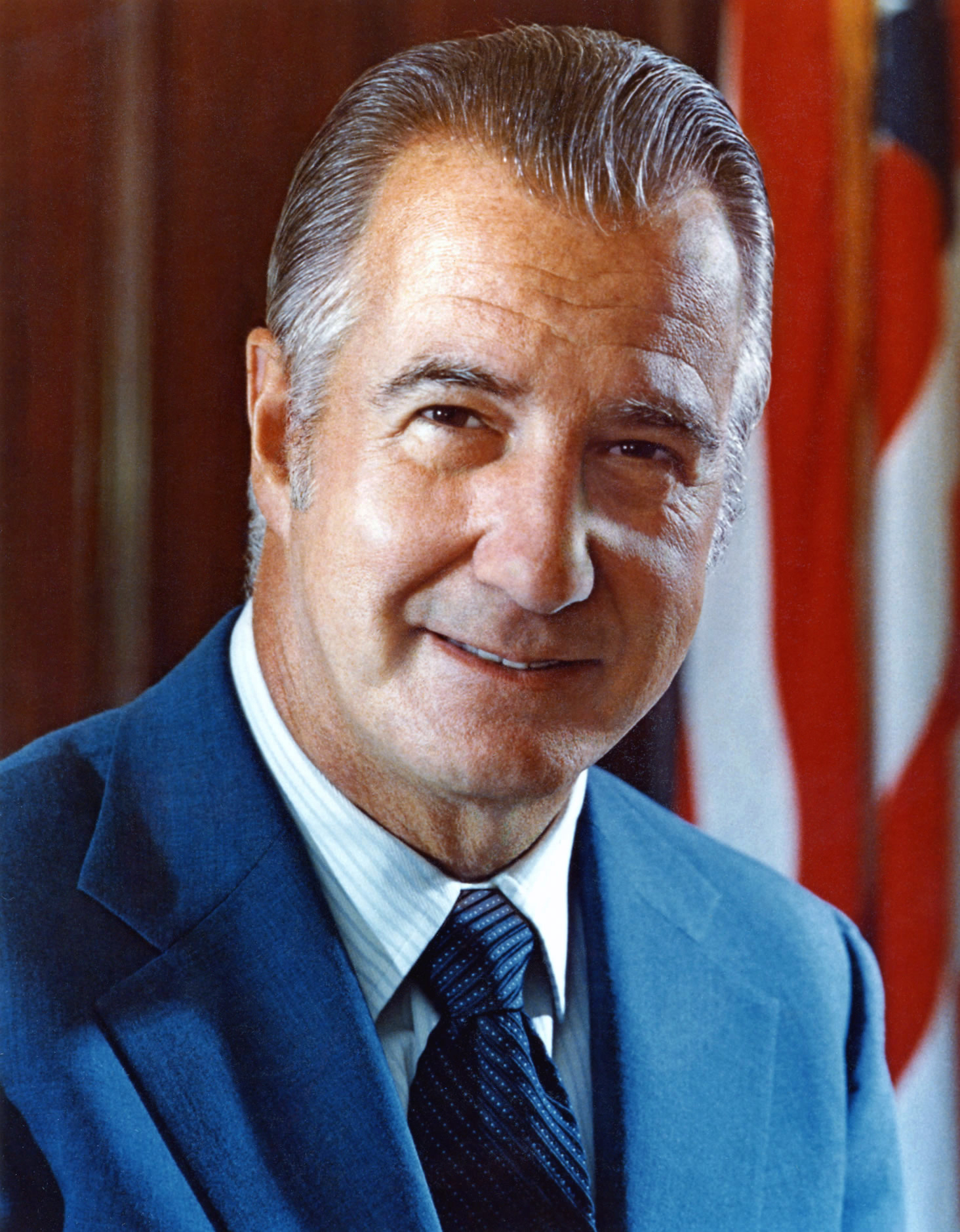
Most-favored for the 1976 Republican nomination, Spiro Agnew

- U.S. Vice President Spiro Agnew was the leading candidate among Republicans for the 1976 U.S. presidential election, according to the results of a survey released by opinion pollster George Gallup, with more than one-third (35%) of Republicans surveyed reporting Agnew as their first choice for the nomination, with California Governor Ronald Reagan a distant second at 20 percent. Agnew told a reporter for U.S. News and World Report the same day, "I'll run to win and I can win." Agnew would resign in a bribery scandal less than six months later.
- The singles competition at the 1973 Swedish Pro Tennis Championships in Gothenburg was won by Stan Smith of the U.S. over Australia's John Alexander. The doubles were won by Roy Emerson and Rod Laver, both of Australia, over the team of Yugoslavia's Nikki Pilić and Australia's Allan Stone.
- Born: David Belle, French actor, film choreographer and stunt coordinator credited as the founder of the sports discipline parkour; in Fécamp, Seine-Maritime département,
- Died: Flux Dundas, 74, British colonial administrator

== April 30, 1973 (Monday) ==
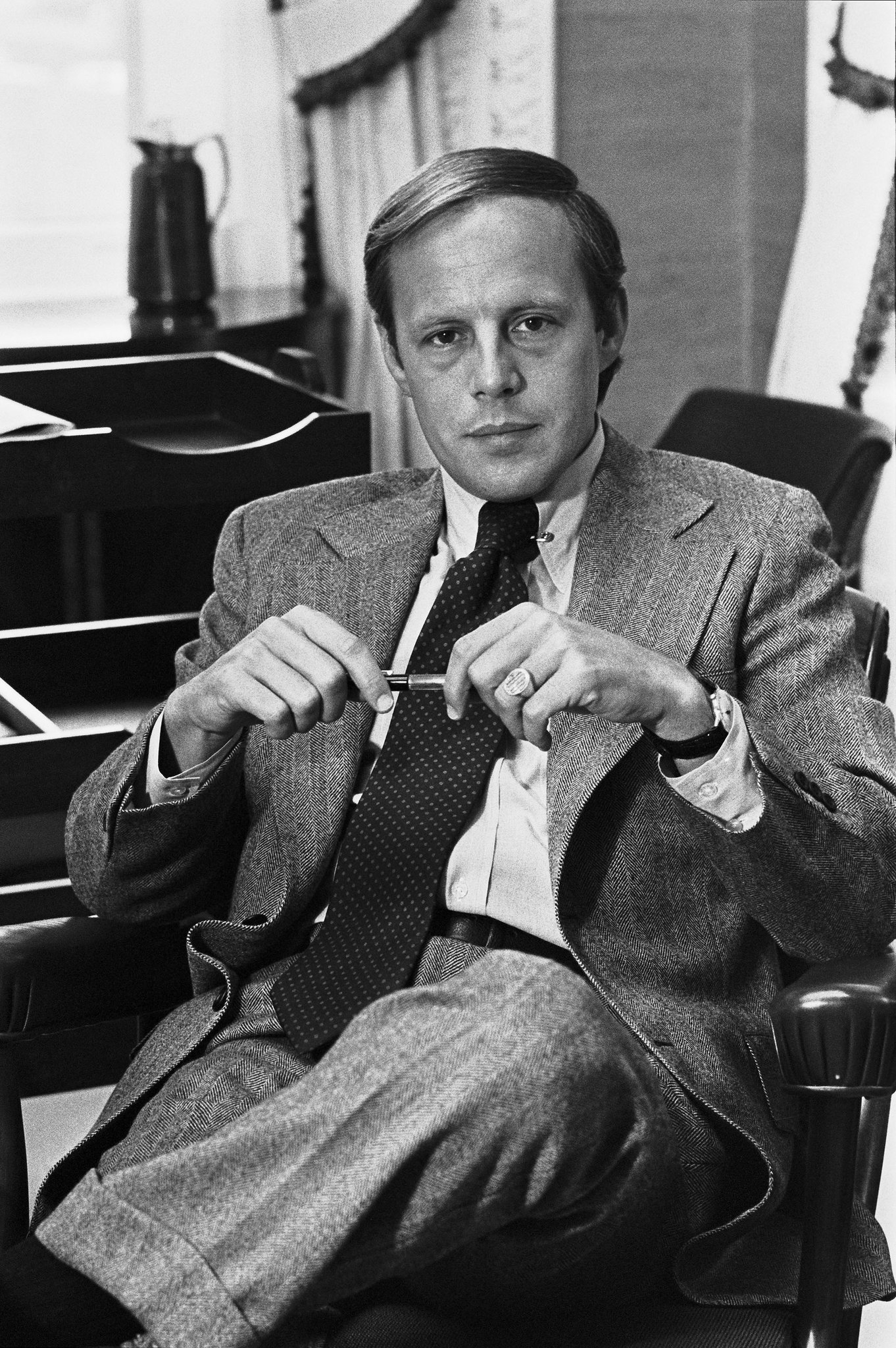
John Dean, fired

- As the Watergate Scandal became more complicated, U.S. President Richard Nixon fired White House Counsel John Dean and requested and received the resignations of Chief of Staff H.R. Haldeman, domestic affairs advisor John Ehrlichman, and U.S. Attorney General Richard Kleindienst.
- The Foreign Minister of the People's Democratic Republic of Yemen (South Yemen), Mohammed Saleh al-Aulaqi, was killed in a plane crash along with 24 of his nation's diplomats, including the South Yemeni ambassadors to the United Kingdom, the Soviet Union, Iraq, Somalia and Lebanon, when their plane went down 300 miles (480 km) north of Aden.
- Born: Leigh Francis, British comedian and actor; in Beeston, Leeds
- Died:
  - Václav Renč, Czech poet, 61, dramatist and translator
  - Argentine Navy Admiral Hermes Quijada, 52, was shot and killed by terrorists while he was driving his car in Buenos Aires.
