= Lwakhakha =

Lwakhakha may refer to the following:

- Lwakhakha, Uganda, the Ugandan town on the border with Kenya.
- Lwakhakha, Kenya, the Kenyan town on the border with Uganda
