= Allen Kagina =

Ugandan business administrator (born 1961)

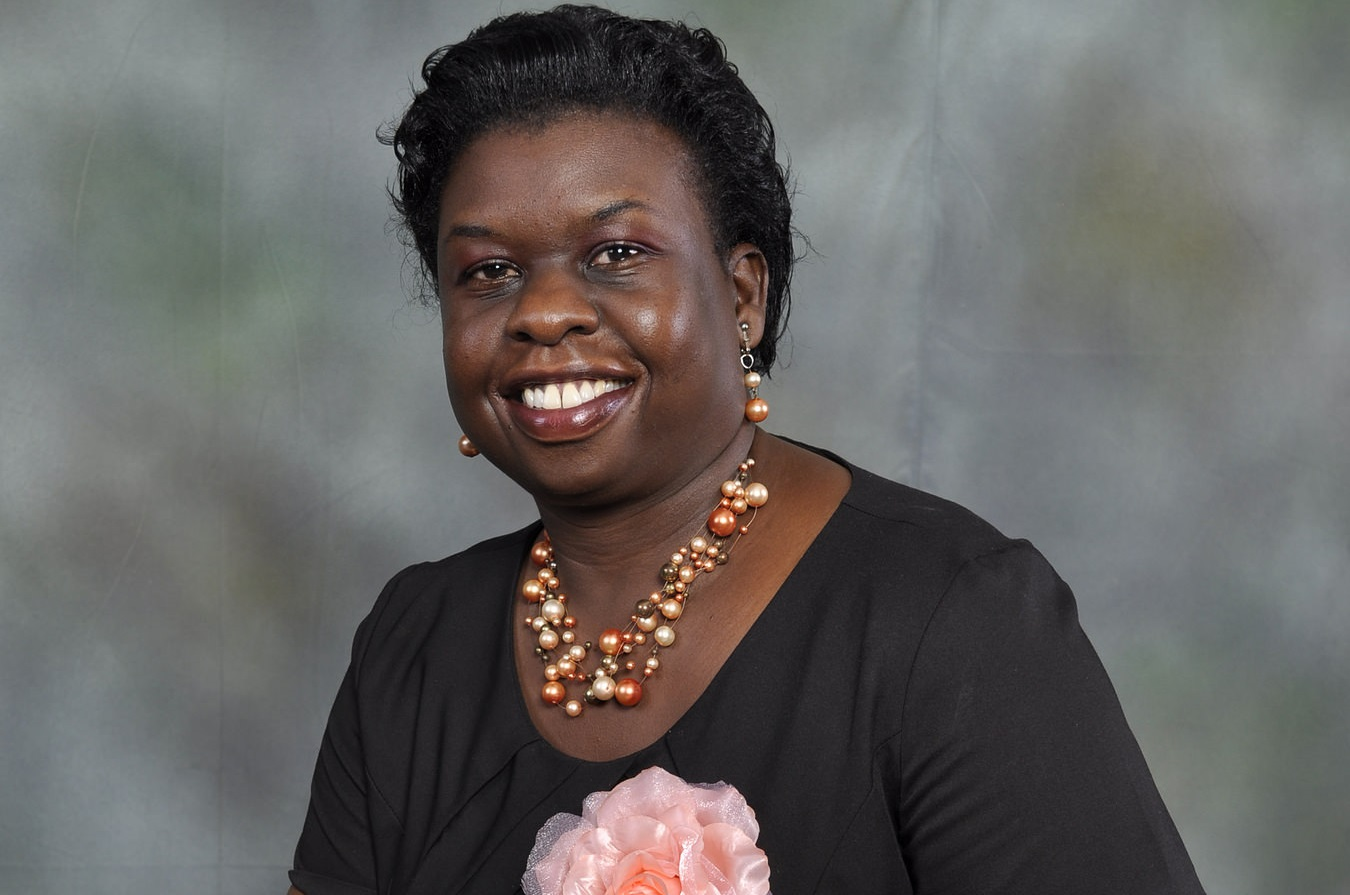
- Born: 1961 (age 64–65); Rukungiri District, Uganda
- Education: Makerere University (Bachelor of Science in psychology); University of Liverpool (Master of Public Administration)
- Occupation: Business administrator
- Years active: 1985–present
- Spouse: Paul Kagina
- Children: 3

Allen Catherine Kagina is a Ugandan administrator and corporate executive. She was the executive director of the Uganda National Roads Authority (UNRA). She was appointed to that position on 27 April 2015 and was made redundant on 23 December 2024. Before that, from 2004 until 2014, she served as the Commissioner General of the Uganda Revenue Authority (URA).

== Background and education ==
Kagina was born in Rukungiri District, Western Region of Uganda, in 1961 to Hezron and Catherine Kakuyo. She studied at Gayaza High School, a prestigious, private, boarding, all-girl middle and high school. She holds a Bachelor of Science degree in psychology obtained from Makerere University, Uganda's oldest and largest public university. She also holds a Master of Public Administration obtained from the University of Liverpool in the United Kingdom. She received a Master of Arts in Organizational Leadership and Management on 30 October 2015 from Uganda Christian University, in Mukono, Uganda.

== Work experience ==
Kagina started her career in 1985 as a teaching assistant at Makerere University. She later moved to the Office of the President. In 1992, she joined the URA as a senior principal revenue officer, serving in that capacity until 1998. In 2000, she was promoted to the rank of deputy commissioner for customs at URA, serving in that capacity until 2001. She was appointed commissioner general of URA in 2004. She is credited with improving the URA's financial performance. She was awarded the Corporate Leadership Award in February 2006, by Destiny Consult, an industry group, for turning around the performance of the tax body since her appointment to head the organization in 2004. In October 2010, her contract was renewed for another three years. Her monthly salary was reported to be UGX: 28 million (approximately US$11,250). On 27 April 2015, John Byabagambi, the Ugandan Minister of Works and Transport at that time, appointed her as the executive director of the UNRA, effective 1 May 2015.

== Personal details ==
Allen Kagina is married to Paul Kagina. Together, they are the parents of three children; Dan, Michelle and Mark. She is a born-again Christian.

== See also ==
- Juliana Kagwa
- Lilly Ajarova
- Shakila Rahim Lamar
- Gladys Kalema-Zikusoka
