= Pela Commodities =

Agricultural processing company in Uganda

Coordinates: 01°46′24″N 33°37′03″E

Pela Commodities Limited
- Type: Private
- Industry: Processing, packaging & distribution of agricultural grain products
- Founded: 2021
- Headquarters: Arapai, Soroti, Uganda
- Key people: Amos Wekesa (executive director)
- Products: Processed maize, beans, groundnuts, sim sim, sorghum and coffee
- Total assets: USh5 billion (US$1.5 million) (2021)

Pela Commodities, whose complete name is Pela Commodities Limited (PCL), is a Ugandan company that buys, processes, packages and markets agricultural grain products nationally and to neighboring countries in the area of the African Great Lakes. The company's headquarters and processing factory are located in the city of Soroti.

== Location ==
The company headquarters and main factory are located in Soroti Industrial Park, in Arapai sub-county, Soroti District, near the town of Soroti, adjacent to Soroti Fruit Processing Factory. This is approximately 299 kilometres (186 mi), by road, north-east of Kampala, Uganda's capital and largest city. The geographical coordinates of the company headquarters and processing factory are: 01°46'24.0"N, 33°37'03.0"E (Latitude:1.773333; Longitude:33.617500).

== Overview ==
In 2021, a group of four entrepreneurs decided to establish an agro-processing plant in the city of Soroti, in Uganda's Eastern Region. The factory was constructed on land availed by the Uganda Investment Authority, in Arapai Industrial Park, on the outskirts of Soroti. One of the four investors is Amos Wekesa, whose primary investments are in Uganda's hospitality industry. He was selected because grains are extensively grown in the Teso sub-region, and the city is within easy accessibility of the two major markets of Kenya and South Sudan.

The factory is capable of cleaning, sorting, drying and packaging up to 56 different types of grain. At maximum utilization, it is expected to process up to 600 metric tonnes of grain in 24 hours.

== Ownership ==
The ownership of the company and factory is as depicted in the table below:

Pela Commodities Limited stock ownership
Rank	Name of owner	Percentage ownership
1	Ugandan investor 1	
2	Ugandan investor 2	
3	Ugandan investor 3	
4	Amos Wekesa	
	Total	100.00
