= Juliana Kagwa =

Ugandan business executive

- Born: Uganda
- Education: Makerere University (BSc in Food Science and Technology); Edinburgh Business School (Master of Business Administration)
- Occupations: Corporate executive, business administrator and marketing consultant
- Years active: 2006 — present
- Known for: Marketing skills, Integrity
- Title: Chief Executive Officer; Uganda Tourism Board

Juliana Kagwa (also Juliana Kaggwa) (born circa 1980s) is a Ugandan marketing consultant and business executive. She currently serves as the chief executive officer of the Uganda Tourism Board (UTB), the Ugandan government agency charged with promoting the country as a tourism destination. She was appointed to the UTB position on 20 May 2025. Juliana Kaggwa also serves as Advisory Board member at Africa Nxt Gen Economic Foundation

Before her appointment at UTB, she was employed by SeedCo International, based in South Africa, where she was the Group Marketing and Sales Director.

== Background and education ==
She was born in Uganda circa 1980s. She studied at Makerere University, Uganda's oldest and largest public university, graduating with a Bachelor of Science in Food Science and Technology. She also holds a Master of Business Administration, obtained from the Edinburgh Business School, the Graduate School of Business of Heriot-Watt University.

== Career ==
Kagwa started out as a graduate management trainee at Diageo. She went on to work in various marketing engagements in Uganda and Kenya. She spent some time as the Uganda Country Manager for Heineken. She spent over 17 years at Uganda Breweries Limited, a Diageo subsidiary, rising to the positions of Corporate Relations Director and Marketing and Innovations Director. She is credited with mounting successful marketing and media campaigns that resulted in "driving brand growth".

She is reported to be an expert in marketing, communications, and innovation. As CEO, she is based in Kampala and reports directly to the Board of Directors of UTB. She replaced Lilly Ajarova, the previous CEO, whose contract ended in March 2025 and has since been appointed Senior Presidential Advisor on Tourism.

== See also ==
- Lilly Ajarova
- Shakila Rahim Lamar
- Gladys Kalema-Zikusoka
- Amos Wekesa
