= Lilly Ajarova =

Ugandan conservationist and tourism expert

- Born: 1970 (age 55–56); Uganda
- Education: Makerere University (Bachelor of Science in psychology and sociology); Eastern and Southern African Management Institute (Master of Business Administration); Commonwealth University, London (Doctor of Tourism & Hospitality Management, Honoris Causa)
- Occupations: Conservationist, business administrator, tourism expert
- Years active: 1995 — present
- Known for: Administrative Skills, Integrity, Wildlife Conservation
- Title: Senior Presidential Advisor on Tourism; Former Chief Executive Officer; Uganda Tourism Board

Lilly Ajarova (born in 1970) is a Ugandan conservationist and tourism expert. She currently serves as the Senior Presidential Advisor on Tourism in Uganda. Previously, she was the chief executive officer of the Uganda Tourism Board (UTB), the Ugandan government agency charged with promoting the country as a tourism destination, from January 2019 to March 2025. She was appointed to the UTB position on 10 January 2019.

Before her appointment at UTB, from 2005 until 2019, she served as the executive director of Chimpanzee Sanctuary & Wildlife Conservation Trust, the owner/operator of Ngamba Island Chimpanzee Sanctuary, on Lake Victoria.

== Background and education ==
She was born in Uganda in May 1970. She attended local primary and secondary schools. She studied at Makerere University, Uganda's oldest and largest public university, graduating with a Bachelor of Science in Psychology and Sociology in 1993. She obtained a Post Graduate Diploma in Hotel and Tourism Management from the International Institute of Tourism and Management in Austria in 1996. Her second degree is a Master of Business Administration, obtained from the Eastern and Southern African Management Institute (ESAMI) and Maastricht School of Management, Netherlands, in 2003. In addition, she has a certificate of competence in Board Matters, awarded by the Oslo and Akershus University College of Applied Sciences in 2014. In 2021, she was awarded an Honorary Doctor of Tourism & Hospitality Management (Honoris Causa) from Commonwealth University, London, UK.

== Career ==
Ajarova began her career at Delmira Tours and Travel as a Tour Manager in 1996, where she developed tour packages and coordinated VIP tours.

From December 1996 until February 2005, Ms Ajarova worked at the Uganda Wildlife Authority, as the Tourism Development and Marketing Manager and Public Relations Officer. In that capacity, she was responsible for the development of tourism products in Uganda's protected areas, including primate tracking, birding, butterfly watching, mountaineering, and community tourism. She developed the mountain gorilla tourism policy and guidelines and implemented a marketing strategy that more than doubled the number of tourists. Ajarova also developed the corporate brand for Uganda Wildlife Authority in 2002, including its slogan, logo, anthem, and uniform.

From February 2005 to February 2019, she served as the executive director of Chimpanzee Sanctuary & Wildlife Conservation Trust. Under her leadership, she grew the organization's budget by 400% in 5 years and established the Ngamba Chimpanzee Endowment Fund. She was the lead implementer of several significant conservation projects, including the Payment for Ecosystem Services (PES) Project, which was the first project globally to prove the effectiveness of PES as a viable means for conserving biodiversity. Her influence led to the inclusion of the PES policy in the National Environment Management Act, 2019. During her tenure, Ngamba Island Chimpanzee Sanctuary was rated a model sanctuary in Africa, and Chimpanzee Trust received an Innovative finalist prize from Yale University for its conservation program, along with 4 national awards and 9 international awards.

In January 2019, she was appointed to head UTB, replacing Stephen Asiimwe. Her deputy at UTB was Bradford Ochieng. She was replaced as executive director at the Chimpanzee Sanctuary Trust by Dr. Joshua Rukundo. She handed over that office on 5 March 2019.

As CEO of the Uganda Tourism Board from 2019 to 2025, Ajarova developed the strategic plan and policy documents aligned with Uganda Vision 2040 and National Development Plan III. She refreshed Uganda's destination brand to "Explore Uganda, The Pearl of Africa," which won 6 international awards. Under her leadership, UTB was recognized as the third best central government institution in Service Excellence Assessment for Financial Year 2020/21. She also operationalized the Uganda Convention Bureau, managing the MICE (Meetings, Incentives, Conferences, and Exhibitions) business in Uganda, which was ranked the 6th Best MICE destination in Africa in 2022. Additionally, she diversified tourism offerings to include adventure and community tourism products to position Uganda as a sustainable tourism destination.

In 2024, Ajarova was appointed as the Senior Presidential Advisor on Tourism, where she currently serves.

== Awards and recognition ==
Throughout her career, Ajarova has received numerous awards and recognitions:

- The Diamond Jubilee Medal in recognition of outstanding service and loyalty to Uganda, by His Excellency the President of the Republic of Uganda (2024)
- Africa Tourism Leadership Award, Women in Leadership Award, 3rd Place (2024)
- Conservation Champion Award, Chimpanzee Sanctuary & Wildlife Conservation Trust (2023)
- Wildlife Excellency Award, Ministry of Tourism, Wildlife and Antiquity, Uganda (2017)
- Wildlife Personality, Uganda Tourism Board Excellency Award (2017)
- Winner of 100 Women in Africa for development of travel, trade and conservation (2017)
- Women in Conservation Leadership, African Wildlife Foundation and Uganda Wildlife Authority (2014)
- The Golden Jubilee Award for the contribution made to tourism development and wildlife conservation in Uganda, by His Excellency the President of the Republic of Uganda (2014)

== Board memberships ==
Ajarova currently serves on several boards:

- Board Member, Chimfunshi Wildlife Orphanage, Zambia (2019 to present)
- Board Member, Nature Uganda (2019 to present)
- Board Member, Chimpanzee Sanctuary and Wildlife Conservation Trust (2017 to present)
- Board Member, Malaria Free Uganda (Ministry of Health)2021-todate

She previously served as:

- Board Member, Uganda Conservation Foundation, Kampala, Uganda (2006 - 2012)
- Steering Committee Member, Pan African Sanctuary Alliance, Oregon, USA (2008 - 2015)

== See also ==
- Allen Kagina
- Doris Akol
- Shakila Rahim Lamar
- Gladys Kalema-Zikusoka
- Amos Wekesa
- Juliana Kagwa
