= Wekesa =

Wekesa is a surname. Notable people with the surname include:

- Amos Wekesa (born 1973), Ugandan businessman, entrepreneur, and corporate executive
- Noah Wekesa (born 1936), Kenyan politician
- Paul Wekesa (born 1967), Kenyan tennis player
- Peter Wekesa (born 1961), Kenyan sprinter
