= May 1973 =

Month of 1973

<<	May 1973					>>
Su	Mo	Tu	We	Th	Fr	Sa
		1	2	3	4	5
6	7	8	9	10	11	12
13	14	15	16	17	18	19
20	21	22	23	24	25	26
27	28	29	30	31

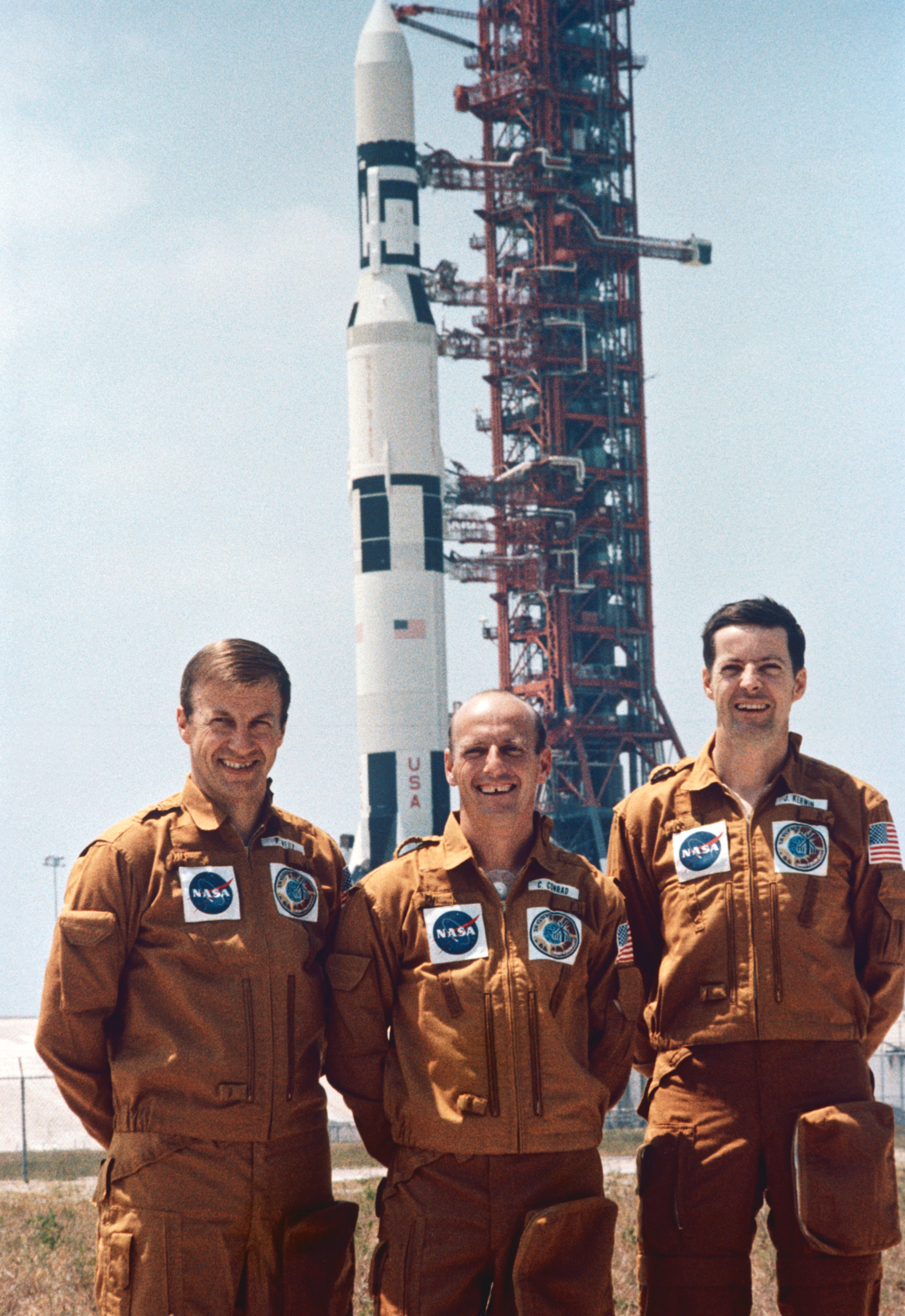
May 25, 1973: Weitz, Conrad and Kerwin are launched on the Skylab 2 repair mission as the first Skylab astronauts.

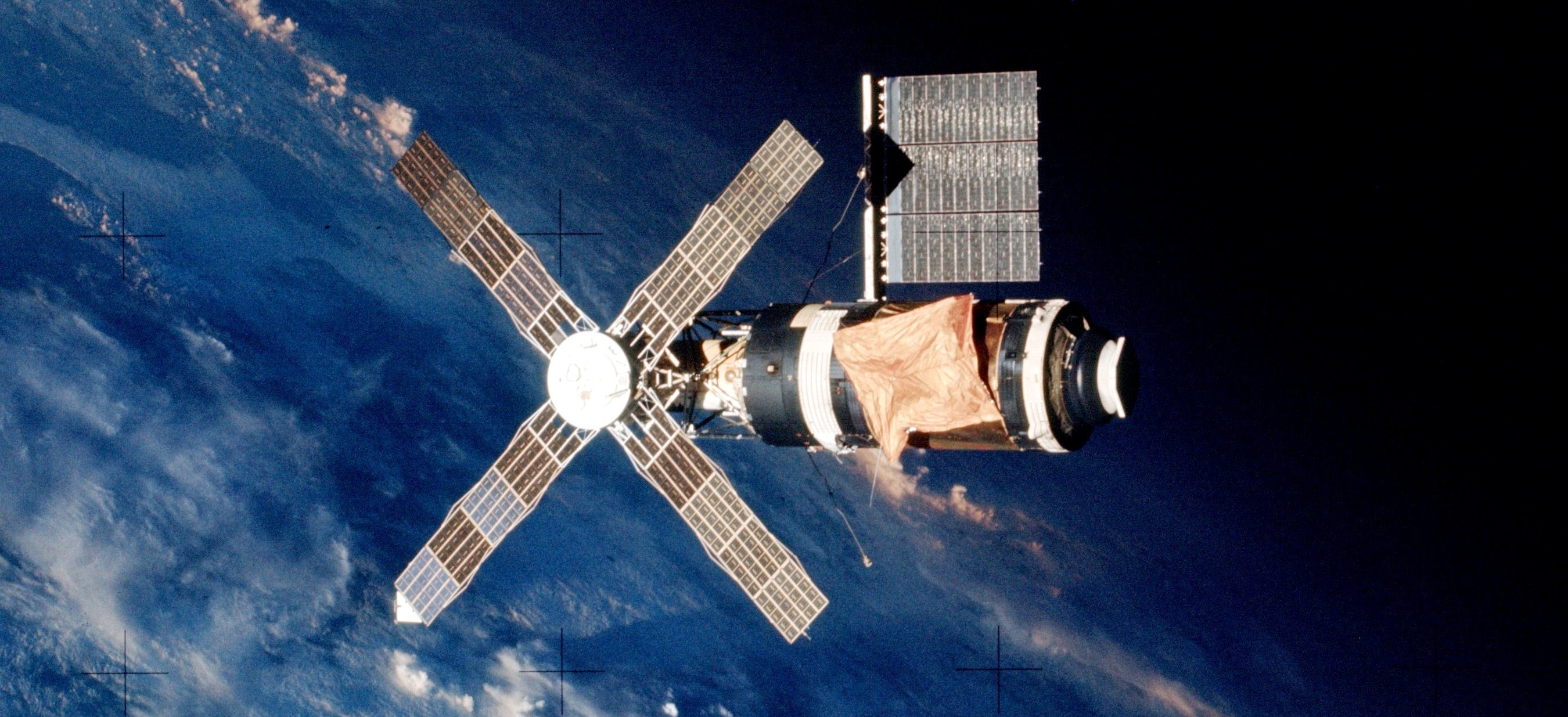
May 14, 1973: Skylab, the first U.S. space station, is launched into orbit

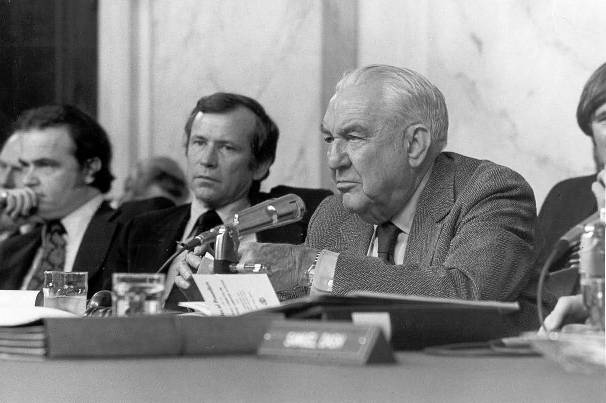
May 17, 1973: The Senate Watergate Hearings, chaired by Sam Ervin, begin and are televised live on all three American networks

The following events occurred in May 1973:

== May 1, 1973 (Tuesday) ==
- An estimated 1,600,000 workers in the United Kingdom stopped work in support of a Trades Union Congress "day of national protest and stoppage" against the Government's anti-inflation policy. The strike ended after a day of disruptions to public transportation and the publication of British newspapers.
- The government of Japan complete repayment of its debt to the U.S. for foreign aid received for food during the American occupation after World War II, paying $175,000,000 in one lump sum at the request of the U.S., which needed the money to relieve its balance of payments deficit.
- Three gunmen invaded a cargo terminal at New York's John F. Kennedy International Airport, tied up employees of Air India, and stole $500,000 worth of diamonds and jewelry that had been in transit. Because of the gunmen's acquaintance with Air India's operations, investigators suspected that the crime had been an "inside job".
- A group of three robbers in the U.S. entered a private elementary school in Peoria, Illinois and held about 50 children hostage after fleeing from the scene of an armed robbery. More than half of the 121 students at the Saint Cecilia Catholic School fled the building, but the rest were forced at gunpoint to remain in the school cafeteria. After police shot and killed one of the gunmen, the other two surrendered.
- In speeches made in Stockholm during Sweden's observance of the May Day holiday, Swedish Prime Minister Olof Palme and Foreign Minister Krister Wickman accused U.S. President Nixon of violating the Paris Peace Accords and of bombing refugees in Cambodia. Palme told a crowd, "One cannot win the confidence of people through violence," and Wickman said that fighting in Cambodia would have ended had it not been for the continued bombing of Cambodia against the Khmer Rouge guerrillas.
- John Habgood was consecrated Bishop of Durham.
- Born: Oliver Neuville, German international soccer player, in Locarno, Switzerland

== May 2, 1973 (Wednesday) ==
- A Nord 2052 Noratlas of the Portuguese Air Force crashed during a premature attempt to land at Mueda Airport in Mueda, Mozambique; all 11 people on board were killed.
- Former Texas Governor and U.S. Secretary of the Treasury John B. Connally, a longtime Democrat, announced that he was changing his allegiance to that of the rival Republican Party, as part of what many political observers believed to be a first step toward becoming the Republican nominee in the 1976 U.S. presidential election. Connally had served as Treasury Secretary during the administration of incumbent President Richard M. Nixon, a Republican, in 1971 and 1972. After the resignation of Vice President Spiro Agnew in October, Connally would be considered by Nixon as a replacement before the nomination being given to Michigan Congressman Gerald Ford, who would go on to become president in 1974 upon Nixon's resignation.
- Born: Florian Henckel von Donnersmarck, German film director; in Cologne

== May 3, 1973 (Thursday) ==
- The Northern Ireland Assembly Act received royal assent, allowing the UK government to set up a Northern Ireland Assembly and to attempt power sharing.
- U.S. President Nixon sent his fourth annual "State of the World" address to Congress and warned the government of North Vietnam that "We will not tolerate violations of the Vietnam agreement" made in the Paris Peace Accords in January, and that an invasion of South Vietnam "would risk revived confrontation with us."

== May 4, 1973 (Friday) ==
- Construction of the Sears Tower in Chicago was completed, making the tower the world's tallest building, at 1,451 feet (442 m).
- U.S. President Richard M. Nixon conferred with his wife and daughters at a family gathering at Camp David to discuss whether he should resign because of the Watergate scandal, according to a statement that would be made two months later by his daughter, Julie Nixon Eisenhower. Ms. Eisenhower told reporters, "He really loves the country and he would do anything that was best for the country. You know, he would say, 'Should I resign? Would it be better for the country? Would the wounds heal faster? Would it be able to move faster to other things?'" She added that the family was unanimous in talking him out of it, "because resigning would be an admission of wrongdoing and we also felt that he was the man for the job and he had started things and needed to finish them." Nixon's resignation at the time would have elevated Vice President Spiro Agnew (who was not connected to the Watergate scandal but who would quit five months later in a bribery scandal) to the presidency. Nixon would resign on August 9, 1974, after Agnew was replaced by House minority leader Gerald Ford.
- Terrence G. Leonhardy, the U.S. Consul General to Guadalajara in Mexico, was kidnapped by a group calling itself the Armed Revolutionary Forces of the People. His captors demanded that the Mexican government free 30 prisoners and allow them to be flown to Cuba, but after the prisoners arrived in Cuba, the kidnappers presented more demands before finally complying on May 7.

== May 5, 1973 (Saturday) ==
- Shambu Tamang became the youngest person to climb to the summit of Mount Everest. His actual age at the time was disputed.
- Sunderland achieved a shock 1 to 0 win over Leeds United in the FA Cup final at Wembley, with Ian Porterfield scoring the only goal of the game. It was the first time that an FA Cup winning team had no players who had played for a national team, and the first postwar FA Cup won to be won by a team outside the First Division.
- Secretariat won the Kentucky Derby.
- Led Zeppelin played before a crowd of 56,800 people at Tampa Stadium for the band's 1973 North American Tour, breaking the August 15, 1965, record of 55,600 set by The Beatles at Shea Stadium.
- Fianna Fáil's Erskine Hamilton Childers set off on a 28-day presidential campaign tour of Ireland.
- U.S. athlete Al Feuerbach broke Randy Matson's seven-year-old world record in the men's shot put by throwing 21.82 meters (71' 7") at the San Jose Invitational at San Jose State College.

== May 6, 1973 (Sunday) ==
- At Vatican City, Roman Catholic Pope Paul VI returned the relics of St. Mark to Pope Shenouda III of the Coptic Christian Church. Shnouda III then placed them in the Cathedral of St. Mark in Cairo, the only Christian church built by the Egyptian government.
- The World Hockey Association's first championship was won by the New England Whalers, at Boston Arena, in Game 5 of the best 4-of-7 series against the Winnipeg Jets. New England won the high-scoring game, 9 to 6. The Avco World Trophy, the WHA's counterpart to the NHL's Stanley Cup, wasn't ready, so the Whalers skated their victory lap with their Eastern Division trophy instead. The Whalers and the Jets would both be admitted to the National Hockey League in 1979 after the WHA folded; the Whalers are now the Carolina Hurricanes, and the original Jets are now the Utah Mammoth.
- Australia won the 11th Federation Cup women's tennis competition, held at Bad Homburg, West Germany.
- Died: Sir Ernest MacMillan, 79, Canadian conductor and composer

== May 7, 1973 (Monday) ==
- A 71-day standoff between federal authorities and American Indian Movement activists who were occupying the Pine Ridge Reservation at Wounded Knee, South Dakota, ended with the surrender of the leaders of the militants. Carter Camp and Leonard Crow Dog ordered the other militants to lay down their arms, and were transported to Rapid City to face criminal charges. Another 13 militants were arrested after they tried to slip through lines of federal agents who had surrounded the area. Another 120 members and sympathizers of the American Indian Movement (AIM) surrendered their weapons the next day as FBI agents and United States Marshals retook Wounded Knee.
- The government of Peru nationalized the South American nation's fishing industry, creating the state enterprise PescaPeru and confiscating the resources of companies from the U.S., Argentina, France, Norway, the UK and Japan.
- The U.S. state of Maryland ratified the Fifteenth Amendment to the United States Constitution, prohibiting states from interfering with a citizen's right to vote based on race, after having rejected it in 1870. The only states remaining that hadn't formally approved the 15th Amendment (which had become the law of the land in 1870 after approval by 30 of the then 40 U.S. states) were Kentucky, which would ratify in 1976, and Tennessee, which would do so in 1997.
- The Washington Post was awarded the Pulitzer Prize for public service as a result of the investigation of the Watergate break-in by Bob Woodward and Carl Bernstein, but the individual prize for reporting went instead to Robert Boyd and Clark Hoyt of the Knight Newspapers chain

== May 8, 1973 (Tuesday) ==
- The government of the Sudan released all of its political prisoners as a new constitution went into effect, guaranteeing the right of a speedy and fair trial to anyone accused of breaking the law. Many of the persons freed had been members of opposition political parties who had been arrested in 1971 after a failed coup.
- Palden Thandup Namgyal, ruler of the Himalayan Kingdom of Sikkim, signed an agreement at the request of India, giving up his authority as an absolute monarch, creating an elected legislature, and having a government of ministers nominated by India.
- Lebanon's Prime Minister Amin Hafez resigned a few hours after fighting broke out between Lebanese troops and Palestinian guerrillas.
- In a 9–7 losing effort against the San Francisco Giants, St. Louis Cardinals baseball ace Bob Gibson made his 242nd consecutive start. It was a new 20th-century record, passing that of Red Ruffing.

== May 9, 1973 (Wednesday) ==
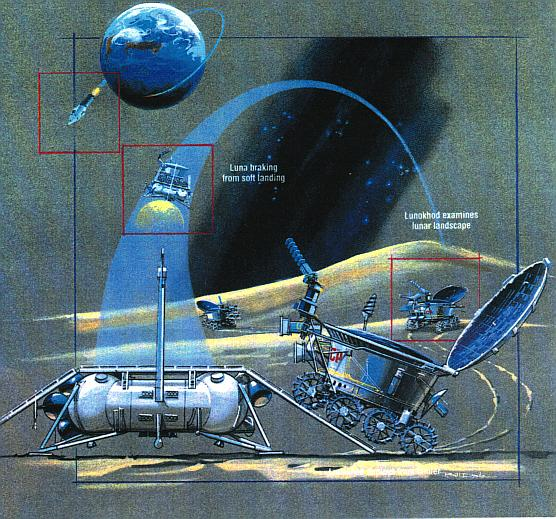
artist's rendition of Lunokhod, with its protective cover open

- Operating at the Le Monnier crater on the Moon, the Soviet lunar rover Lunokhod 2 encountered an accident due to a ground control mistake two days earlier that allowed dust to fall on the rover's solar cells. The protective lid, open in order to bring out sensory and transmission equipment, was left open when the rover was being maneuvered out of the crater and struck a wall, allowing the dust in. The rover's batteries overheated and it stopped working on May 11, exactly four months after its January 11 launch. More than 40 years would pass before another motorized vehicle moved across the lunar surface, with the arrival of China's Yutu rover on December 14, 2013.
- Color television was introduced to Czechoslovakia, with Československá televise (ČST) TV2 showing the first color TV programs from its transmitting stations in Prague (now in the Czech Republic) and Bratislava (now in Slovakia).

== May 10, 1973 (Thursday) ==
- The Polisario Front, a Sahrawi movement dedicated to the independence of Western Sahara, was formed.
- Former U.S. Attorney General John N. Mitchell and former Secretary of Commerce Maurice H. Stans were indicted by a federal grand jury on criminal charges of conspiracy to "conceal, by deceit, craft, trickery and dishonest means", along with financier Robert L. Vesco and their go-between, Harry L. Sears. The four were charged with not being cooperative in an investigation of Vesco's contribution to the 1972 re-election campaign of U.S. President Nixon. Vesco, who had fled to Costa Rica before the indictment was issued, had made the largest single contribution to the Nixon campaign, in the form of cash handed in a briefcase to Mitchell.
- President Nixon abandoned his plan to reorganize the executive branch of the government and the creation of a "super-cabinet" of three members who would oversee the heads of federal departments and agencies.
- The New York Knicks defeated the Los Angeles Lakers, 102–93 in Game 5 of the NBA Finals to win the National Basketball Association championship.
- The Montreal Canadiens defeated the Chicago Blackhawks, 6 to 4, in Game 6 of a best-3-of-5 series to win the Stanley Cup, championship of the National Hockey League. Chicago had tied the game, 4 to 4, before the third period started.
- The results of local elections in the United Kingdom showed a gain for Conservatives since the county council elections earlier in the year. The Liberals enjoyed notable success, becoming the largest group on Liverpool council. The Conservatives took control of five metropolitan districts, and also gain one Welsh district, Monmouth.
- In the Canadian town of Kenora, Ontario, an unidentified thief was killed in the explosion of his own weapon after robbing a branch of the Canadian Imperial Bank of Commerce. In the course of the robbery, the man had announced that he was carrying a bomb and that he was carrying the detonator in his clenched teeth. After taking a bank guard hostage, the man walked out with his money. A member of the Kenora police department, acting on his own initiative, shot the holdup man and a police investigation said that "it appeared that when the man was hit by the police bullet his jaws went slack" and the detonator triggered the bomb. The suspect, whose identity was never determined, was killed instantly and the hostage policeman was seriously injured.

== May 11, 1973 (Friday) ==
- Sweden's parliament, the Riksdag, enacted the world's first computer data protection law, the Datalagen or Data Act, to take effect on July 1, 1974.
- West Germany's Bundestag voted, 268 to 217, to ratify the Grundlagenvertrag, the December 21, 1972 treaty with East Germany. In a separate vote, 90 members of the CDU opposition party broke ranks and joined in a 358 to 127 vote for West Germany to join the United Nations, despite a condition that East Germany would also be admitted.

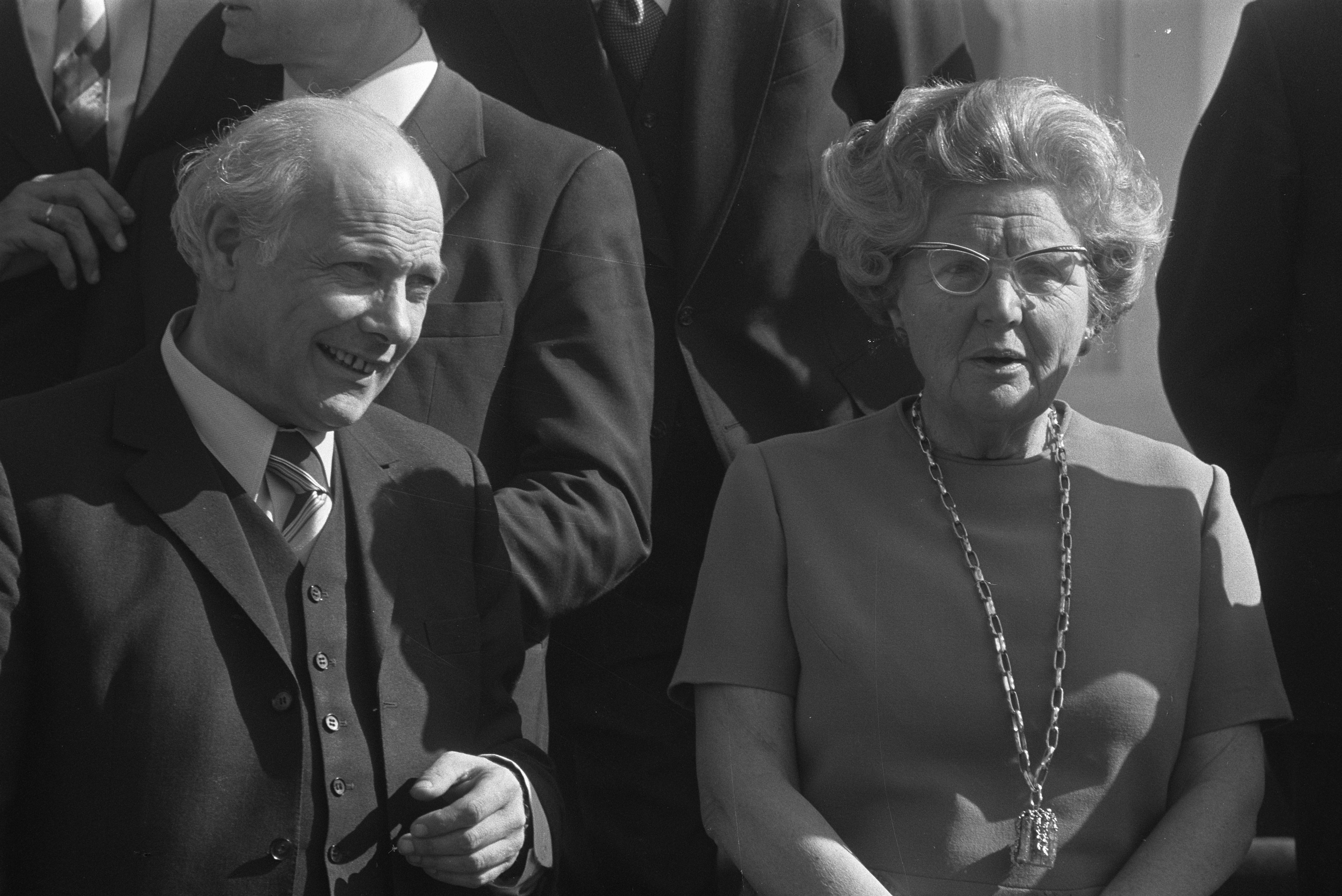
Premier Den Uyl with Queen Juliana

- Joop den Uyl became the new Prime Minister of the Netherlands, replacing Barend Biesheuvel.
- All federal espionage charges against Daniel Ellsberg, arising from his 1971 leaking of the "Pentagon Papers", were dismissed by Judge William Byrne because of government misconduct in the prosecution and evidence-gathering. Byrne said in his order that "The totality of the circumstances... offend a sense of justice. The bizarre events have incurably infected the prosecution of this case."
- The crash of Aeroflot Flight 6551 in the Soviet Union killed all 63 people on board. The Ilyushin Il-18 turboprop had taken off from Tashkent at 1:25 in the morning local time in the Uzbek SSR, with a destination of Novosibirsk in the Russian SSR, and went down two and a half hours later, with the wreckage being found 52 miles (84 km) south of Semipalatinsk.
- The Soviet Union made its fourth attempt to launch a space station, Salyut 3, having been successful with keeping Salyut 1 in orbit for six months in 1971, but failing to orbit a second station on July 29, 1972, and already seeing problems with Salyut 2, which had been unstable since its launch on April 3, 1973. The latest Salyut went up from Baikonur Cosmodrome at 6:20 in the morning local time, three days before the scheduled U.S. launch of Skylab, but was apparently damaged after it reached orbit, leading to the cancellation of the mission of two cosmonauts who would have docked with the orbiting station. Salyut 3 orbited the Earth 175 times over 11 days before burning up in the Earth's atmosphere on May 22.
- Died: Lex Barker, 54, American film actor best known for portraying Tarzan in five films, died of a heart attack.

== May 12, 1973 (Saturday) ==
- Two American mountaineers, John Roskelley and Louis Reichardt, made the highest ascent of a mountain without using supplemental oxygen, climbing the seventh-highest peak in the world, reaching the summit at 26,795 feet (8,167 m) without oxygen tanks.
- The Indiana Pacers won the championship of the American Basketball Association in Game 7 of the best 4-of-7 series, defeating the Kentucky Colonels, 88 to 81, in Louisville.
- Born: Mackenzie Astin, American TV and film actor; as the son of actors John Astin and Patty Duke, in Los Angeles.
- Died:
  - Monika Ertl, 35, German-born Bolivian terrorist known for her mission to avenge the execution of Che Guevara and her assassination of Colonel Roberto Quintanilla, was ambushed and killed by the Bolivian Army at the city of El Alto.
  - Art Pollard, 46, became the first of several people to be killed in the disastrous 1973 Indianapolis 500, after crashing during time trials at 191.4 miles per hour (308.0 km/h). David "Swede" Savage would be fatally injured in the race itself, and Armando Moreno, a member of one of the pit crews, would die instantly after being hit by a fire truck racing to Savage's crash site.

== May 13, 1973 (Sunday) ==
- Bobby Riggs challenged and defeated Margaret Court, the world's #1-rated women's player, in a nationally televised tennis match in Ramona, California, northeast of San Diego. Riggs was 55 years old and had won Wimbledon in 1939, as well as the U.S. Open in 1939 and 1941. Court, 30 years old, had won 24 Grand Slam singles titles and was the reigning champion of the Australian and French Open competitions (and would win the U.S. Open later in the year. Riggs, a self-admitted male chauvinist who had said that "the girls" should not get as much money as "the men", said that he wanted to challenge Billie Jean King in a match. Riggs won 6–2, 6–1, which would lead to the huge Battle of the Sexes match against Billie Jean King on September 20.

== May 14, 1973 (Monday) ==
- Skylab, the first space station of the United States, was launched but was seriously damaged during liftoff. NASA officials said that 63 seconds after an almost perfect launch, "an accidental signal" from ground control at Cape Kennedy loosened a protective micrometeorite shield and caused a malfunction in two of Skylab's four solar panels, removing half of its electrical power. The scheduled May 15 liftoff of the Skylab crew was postponed.
- The British House of Commons voted to abolish capital punishment in Northern Ireland.
- The United States opened its first diplomatic mission in the People's Republic of China, with David K.E. Bruce serving as the first American liaison to China since the 1949 establishment of a communist government there.
- At the Cannes festival, Day for Night (La nuit americaine) by François Truffaut was previewed out of competition.
- Born: Natalie Appleton, Canadian singer, member of All Saints; in Hamilton, Ontario

== May 15, 1973 (Tuesday) ==
- Voting took place in Sierra Leone, with almost all seats won by the All People's Congress (APC). The main opposition party, the Sierra Leone People's Party boycotted the election because of irregularities, and most APC candidates were elected unopposed.
- In the House of Commons of the United Kingdom, Prime Minister Edward Heath described large payments made by Lonrho to Duncan Sandys through the tax haven of the Cayman Islands, as the "unacceptable face of capitalism." The Sandys scandal came at a time when the government was trying to implement a counter-inflation policy,
- The Zambian Army shot three North American tourists who were visiting the Rhodesian side of Victoria Falls, killing two young women who were visiting from Canada and seriously wounding an American. Christine Sinclair of Guelph, Ontario, was killed instantly, while Marion Drijber of Rockwood was hit by bullets and fell into the river below and was swept away.
- Died: Colonel Andrés Selich, Bolivia's former Interior Minister, was killed. The government said that Selich had fallen downstairs while trying to escape arrest for an attempted coup-d'état against President Hugo Banzer, but later conceded that Selich had been beaten by police along with seven other people. In 1967, Selich had led the regiment that captured and executed Ernesto Guevara, and Selich had later been a part of the three man military junta that had overthrown President Juan José Torres in 1971.

== May 16, 1973 (Wednesday) ==
- Rainer Barzel, who lost his chance to be Chancellor of West Germany in the 1972 defeat in Bundestag elections of his Christian Democratic Union (CDU) party by Chancellor Willy Brandt's Social Democrats, resigned as Chairman of the Christlich Demokratische Union (CDU). Barzel's action came after the CDU's members of parliament voted against the entry of West Germany and East Germany into the United Nations. Barzel was replaced by Helmut Kohl, chief minister of the Rheinland-Pfalz state, who would later become Chancellor in 1987.
- In Tam was appointed as the new Prime Minister of Cambodia by the American-backed government of President Lon Nol, along with 20 other cabinet members.
- At the Kaftanzoglio Stadium in Thessaloniki, A. C. Milan won the final match of the 1972–73 European Cup Winners' Cup, beating Leeds United, 1 to 0, on a goal by Luciano Chiarugi.
- The British Post Office issued its first "PHQ card" for collectors, a postcard depicting a large image of one of its commemorative stamps. The first PHQ of the 3-pence stamp commemorating 100 years of cricket and featuring an image of W. G. Grace.

== May 17, 1973 (Thursday) ==
- All three commercial television networks in the U.S. interrupted their regular daytime programming at 10:00 in the morning Washington DC time to show live hearings of witness testimony in the U. S. Senate's subcommittee investigation of the Watergate scandal, as the first hearings were held, chaired by North Carolina U.S. Senator Sam Ervin. The first witness to testify was Robert C. Odle Jr., a former official with the Committee to Re-Elect the President.
- Four people were killed and 52 injured in Italy by a hand grenade, thrown by a terrorist during a ceremony at police headquarters in Milan. Gianfranco Bertoli, who declared himself an individualist anarchist, said that he had intended to assassinate Italy's Interior Minister, though Rumor had left the room a few minutes before the explosion.
- North Korea received its first major international recognition after the World Health Organization (WHO) voted, 56 to 41, to admit the closed Communist nation as a member.
- The U.S. Atomic Energy Commission (AEC) set off three nuclear weapons underground at point 30 miles (48 km) from Meeker, Colorado, in the first test of Project Rio Blanco in the AEC's Operation Plowshare program for the peaceful use of atomic energy. The project, financed in large part by CER Geonuclear Corporation and Equity Oil Company, was done for the purpose of "freeing vast quantities of natural gas locked in tightly compacted subterranean rocks." The three atomic weapons were 30 kilotons apiece, with a combined force "four times that of the Hiroshima atomic bomb" used in 1945, and detonated at depths ranging from 5,530 feet (1,690 m) to 6,830 feet (2,080 m)
- Born: Josh Homme, American singer and musician; frontman of Queens of the Stone Age, in Joshua Tree, California

== May 18, 1973 (Friday) ==
- All 81 people aboard Aeroflot Flight 109 were killed when the Tupolev Tu-104 exploded in the course of an attempted hijacking. The flight had originated in Moscow the night before, with multiple stops en route to a final scheduled destination of Chita, and had departed Irkutsk early in the morning with 72 passengers and nine crew. At 9:36 a.m. local time, as the plane was making its approach to Chita, the crew told the control tower that a hijacking was in progress. Three minutes later, at an altitude of 21,300 feet (6,500 m), the aircraft disappeared from radar. A subsequent investigation by Soviet authorities concluded that the hijacker, Chingis Rzayev, was carrying a TNT explosive device; that a security officer on board, Vladimir Yezhikov, had shot Rzayev; and that as he was dying, Rzayev had detonated the 12 pounds (5.4 kg). The crash was not mentioned in the censored Soviet press, but reports reached the West three weeks later.
- As the "Cod War" between the UK and Iceland continued, Joseph Godber, Britain's Minister of Agriculture, Fisheries and Food, announced that Royal Navy frigates would protect British trawlers fishing within the disputed 50 miles (80 km) territorial limit claimed by Iceland.
- Archibald Cox, a professor at the Harvard University College of Law, was selected by U.S. Attorney General Elliot Richardson to serve as the U.S. Department of Justice's Special Prosecutor for crimes committed in the Watergate scandal.
- Leonid Brezhnev began his official visit to West Germany, the first by a Soviet leader, arriving at the West German capital of Bonn, near Cologne. Chancellor Willy Brandt welcomed Brezhnev.
- Died: Dieudonné Costes, 80, French aviator

== May 19, 1973 (Saturday) ==
- The Currency Board of the United Arab Emirates began operations and issued the first UAE currency, the dirham, to replace several different currencies — the Gulf rupee, the Bahraini dinar (used in Abu Dhabi) and the Qatari riyal (used in the other Emirates).
- Secretariat won the Preakness Stakes, after having won the Kentucky Derby two weeks earlier, raising the possibility that he would become the first thoroughbred racehorse to win the Triple Crown of American horseracing.

== May 20, 1973 (Sunday) ==
- Pope Paul VI, leader of the Roman Catholic Church and Pope Shenouda III of Alexandria, leader of the Coptic Christian Church, issued a joint declaration declaring their agreement that "We confess that our Lord and God and Saviour and King of us all, Jesus Christ, is perfect God with respect to His Divinity, perfect man with respect to His humanity. In Him His divinity is united with His humanity in a real, perfect union without mingling, without commixtion, without confusion, without alteration, without division, without separation," and agreed to set up a theological dialogue between the two churches.
- Britain's Royal Navy sent three frigates to protect British fishing vessels from Icelandic ships in the Cod War dispute.
- In a referendum in Switzerland, voters endorsed a repeal of an 1874 constitutional amendment that had put a ban on Jesuits.
- In an accident at the Gran Premio Delle Nazioni motorcycle race at Monza, defending 1972 250cc champion Jarno Saarinen of Finland was killed along with popular Italian competitor Renzo Pasolini, while 10 other competitors were injured in a pileup that happened after Pasolini's bike crashed.
- In the final day of Italy's 1972–73 Serie A season, the highest level of competition for Italian soccer football, top-ranked A.C. Milan lost in an upset, 5 to 2, to 10th-ranked Hellas Verona, while second-place Juventus won its match against 11th-ranked Roma, and third-place Lazio lost, 1 to 0, to 9th-ranked Naples. Going into the 30th and final week of play, Milan had 44 points (18 wins and 8 draws) while Juventus (17 wins and 9 draws) and Lazio (16 wins and 11 draws) both had 43 points in the standings.

== May 21, 1973 (Monday) ==
- The "Masagana 99" economic program was launched in the Philippines by President Ferdinand Marcos to increase the nation's rice production after a severe shortage in an important staple. The word "masagana" was a Tagalog language word for bountiful, and "99" referred to the target for the number of sacks of rice per hectare of land. The program would be successful in that respect, more than doubling production as measured by cavans (60 kilograms) per hectare from 40 to 99, with the Philippines attaining self-sufficiency by 1976, and becoming an exporter of rice by 1978, but also left thousands of poor farmers in debt.
- The Rantau Panjang – Sungai Golok Bridge on the Malaysia-Thailand border, built by both nations and officially called the "Harmony Bridge", opened in Kelantan in a ceremony by Malaysian Premier Tun Abdul Razak and Thailand's Thanom Kittikachorn.
- In the Italian city of Bergamo, Mriko Panattoni, 8-year-old son of a caterer, was abducted in front of the school; two weeks later, he was freed in exchange for a 300-million-lira (about US$500,000 at the time) ransom.
- At the 1973 Cannes Film Festival, the screening of La Grande Bouffe, by Marco Ferreri, a willfully provocative and extreme apologue about consumerism, infuriated some members of the crowd. The director and actors had to be escorted by the police to the hotel.
- Born:
  - Noel Fielding, British comedian, actor, and television presenter, in Westminster, London
  - Paolo Montalban, Filipino-American actor and singer, in Manila
- Died:
  - Ivan Konev, 73, Marshal of the Soviet Union who led the Red Army's counteroffensive against Nazi Germany during World War II and who was responsible for taking much of Eastern Europe into Soviet control.
  - Vaughn Monroe, 62, American bandleader and singer known for "Racing With the Moon" and "There, I've Said It Again", died from complications of stomach surgery

== May 22, 1973 (Tuesday) ==
- Lord Lambton, Undersecretary of Defence for the Royal Air Force, resigned from the British government over a 'call girl' scandal. Lord Lambton said in a handwritten statement that the call girl's husband had photographed the two of them together and tried to sell the pictures to a London tabloid, but that "There has been no security risk and no blackmail," adding "I have behaved with credulous stupidity."
- White House press secretary Ronald Ziegler delivered U.S. President Nixon's statement regarding the Watergate scandal. The president admitted that he had, on occasion, ordered wiretapping of telephones to discover the source of leaks of confidential information, as well as having created the "Plumbers" unit to stop information leaking, but denied any involvement in the installation of listening devices in Democratic Party offices in the Watergate Hotel.

== May 23, 1973 (Wednesday) ==
- Liverpool F.C. defeated Borussia Mönchengladbach 3–2 on aggregate, to win the UEFA Cup in soccer football. The first game was played at Liverpool by the English champions, who won 3–0, and were able to maintain the lead by holding Borussia to a 2–0 win in the second game, played at the Bökelbergstadion in Mönchengladbach.
- The first regular issue was published of the daily newspaper Libération, founded by existentialist Jean Paul Sartre and voice of the French far left.
- The final paintings made by Pablo Picasso, during his last two years of life, were put on exhibit for the first time, in a show at the Palace of the Popes in the French city of Avignon. In all, 201 paintings were put on display, all unsigned.

== May 24, 1973 (Thursday) ==
- Earl Jellicoe, Lord Privy Seal and Leader of the House of Lords in Britain, resigned over a separate prostitution scandal.
- Ephraim Katzir was sworn into office as the new President of Israel.
- An Indian Army brigade of 700 troops ended a three-day revolt of 300 paramilitary police in the state of Uttar Pradesh, after at least 40 people had been killed. The members of the Provincial Armed Constabulary had caused uprisings in the cities of Gorakhpur and Jahangirabad earlier in the week.
- In Athens, a mutiny of the Hellenic Navy against the Greek junta, plotted by the retired admirals Engofopulos and Minaios, was nipped in the bud by the police, who arrested the two conspirators.

Born: Dermot O'Leary, British-Irish television presenter, in Colchester, Essex, England Died: U.S. Congressman William O. Mills, 48, committed suicide with a shotgun wound to his chest, after being implicated in the Watergate scandal. Mills, of Maryland, had failed to report that he had received $25,000 from President Nixon's re-election committee. His death came the day after the Washington Post had reported the contribution, and four days after the Washington Star-News had broken the story. Before killing himself at his farm home in Easton, Maryland, Mills called a local radio station and played a recording denying that he had done anything improper.

== May 25, 1973 (Friday) ==
- The Skylab 2 space mission, with U.S. astronauts Pete Conrad, Paul J. Weitz, and Joseph P. Kerwin, was launched to repair damage to the recently launched Skylab space station. Using a vehicle and equipment from the canceled Apollo 18 mission, Skylab 2 was the first crewed space mission for the U.S. since the end of the Apollo program in 1972.

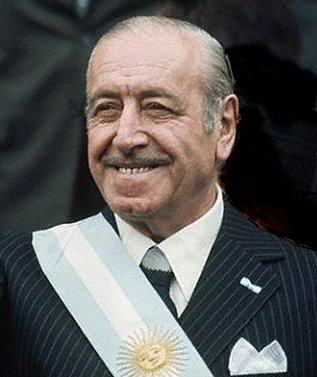
Argentine President Cámpora wearing the inaugural sash

- Héctor José Cámpora was inaugurated as President of Argentina, breaking to an end military rule that had been in place since 1966. The inauguration ceremony degenerated into a battle between police and Peronist militants, and left four people dead.
- U.S. Defense Secretary Elliot Richardson became the new U.S. Attorney General after the forced resignation of Richard Kleindienst. Bill Clements replaced Richardson as Defense Secretary.
- Claude Levi-Strauss was elected to the Académie Française, in the place of Henry de Montherlant.
- The Hireling, by Alan Bridges, and Scarecrow, by Jerry Schatzberg, won ex-aequo the Grand Prix at the 1973 Cannes Film Festival. The verdict was controversial and the president of the jury, Ingrid Bergman, was accused of favoritism for the American productions.
- Mike Oldfield's Tubular Bells became the first release on Richard Branson's newly launched Virgin label.
- Born: Demetri Martin, American comedian, director, and actor; in New York City

== May 26, 1973 (Saturday) ==
- Syria completed two days of parliamentary elections, the first in almost 10 years, as voters chose from 931 candidates for the 186 seats on the People's Council. The ruling Ba'ath Party and its allies won roughly 70 percent of the vote.
- The Cod Wars between Iceland and the UK escalated when the Icelandic Coast Guard gunboat Aegir fired shells at the British fish trawler Everton, after the fishing vessel's captain ignored several warning shots. The Everton had at least two holes in it but its crew of 21 was uninjured.
- Two days after the failed mutiny of the Hellenic Navy, the Greek destroyer Velos departed from NATO maneuvers in the Tyrrhenian Sea and dropped anchor off the coast of Fiumicino, as a protest against the Greek junta. Commander Nicholas Papas, the other officers and part of the crew received political asylum in Italy.
- Zaid Rifai was selected to be the new prime minister of Jordan by King Hussein as part of a policy to work further at ridding the Middle Eastern kingdom of Palestinian guerrillas. Rifai, who had survived a 1970 assassination attempt by Black September, replaced Ahmad Al Lawzi, who had resigned for health reasons.
- The BBC's long-running, highly rated magazine show That's Life!, introduced by Esther Rantzen, was broadcast for the first time.
- Argentina's new president Hector Campora announced a pardon for all political prisoners in the South American nation, including members of the Montoneros terrorist group. At the Villa Devoto jail, guards fired on a crowd demanding the prisoners' liberation and killed two protesters.
- A U.S. Secret Service agent was killed, and nine other persons on board a presidential helicopter were injured, when the U.S. Army Sikorsky VH-3A aircraft crashed into the Atlantic Ocean while patrolling the waters around President Nixon's vacation home at Grand Cay Island in the Bahamas. J. Clifford Dietrich was one of seven agents who had been sent from Nixon's Key Biscayne residence in Florida to replace other agents who had been on duty.
- Died: Jacques Lipchitz, 81, Latvian-born American Cubist sculptor

== May 27, 1973 (Sunday) ==
- As part of the reforms of Argentina's new civilian regime under President Campora, the Argentine Congress repealed an anti-Communist law that had been decreed on August 25, 1967, by Lieutenant General and President Juan Carlos Ongania.
- By virtue of the non-retroactivity of Soviet copyright laws, all works published in Russia and the U.S.S.R. before this date are public domain. This applies worldwide.
- Died: Herman A. Barnett, 47, American surgeon and former aviator of the Tuskegee Airmen, was killed in a plane crash.

== May 28, 1973 (Monday) ==
- The Salyut 2 space station, which had been damaged soon after being launched into orbit by the Soviet Union on April 3, 1973, fell out of orbit after 56 days and burned up in Earth's atmosphere over the south Pacific Ocean.
- The 1973 Indianapolis 500, already marked by the death of a driver in qualifications, started as scheduled on Memorial Day and soon was halted because of a pileup of 11 cars and the serious injury of Salt Walther in a fiery crash. In addition, 12 spectators received injuries after stricken by debris from the crash.

== May 29, 1973 (Tuesday) ==
- Princess Anne, the only daughter of Queen Elizabeth II of the United Kingdom, announced her engagement to Olympic equestrian champion and British Army Lieutenant. Mark Phillips.
- Los Angeles, California, became the largest U.S. city to elect an African-American mayor, as city councilman Tom Bradley defeated incumbent Sam Yorty, who had been the mayor for 12 years.
- Huang Zhen became the first diplomatic representative to the U.S. from the People's Republic of China as the liaison in Washington DC. He presented his credentials to President Nixon the next day.

== May 30, 1973 (Wednesday) ==
- The Indianapolis 500, associated with three deaths, was won by Gordon Johncock, after heavy rains had canceled the event twice. Less than an hour after the race was started at 2:10 in the afternoon, on the 59th lap, David "Swede" Savage was fatally injured in a fiery crash after losing control of his car. Armando Teran, a member of the pit crew for another driver, Graham McRae, stepped out on to the track and was killed by a truck racing to the scene of the crash. Because of the weather and delays that had prevented the race from being run on Memorial Day, attendance at the race was only 35,000. Johncock left shortly after his victory to visit Savage in the hospital. Savage would die of complications from his injuries on July 2, almost weeks after the crash.
- Sheik Mohammed Ali Othman, one of the three members of the North Yemen's ruling executive council of the Yemen Arab Republic (North Yemen), was assassinated by a group of infiltrators from the neighboring People's Democratic Republic of Yemen (South Yemen). Othman was being driven from his home in Taiz to his office and his car was "fired at by ambushers using bazookas and machine guns, who apparently came from the other side of the border", according to a statement from the Middle East News Agency.
- Erskine H. Childers, a native of Great Britain and a Protestant, was elected as the new President of Ireland, defeating Tom O'Higgins.
- Local elections were held in Northern Ireland, part of the UK, with results decided for the first time by proportional representation, using the single transferable vote system.

== May 31, 1973 (Thursday) ==
- The crash of Indian Airlines Flight 440 killed 48 of the 65 passengers and crew on board, as the Boeing 737 approached Delhi's Palam Airport for a landing following its departure from Madras. Making its descent, the aircraft collided with high tension wires 4 miles (6.4 km) from its destination. The dead included India's Minister of Iron and Steel Mines, Mohan Kumaramangalam.
