= Bumbobi–Bubulo–Lwakhakha Road =

Ugandan road

Coordinates: 00°57′03″N 34°16′17″E

Route information
- Length: 28 mi (45 km)
- History: Designation in 2016; Completion in 2020

Major junctions
- West end: Bumbobi
- Nabumali
- East end: Lwakhakha

Location
- Country: Uganda

Highway system
- Roads in Uganda

Bumbobi–Bubulo–Lwakhakha Road is a road in the Eastern Region of Uganda, connecting the city of Mbale to the town of Lwakhakha at the International border with Kenya.

== Location ==
The road starts at Bumbobi, a suburb of the city of Mbale (2014 population: 92,857), the most populous city in Uganda's Eastern Region. The road continues through Nabumali and Bubulo to end at Lwakhakha, a total distance of about 46 kilometres (29 mi). The road connects Manafwa District to Mbale, the largest city in the Bugisu sub-region.

== Upgrading to bitumen ==
The government of Uganda requested funding from the African Development Bank (ADB) to upgrade this road from gravel surface to class 2 bitumen surface. As required by Ugandan law and ADB guidelines, an environment assessment study was commissioned and its report published in 2013. Construction was expected to start once funding was approved and a contractor was selected and hired. As of November 2014, project preparation was ongoing.

== Construction ==
The construction contract was awarded to China State Construction Engineering Corporation (CSCEC), at a contract price of UGX:153.105 billion (approx. US$42 million). The engineering consultant was SGI Joint Venture. The civil works contract was signed on 26 September 2016. Permission to start work was granted in December 2016. Expected completion was in August 2019. Te project was jointly funded by the African Development Bank and the government of Uganda. As of July 2020, completion was anticipated in September 2020. In December 2020, the completed road was commissioned by Yoweri Museveni, the president of Uganda at that time.

== See also ==
- Mbale District
- List of roads in Uganda
- Economy of Uganda
- Transport in Uganda
