= 1973 Swiss referendums =

Eight referendums were held in Switzerland in 1973. The first two were held on 4 March on amendments to the Swiss Federal Constitution on education and promoting research. Whilst the education proposal was approved by a majority of voters, it failed to receive the support of a majority of cantons. The research proposal was approved by both. The third referendum was held on 20 May on another constitutional amendment, removing articles 51 and 52 regarding Jesuits and cloisters, and was approved.

The final five referendums were held on 2 December on price controls, the credit system, measures to stabilise the construction market, a reversal of the income tax write-off and a constitutional amendment regarding the protection of animals, all of which were approved.

== Results ==
=== 4 March: Constitutional amendment on education ===
Choice	Popular vote		Cantons		
Choice	Votes	%	Full	Half	Total
For	507,414	52.8	9	3	10.5
Against	454,428	47.2	10	3	11.5
Blank votes	35,349	–	–	–	–
Invalid votes	2,111	–	–	–	–
Total	999,302	100	19	6	22
Registered voters/turnout	3,633,517	27.5	–	–	–
Source: Nohlen & Stöver

=== 4 March: Constitutional amendment on promoting research ===
Choice	Popular vote		Cantons		
Choice	Votes	%	Full	Half	Total
For	617,628	64.5	17	4	19
Against	339,857	35.5	2	2	3
Blank votes	39,922	–	–	–	–
Invalid votes	2,090	–	–	–	–
Total	999,497	100	19	6	22
Registered voters/turnout	3,633,517	27.5	–	–	–
Source: Nohlen & Stöver

=== 20 May: Constitutional amendment on Jesuits and cloisters ===
Choice	Popular vote		Cantons		
Choice	Votes	%	Full	Half	Total
For	791,076	54.9	14	5	16.5
Against	648,924	45.1	5	1	5.5
Blank votes	25,051	–	–	–	–
Invalid votes	2,443	–	–	–	–
Total	1,467,494	100	19	6	22
Registered voters/turnout	3,642,756	40.3	–	–	–
Source: Nohlen & Stöver

=== 2 December: Price controls ===
Choice	Popular vote		Cantons		
Choice	Votes	%	Full	Half	Total
For	751,173	59.8	17	6	20
Against	505,843	40.2	2	0	2
Blank votes	25,082	–	–	–	–
Invalid votes	1,701	–	–	–	–
Total	1,283,799	100	19	6	22
Registered voters/turnout	3,665,107	35.0	–	–	–
Source: Nohlen & Stöver

=== 2 December: Credit system ===
Choice	Votes	%
For	810,307	65.1
Against	434,045	34.9
Blank votes	36,398	–
Invalid votes	1,811	–
Total	1,282,565	100
Registered voters/turnout	3,655,107	35.0
Source: Nohlen & Stöver

=== 2 December: Construction market ===
Choice	Popular vote		Cantons		
Choice	Votes	%	Full	Half	Total
For	881,662	70.4	17	6	20
Against	370,843	29.6	2	0	2
Blank votes	28,991	–	–	–	–
Invalid votes	1,745	–	–	–	–
Total	1,283,243	100	19	6	22
Registered voters/turnout	3,665,107	35.0	–	–	–
Source: Nohlen & Stöver

=== 2 December: Income tax write-off ===
Choice	Popular vote		Cantons		
Choice	Votes	%	Full	Half	Total
For	834,792	68.0	17	5	19.5
Against	391,956	32.0	2	1	2.5
Blank votes	52,321	–	–	–	–
Invalid votes	1,918	–	–	–	–
Total	1,280,985	100	19	6	22
Registered voters/turnout	3,665,107	35.0	–	–	–
Source: Nohlen & Stöver

=== 2 December: Constitutional amendment on animal protection ===
Choice	Popular vote		Cantons		
Choice	Votes	%	Full	Half	Total
For	1,041,504	84.0	19	6	22
Against	199,090	16.0	0	0	0
Blank votes	39,855	–	–	–	–
Invalid votes	1,959	–	–	–	–
Total	1,282,410	100	19	6	22
Registered voters/turnout	3,665,107	35.0	–	–	–
Source: Nohlen & Stöver
