= Lwakhakha, Kenya =

- Location in Kenya
- Coordinates: 00°47′24″N 34°22′48″E
- Country: Kenya
- County: Bungoma County
- Elevation: 4,400 ft (1,340 m)

Lwakhakha, sometimes spelled Lwakaka, is a town in Bungoma County, Kenya.

== Location ==
Lwakhaka, Kenya is located in Bungoma County, approximately 90 kilometres (56 mi), by road, southwest of Kitale. Lwakhakha also lies approximately 275 kilometres (171 mi), by road, northwest of Nakuru, the largest city in the province. This location is immediately east of Lwakhakha, Uganda, across the International border that divides the two towns. The coordinates of Lwakhakha, Kenya are:0° 47' 24.00"N, 34° 22' 48.00"E (Latitude:0.7900; Longitude:34.3800).

== Overview ==
Lwakhakha, Kenya is a market town. Trans-border trade occurs, but much of it is informal and goes unrecorded. The town is connected to Kenya's national electricity grid. Arrangements are in the advanced stages to supply electricity to Lwakhakha, Uganda from Kenya, under the auspices of the East African Community. The area around Lwakhakha, Kenya has, in the past, served as a base for rebels opposed to the Kenyan Government in Nairobi.

== Population ==
As of July 2011, the population of Lwakhakha, Kenya is not publicly known.

== See also ==
- Lwakhakha, Uganda
