= Dhirendra Verma =

Indian poet and writer (1897–1973)

- Born: 17 May 1897; Bareilly, North-Western Provinces, British India
- Died: 23 April 1973 (aged 75)
- Occupations: poet, writer

Dhirendra Verma (17 May 1897 – 23 April 1973) was an Indian poet and writer. He used to write in Hindi and Brij Bhasha. Verma holds the same prominence for introducing scientific methods to research in Hindi language and literature as does Ramchandra Shukla. On the basis of his research in Indian languages, he published the first scientific history of Indian languages in 1933. He wrote his doctoral thesis on Brij Bhasha in French which was later translated into Hindi.

== Life ==
Verma was born on 17 May 1897 in Bhui colony of Bareilly in Uttar Pradesh, India. His father, Khanchand, was a Jamindar by birth and occupation. Khanchand had deep interest in Indian culture and was influenced by the ideals of Arya Samaj. Verma was significantly influenced by his father and the ideals of Arya Samaj in his formative years.

Verma died on 23 April 1973.

== Education ==
Verma was admitted to D.A.V. College, Dehradun in 1908. However, he soon returned to his father and took admission in Queen's College, Lucknow. He passed the "School Leaving Certificate Examination" with first division with special honours in Hindi. Subsequently, he went to Myor Central College, Allahabad where he received his M.A. in Sanskrit (1921) from. Later, he was awarded a D. Litt degree from Paris University.

== Teacher and researcher ==
Verma was appointed as the first lecturer of Hindi language at Allahabad University in 1924. Subsequently, he was promoted as a Professor and then Head of Department of Hindi department at Allahabad University, which he headed for several years. Later on, he served as the Vice Chancellor of Sagar University in Madhya Pradesh.

It was his stint as a teacher and researcher that brought a lot of fame for Verma. He is recognized as the pioneer in introducing scientific methods to research in Hindi language and literature.

Verma is known to have mentored many prominent writers, among them Dharamvir Bharati, who edited the Hindi magazine Dharmyug.

== Works ==
Along with Rahul Sankrityayan, Dhirendra Verma represented the spatial and temporal dimensions of Akshayat.

Considered knowledgeable on Hindi literature, Verma has written many books. Notable among them in Hindi are Hindi-Rashtra ya Suba Hindustan (1930) Hindi Bhasha ka Itihasa ( History of Hindi language ) (1933). Notable books written by Verma in Brij Bhasha are Brij Chhap- Grammar of Brij Bhasha, Ashtchhap, Sursagar Saar, etc. Also he wrote books on rural Hindi.

Verma was the principal editor of the first 'हिन्दी विश्वकोश' (Hindi Encyclopedia).

Verma maintained a diary during his student years in 1917–23 about the political events taking place in India then. The diary entries were published in four parts called Meri kalej dayari (My College Diary).

Father Kamil Bulke, the Belgian Jesuit, who later became famous as India's most famous Christian Hindi scholar, wrote that it was on the inspiration of Verma that he went to Allahabad in 1945 and did research in Hindi for four years.

=== Partial bibliography ===
Book	Brief summary
'ब्रजभाषा व्याकरण' (Brijbhadha Vyakaran)	Published by Ramnarayan Lal, Allahabad, 1937
'अष्टछाप' (Ashtachhap)	Published by Ramnarayan Lal, Allahabad, 1938
'सूरसागर-सार' (Sursagar Saar)	Selection and editing of 817 couplets of Surdas. Published by Sahitya Bhavan Limited, Allahabad, 1954
'मेरी कालिज डायरी' (My College Diary)	Book form of diary kept in student life between 1917 and 1923., Published by Sahitya Bhavan Limited, Allahabad, 1954
'ब्रजभाषा' (Brij Bhasha)	Book from the thesis, originally written and published in French. Published by Hindustani Academy, 1957
'हिन्दी साहित्य कोश' (Hindi Sahitya Kosh)	Editor. Published by Jnanamandal Limited, Varanasi, 1958
'हिन्दी साहित्य' (Hindi Sahitya)	Editor. Published by Bhartiya Hindi Parishad, 1959
'कम्पनी के पत्र' (Company Ke Patra)	Editor. Published by Allahabad University, 1959
'मध्यदेश' (Madhyadesh)	Book on Indian culture. Edited form of lectures delivered under the aegis of Bihar Rashtrabhasha Parishad. Published by Bihar Rashtrabhasha Parishad, Patna, 1955
'हिन्दी राष्ट्र' (Hindi Rashtra)	Published by Bharti Bhandar, Leader Press, Allahabad
'विचार धारा' (Vichar Dhara)	Collection of essays. Published by Sahitya Bhavan Limited, Allahabad
'ग्रामीण हिन्दी' (Grameen Hindi)	Published by Sahitya Bhavan Limited, Allahabad
'यूरोप के पत्र' (Europe Ke Patra)	Letters written during Verma's stay in Europe. Published by Sahitya Bhavan Limited, Allahabad
