= Lwakhakha, Uganda =

- Map of Uganda showing the location of Lwakhakha
- Coordinates: 00°47′48″N 34°22′41″E
- Country: Uganda
- Region: Eastern Region of Uganda
- Sub-region: Bugisu sub-region
- District: Manafwa District
- Elevation: 1,400 m (4,600 ft)

Population (2011 Estimate)
  - Total: 10,700
- Time zone: UTC+3 (EAT)

Lwakhakha is a town in the Eastern Region of Uganda. It is one of the municipal centers in Manafwa District. The town lies across the international border from Lwakhakha, Kenya.

== Location ==
Lwakhakha is approximately 55 kilometres (34 mi), by road, southeast of Mbale, the nearest large city. This is approximately 19 kilometres (12 mi), by road, southeast of Manafwa, the site of the district headquarters. The coordinates of Lwakhakha, Uganda are 0°47'48.0"N, 34°22'41.0"E (Latitude:0.796667; Longitude:34.378056).

== Population ==
During the 2002 national census, the population of Lwakhakha was enumerated at 7,916. In 2010, the Uganda Bureau of Statistics (UBOS) estimated the population at 10,400. In 2011, UBOS estimated the mid-year population to be 10,700.

== Notable people ==
- Amos Masaba Wekesa, the founder, proprietor and managing director of Great Lakes Safaris Limited, was born here in 1973.

== Landmarks ==
Landmarks in Lwakhakha include the following:

- offices of Lwakhakha Town Council
- Lwakhakha central market
- Bumbobi–Bubulo–Lwakhakha Road
- Embassy Villas Hotel in Lwakhakha town council

== Developments ==
In August 2023, The EastAfrican reported that the Kenyan and Ugandan governments were planning to develop one-stop border posts at Lwakhakha, to supplement those at Busia, Malaba and Suam.

== See also ==
- List of cities and towns in Uganda
