= Shakila Rahim Lamar =

Ugandan businesswoman and corporate executive

- Born: c. 1983 (age 42–43); Uganda
- Education: Law Development Centre (Diploma in Law); Eastern and Southern African Management Institute (Executive Masters of Business Administration; Chartered Institute of Public Relations, (Associate Member)
- Occupations: Businesswoman, Public Relations Professional & Corporate Executive
- Years active: since 2005
- Known for: Professional competence
- Title: Acting Chief commercial officer at Uganda Airlines

Shakila Rahim Lamar, is a Ugandan businesswoman, public relations professional and corporate executive who is the Chief commercial officer (CCO) in acting capacity at Uganda Airlines, the national carrier of that country, since March 2026. Before that, from December 2021 until March 2026, she served as Head of Public Relations and Corporate Affairs at the same airline. Prior to joining Uganda Airlines, she was the Head of Corporate Communications at Uganda Road Fund.

== Background and education ==
Lamar is a Ugandan national. She holds a Diploma in Law, awarded by the Law Development Centre, in Kampala. She also holds an Executive Master of Business Administration, awarded by the Eastern and Southern African Management Institute (EASAMI). In addition she is an Associate Member of the Chartered Institute of Public Relations (CIPR).

== Career ==
At the time she took up employment at Uganda Airlines in December 2021, she had over 16 years of experience including the areas of "leadership, customer care, government relations, risk management, media relations, corporate communications, and crisis communication". In addition to her work at the Uganda Road Fund, she previously worked in the same role in one of the agencies of the Uganda Ministry of Agriculture.

She is one the executives hired by the national airline during the clean-up and revamp of UR in 2022, following the assumption of the helm as CEO, by Jenifer Bamuturaki. Following the departure of the previous COO Adedayo Olawuyi in March 2026, Shakila Rahim Lamar was appointed in acting capacity, to replace him.

== See also ==
- Adedayo Olawuyi
