= Amos Wekesa =

Ugandan entrepreneur

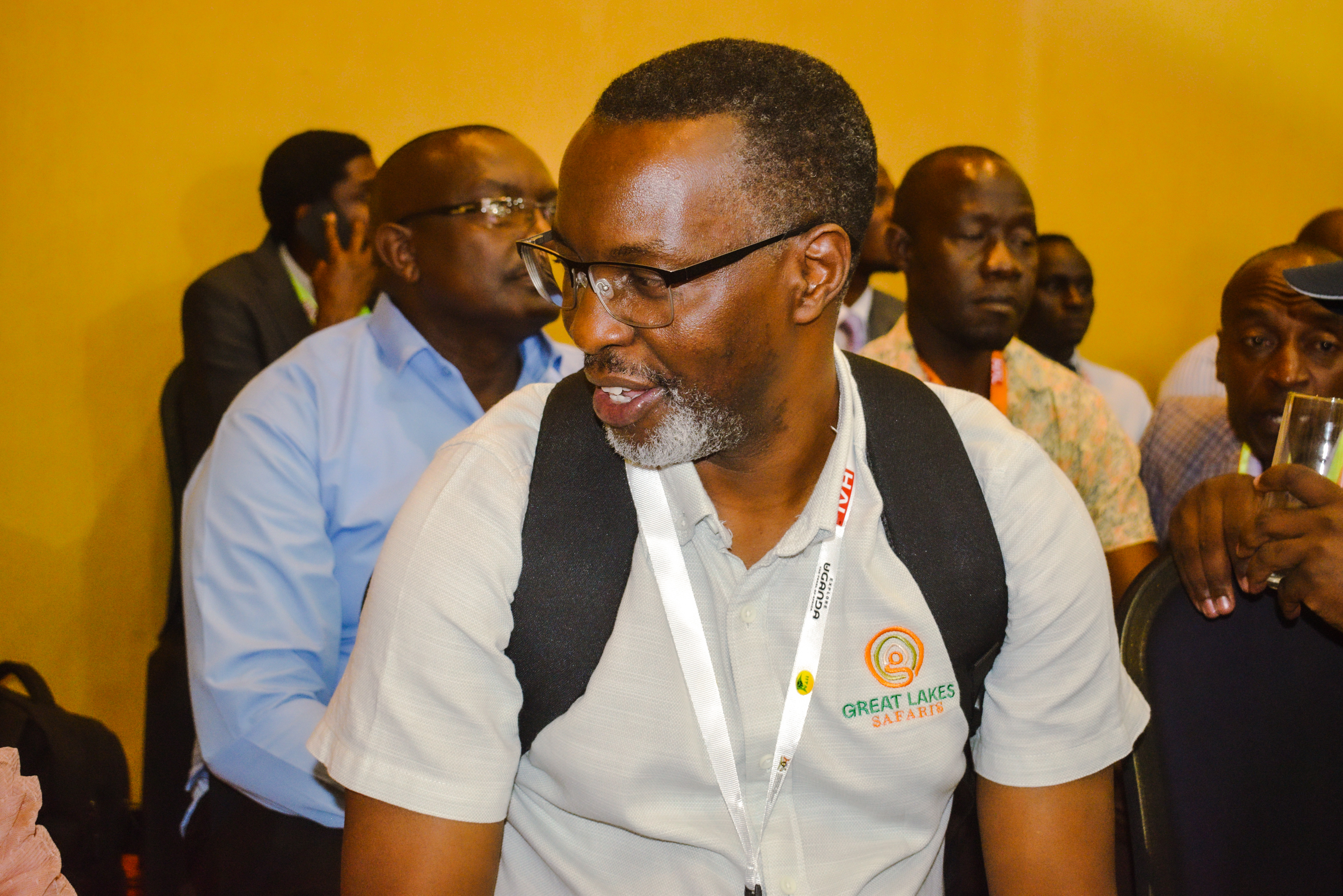
- Amos Wekesa at the Pearl of Africa Tourism Expo 2025 hosted at Speke Resort and Convention Center Munyonyo
- Born: 22 April 1973 (age 53); Lwakhakha, Namisindwa District, Uganda
- Education: Wairaka College (Uganda Certificate of Education); St. Peter's College Tororo (Uganda Advanced Certificate of Education); Tourism School in Kampala (Certificate in Tourism)
- Occupations: Businessman, entrepreneur and corporate executive
- Years active: 2001–present
- Known for: Great Lakes Safaris Limited
- Title: Founder, proprietor and managing director
- Spouse: Amy Wekesa

Amos Masaba Wekesa, is a businessman, entrepreneur and corporate executive in Uganda, who is the founder, proprietor and managing director of Great Lakes Safaris Limited, a tour operating company, in the African Great Lakes region. His conglomerate of related tour businesses grosses an estimated US$8 million annually, and employs in excess of 250 people.

== Background and education ==
Wekesa was born on 22 April 1973, in Lwakhakha, Uganda, a border town at the international border with Kenya. His family was of very modest means.

When he was ten years old, missionaries from the Salvation Army came and offered him sponsorship to elementary school. He transferred to the town of Tororo, where he completed his elementary school, under sponsorship from the Salvation Army.

He went on to complete his O-Level education at Wairaka College, in Wairaka, Jinja District. He then transferred to St. Peter's College Tororo, where he completed his A-Level studies. He then studied at a tourism school in Kampala, Uganda's capital city, graduating with a Certificate in Tourism, nine months later.

== Career ==
From 1997 until 2001, he worked in four different tour operating companies as a lowly-paid office employee. In 2001, with US$200 in savings, without a motor vehicle and with his office underneath a staircase, in Kampala, Amos Wekesa founded Great Lakes Safaris Limited. His other investments include Uganda Lodges Limited, a collection of four unique eco-friendly safari facilities: (a) Simba Safari Camp Limited in Queen Elizabeth National Park (QENP) (b) Elephant Plains Limited in QENP (c) Primate Lodge Limited in Kibaale National Park and (d) Budongo Eco Lodge Limited in Murchison Falls National Park.

== Family ==
Amos Wekesa is married to Amy Wekesa and has three children.

== See also ==
- Lilly Ajarova
- Tourism in Uganda
- List of protected areas of Uganda
