= June 1973 =

Month of 1973

<<	June 1973					>>
Su	Mo	Tu	We	Th	Fr	Sa
					1	2
3	4	5	6	7	8	9
10	11	12	13	14	15	16
17	18	19	20	21	22	23
24	25	26	27	28	29	30

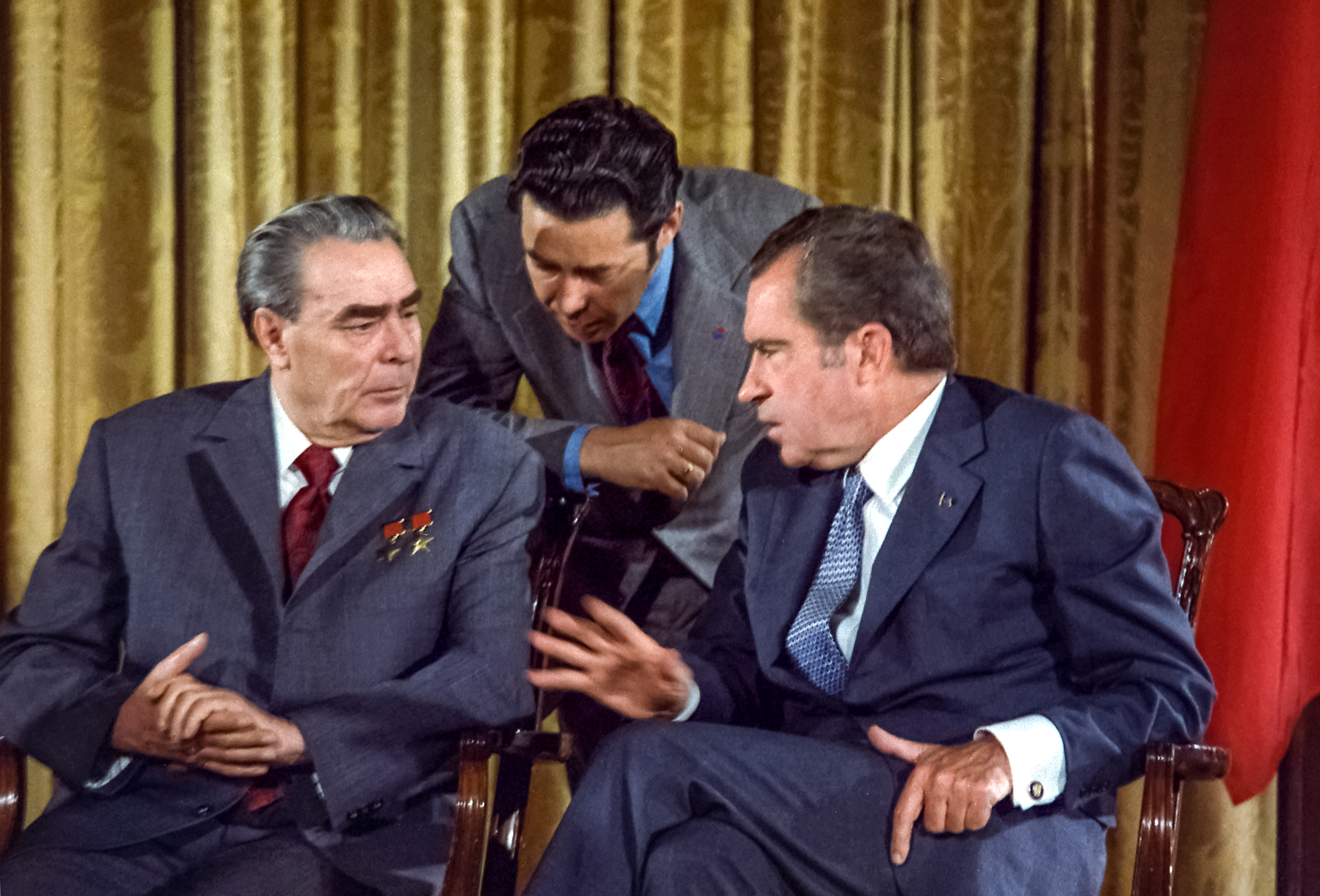
June 18, 1973: Soviet leader Leonid Brezhnev meets with and U.S. President Richard Nixon at the White House (pictured, interpreter Viktor Sukhodrev

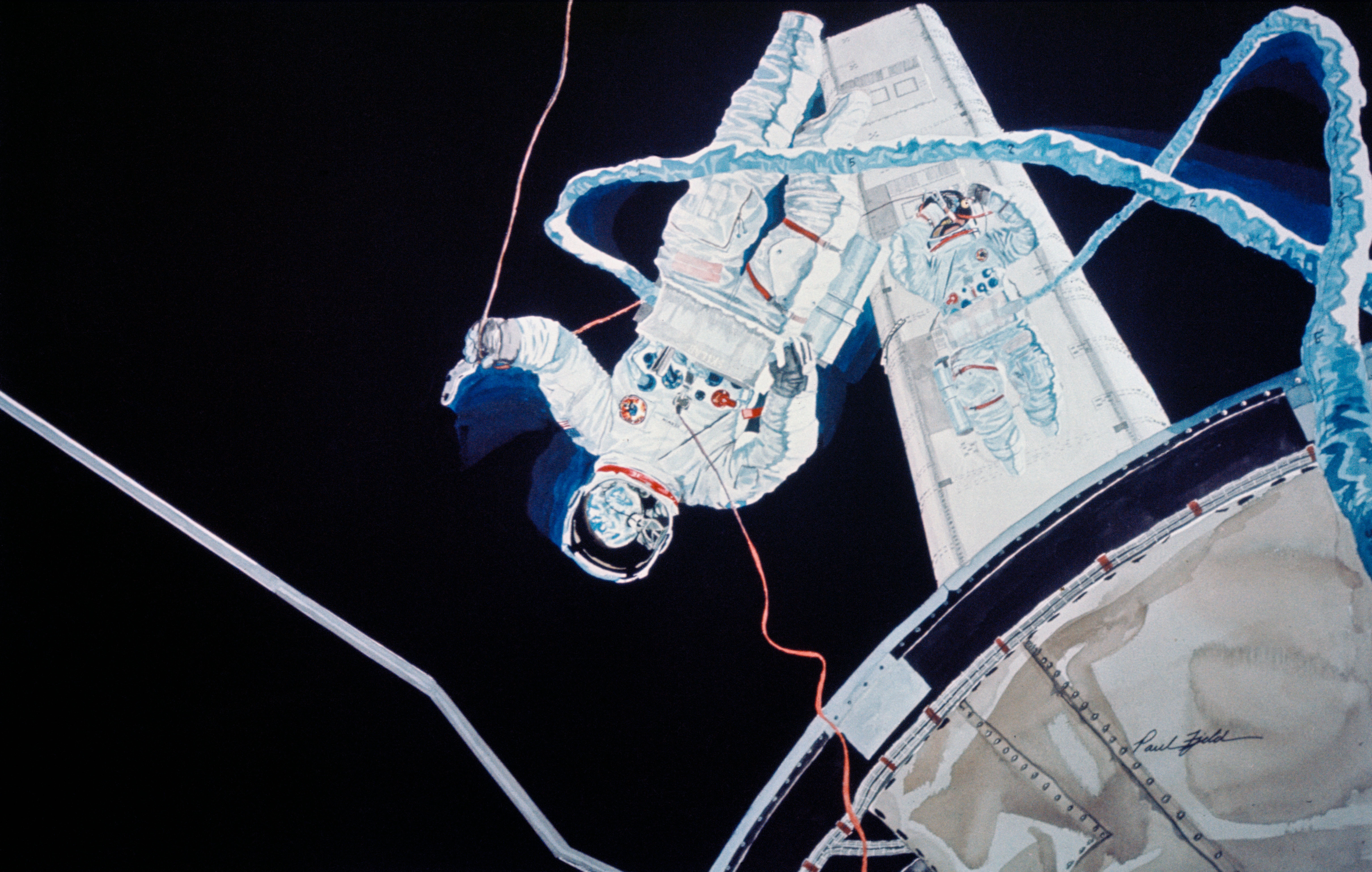
June 7, 1973: Astronauts Kerwin and Conrad are thrown from Skylab's hull, but their cords withstand the force of each astronaut's mass and prevent them from drifting into space.

The following events occurred in June 1973:

== June 1, 1973 (Friday) ==
- General Georgios Papadopoulos, who had served as Prime Minister of Greece since shortly after leading the overthrow of the government on April 21, 1967, proclaimed the abolition of the monarchy of Greece and the establishment of a republic with himself as President.
- All 23 people on Cruzeiro do Sul Flight 109 were killed in Brazil when the Caravelle SE-210 jet crashed during its approach to São Luíz on a flight from Belém.
- The colony of British Honduras in Central America was renamed Belize in anticipation of eventual independence from the United Kingdom, which would take place in 1981.
- The U.S. town of Haw River, North Carolina, was incorporated.
- Born: Heidi Klum, German model and actress; in Bergisch Gladbach, West Germany
- Died:
  - Harvey S. Firestone Jr., 75, American businessman who developed the Firestone Tire and Rubber Company into an international manufacturer and seller of tires.
  - Father Joseph André, 65, Belgian Roman Catholic priest who rescued numerous Jewish children during the Nazi occupation in World War II.
  - Mary Kornman, 57, American child actress in the early Our Gang installments during the 1920s, died of cancer.

== June 2, 1973 (Saturday) ==
- Fifteen people died when the supertanker Esso Brussels was struck by the container ship Sea Witch in New York Harbor. The oil tanker ship fire killed 13 crew, and two crew were lost from the container ship.
- The Semaphore state by-election for the South Australian House of Assembly, caused by the death of Reginald Hurst, was won by the Australian Labor Party, with 71.9% of the vote.
- Born:
  - Carlos Acosta, Cuban ballet dancer; in Havana
  - Antonín Brabec, Czech Repbulci rugby union centre with 42 appearances for the national team; in Prague, Czechoslovakia
- Died: U.S. Army Lieutenant Colonel Lewis Lee Hawkins, 42, the deputy chief of the U.S. military advisory group to the Iranian Armed Forces, was shot to death by terrorists while in Tehran.

== June 3, 1973 (Sunday) ==
- Russia's supersonic aircraft crashed at the Paris air show in front of 250,000 people, including designer Alexei Tupolev. All six people on board the Tupolev Tu-144 died, and eight more were killed when the airplane debris destroyed 15 houses in the village of Goussainville. Another 60 people on the ground were severely injured. The Tu-144 had been heavily modified compared to the initial prototype, featuring engine nacelles split on either side of the fuselage, landing gear that retracted into the nacelles, and retractable foreplanes. After passing over the runway at Le Bourget Airport, the jet made a steep climb and the engines failed at 2,000 ft (610 m). As the aircraft pitched over and went into a steep dive, the crew's attempt to pull up overstressed the airfame and the Tu-144 broke up in mid-air, destroying 15 houses in Goussainville.
- Israel and Syria repatriated several prisoners of war, with Syria releasing three Israeli Air Force pilots in exchange for 47 Syrian and 10 Lebanese POWs, including five high ranking Syrian officers and a former Syrian parliament member who had been in prison for espionage.
- The championship of Bulgarian soccer football's "Cup of the Soviet Army" tournament was played in Sofia, with CSKA Sofia (the Bulgarian Army's team) defeating Beroe Stara Zagora, 2 to 1.
- Born: Thérèse Kirongozi, Congolese engineer who designed the "traffic robots" unique to cities in the Democratic Republic of Congo (formerly Zaire) since 2013; in Kinshasa, Zaire

== June 4, 1973 (Monday) ==
- A United States patent for the first automated teller machine, the Docutel, was granted to Donald Wetzel, Tom Barnes and George Chastain.
- Died: Murry Wilson, 55, American music publisher who was the initial manager of The Beach Boys rock music group as father of Brian Wilson, Dennis Wilson, and Carl Wilson, died of a heart attack. The three Wilson sons fired their father as manager in 1964, but Murry Wilson controlled their publishing company, Sea of Tunes, until selling it in 1969.

== June 5, 1973 (Tuesday) ==
- On his CFRB show in Toronto, Canadian radio commentator Gordon Sinclair delivered an editorial, "The Americans", that would become popular in North America, with two different versions becoming a "Top 40" hit on Billboard magazine's "Hot 100" after background music was added. The more popular of the two, recorded by Byron MacGregor of CKLW radio in Windsor, Ontario, would reach #4 on Billboard in 1974.
- The Soviet satellite Kosmos 562 was successfully launched into low Earth orbit at 11:29:47 GMT, from Site 133/1 at the Plesetsk Cosmodrome,
- Born:
  - Galilea Montijo, Mexican host of the Televisa talk show Hoy and the talent show Pequeños Gigantes; in Guadalajara
  - Filipe Duarte (stage name for Luís Filipe Duarte Ferreira da Silva), Angolan-born Portuguese film and TV actor; in Nova Lisboa (died of a heart attack, 2020)

== June 6, 1973 (Wednesday) ==
- West Germany's President Gustav Heinemann signed a treaty with East Germany, despite a legal challenge by the state of Bavaria to the constitutionality of the treaty. West Germany's Constitutional Court rejected the Bavarian challenge, and the treaty took effect on June 21.
- The first Polski Fiat 126p was constructed from Italian parts. The official price was 69,000 Polish złotys with PKO Bank Polski accepting pre-payments on savings books starting 5 February 1973.
- Born: Ahmad Al Shugairi, Saudi Arabian activist and media figure; in Jeddah
- Died: Jimmy Clitheroe, 51, English entertainer, after having taken an overdose of sleeping pills on the day of his mother's funeral.

== June 7, 1973 (Thursday) ==
- During a spacewalk from the Skylab space station, Skylab 2 astronauts Pete Conrad and Joseph P. Kerwin successfully freed the station's one remaining solar panel, stuck closed since the station was damaged during launch on May 14. When the stuck solar panel was released, both Conrad and Kerwin were flung off of Skylab's hull, but their EVA umbilicals kept them from drifting into space.

== June 8, 1973 (Friday) ==
- Major B. Coxson of the Black Mafia, a drug kingpin in the U.S. city of Philadelphia and a former candidate for mayor of Camden, New Jersey, was shot along with his son, his girlfriend, and her daughter by four men whom he let into his home in Cherry Hill, New Jersey, in a crime that was never solved. Coxson and the daughter, Lita Luby, died of their wounds.
- The owner of baseball's San Diego Padres, C. Arnholt Smith, confirmed that as part of his sale of the National League team and that the team would be moved to Washington D.C. Smith gave notice to the San Diego city council in a letter. The move never took place, and the Padres would still be in San Diego fifty years later. Smith had sold the team to Joseph Danzansky and two other Washington businessmen on May 28.
- Born: Lexa Doig, Canadian TV and film actress known for the science fiction show Andromeda and as a co-star on The Aurora Teagarden Mysteries, as well as the film Halloween: Jason X; in Toronto
- Died:
  - Emmy Göring, 80, German actress and widow of Hermann Göring
  - Marjery Bryce, 81, British suffragette

== June 9, 1973 (Saturday) ==
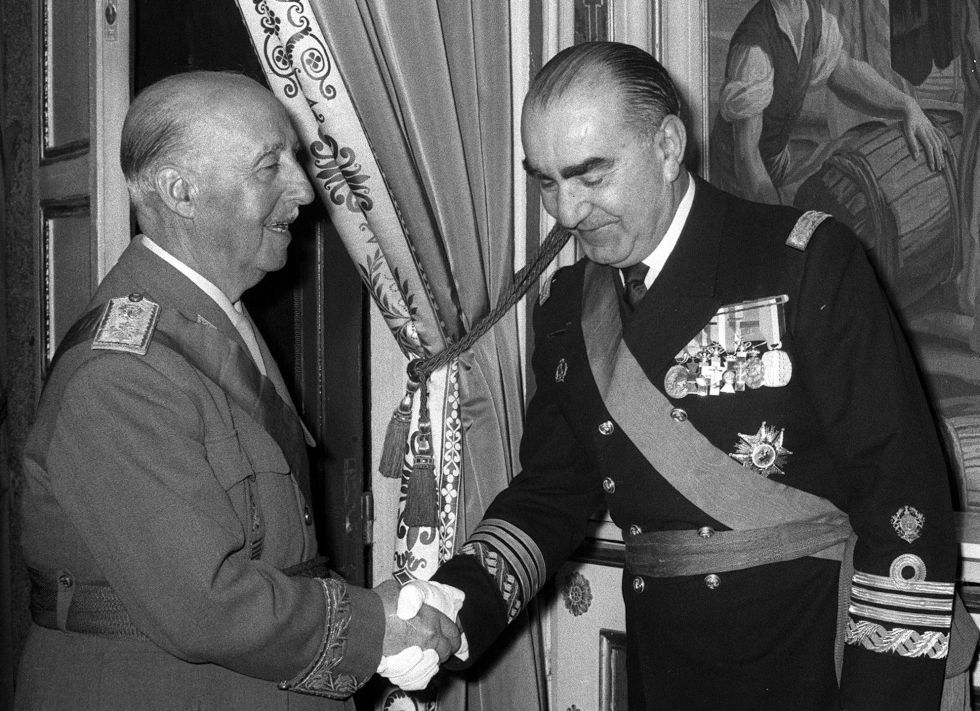
Generalissimo Franco and Admiral Carrero

- Spanish Navy Admiral Luis Carrero Blanco became Prime Minister of Spain as Spain's dictator and head of state Francisco Franco relinquished the day-to-day management of the cabinet of ministers. Admiral Carrero would hold the post for only six months before his assassination by Basque terrorists on December 20.
- Secretariat won the Belmont Stakes, becoming the first U.S. Triple Crown of Thoroughbred Racing winner since 1948.
- The 1973 Giro d'Italia cycle race was won by Eddy Merckx.
- The 1972–73 Fußball-Bundesliga season ended in West Germany, with defending champions FC Bayern Munich repeating with a first place finish (25 wins, 4 draws, 5 losses) well ahead of 1. FC Köln (16 wins, 11 draws).
- Died:
  - John Creasey, 64, English mystery novelist
  - Janice Marie Young, 15, American teenager and runaway, was killed after being pushed in front of a moving truck. Designated as a "Jane Doe" by police in St. Petersburg, Florida, she would remain unidentified for almost 42 years until facial reconstruction photography and DNA testing of a sibling would confirm her identity.

== June 10, 1973 (Sunday) ==
- Explorer 49 was launched as the last American space probe, for more than 20 years, to orbit the Moon. The U.S. would not send another probe to the Moon until the launch of Clementine on January 25, 1994.
- Born:
  - Faith Evans, American singer-songwriter, record producer, occasional actress and author; in Lakeland, Florida
  - Sarah-Jayne Mulvihill, British servicewoman, the first to be killed in action for 22 years (died 2006 in Iraq)
- Died:
  - William Inge, 60, American playwright and screenwriter, committed suicide. Inge won a Pulitzer Prize in 1953 for the play Picnic, and an Academy Award for best screen play for Splendor in the Grass.
  - Erich von Manstein, 85, Nazi German field marshal and convicted war criminal who developed the blitzkrieg system for massive invasions in warfare

== June 11, 1973 (Monday) ==
- Libya's leader, Muammar Gaddafi, announced the nationalization of U.S. multimillionaire Nelson Bunker Hunt's oil company in the North African nation, giving Libya full control of the Sareer oilfield that had once been owned by Hunt and by British Petroleum. In a speech, Khadafy said "The time has come for us to deal America a strong slap on its cool arrogant face," and added "The right to nationalize comes under our sovereignty over our land. We can do whatever we want with our oil." As one author would note later, the action against Hunt "demoted him from wealthiest man in the world to an ordinary multimillionaire, restoring his status as a rich man's son rather than wealthy in his own right."
- Diplocardia meansi, also known as "Means's Giant Earthworm" (because of its 18-inch (460 mm) length), was discovered by D. Bruce Means in Polk County, Arkansas.
- Died:
  - Sean Kenny, 43, Irish theatre designer, died of a brain hemorrhage.
  - Lawson H. M. Sanderson, 77, U.S. Marine Corps Major General who developed the aerial technique of dive bombing

== June 12, 1973 (Tuesday) ==
- Six people were killed and 33 injured by a terrorist car bomb after the Provisional IRA had placed a time bomb in an automobile parked on a busy street in the Northern Ireland town of Coleraine in County Londonderry. All of the dead were retired Protestants ranging in age from 60 to 76, and several of the injured survived with lost limbs or crippling injuries. A second time bomb exploded five minutes later, but caused no injuries.
- Italy's Prime Minister Giulio Andreotti and his cabinet of ministers announced their resignations after their coalition fell apart. Mariano Rumor would form a new government on July 8.
- Three weeks of voting in the Solomon Islands were completed with a choice of 118 candidates competing for 24 available seats of the 33-seat Governing Council of the British protectorate. The Solomons would become an independent nation on July 7, 1978.
- Film actor Marlon Brando punched controversial celebrity photographer Ron Galella after the paparazzo had followed Brando and talk show host Dick Cavett to a restaurant. Galella's jaw was broken and he had five teeth knocked out; Galella had already been in the news for having a restraining order against him against close pursuit of Jacqueline Onassis.
- Born: Alyson Annan, Australian women's field hockey player who led the national team to two Olympic gold medals (1996 and 2000) and six world championships between 1993 and 1999, and was later the head coach of the Netherlands team; in Wentworthville, New South Wales

== June 13, 1973 (Wednesday) ==
- The collision of the Soviet Navy submarine K-56 killed 27 people after it moved into the path of a research vessel, the Academician Berg in the Petra Velikogo Gulf of the Sea of Japan. Those killed (16 officers, five warrant officers, five sailors and a civilian observer) died from chlorine gas that filled a compartment. The crew was able to steer K-56 to a sandbar, where the survivors were rescued.
- U.S. President Richard Nixon ordered a 60-day freeze on prices for all groceries and for gasoline, to be increased to no more than the price they were on June 8. The measures were the last under "Phase III" of his price control measures authorized under the Economic Stabilization Act of 1970. Prices were allowed to rise again at 12:01 a.m. on August 13 with the beginning of "Phase IV".
- The USC Trojans baseball team won the College World Series in Omaha, Nebraska, by a 4-3 score over the Arizona State Sun Devils.
- Died: Viriato da Cruz, 55, Angolan poet and author of the MPLA manifesto, died in exile in Beijing in the People's Republic of China

== June 14, 1973 (Thursday) ==
- Connecticut became the first U.S. state to recognize Martin Luther King Jr.'s birthday as a state holiday as Governor Thomas Meskill signed a bill that had passed the state House of Representatives 124 to 17 and the state Senate unanimously. The law set aside the second Sunday in January, normally not a workday for most state employees, as the day of celebration.
- Amin al-Hafez announced his resignation as Prime Minister of Lebanon after only seven weeks in office, after criticism that he wasn't providing enough government positions for the nation's Sunni Muslims, as well as the resignation of several members of his cabinet. He would remain until a Sunni politician, Takieddin el-Solh, was able to form a new government.
- Born: Ceca (stage name for Svetlana Veličković Ražnatović), popular Serbian folk singer and TV personality; in Prokuplje, SR Serbia, Yugoslavia

== June 15, 1973 (Friday) ==
- The "Common Declaration on the Access of the Comoros to Independence", referred to as theAccords du 15 Juin 1973, was signed in Paris by representatives of the French government and by Chief Minister Ahmed Abdallah of the Comoro Islands, a French colony off of the coast of Africa, providing for independence within the next five years. With the exception of one of the islands, Mayotte, the Comoros would become independent on July 6, 1975, following a referendum on December 22, 1974.
- The Soviet Union successfully launched an uncrewed Soyuz spacecraft into orbit, then brought it back to Earth two days later, designating it as Kosmos 573 to disguise its purpose. The Soyuz craft was not docked to the orbiting Salyut space station, but the results gave the Soviets reason to clear the launch of Soyuz 12, with a crew of two cosmonauts, on September 27.

== June 16, 1973 (Saturday) ==
- Benjamin Britten's final opera, Death in Venice, was performed for the first time, premièring at Snape Maltings in England near Aldeburgh.
- Soviet Communist Party General Secretary Leonid Brezhnev arrived in the United States as an Ilyushin Il-62 brought him and his entourage to Andrews Air Force Base, where he was greeted by U.S. Secretary of State William P. Rogers. Brezhnev was then flown by helicopter to Camp David, the U.S. presidential retreat in Maryland.
- Born:
  - Federica Mogherini, Italian Foreign Minister in 2014, Vice-President of the European Commission 2014–2019; in Rome
  - Aleksei Shaposhnikov, Russian politician and Chairman of the Moscow City Duma since 2014; in Moscow

== June 17, 1973 (Sunday) ==
- The submersible research vessel Johnson Sea Link became entangled on the wreckage of the destroyer USS Fred T. Berry, which had been scuttled to create an artificial reef off Key West, Florida. The submarine was trapped 360 feet (110 m) below the surface of the waters off the coast of the Florida Keys. The submersible was finally brought to the surface, but two of the four men aboard (E. Clayton Link and Albert Stover) had died of carbon dioxide poisoning.
- Bahamasair began operations as the official airline of the Bahamas and owned by the Bahamian government.
- The finals of championship tournaments of the major soccer football leagues of several European nations were held on the same day, with the Cypriot Cup (APOEL FC over Pezoporikos Larnaca FC, 1-0) at Nicosia; Coupe de France (Olympique Lyonnais 2-1 over FC Nantes) at Paris; the Greek Cup (Olympiacos F.C., 1-0 over PAOK) at Piraeus; the Polish Cup (Legia Warszawa 4 to 2 over Polonia Bytom on penalty kicks after a 0-0 after regular and extra time) at Poznan; and the Taça de Portugal (Sporting CP 3-2 over Vitória F.C.) at Oeiras.
- The 1973 Swedish Grand Prix motor race was won by Denny Hulme.
- Born: Leander Paes, Indian pro tennis player who won 18 doubles championships in Grand Slam events between 1999 and 2015; in Bombay (now Mumbai)

== June 18, 1973 (Monday) ==
- The Washington Summit, a meeting of the leaders of the United States (President Richard Nixon) and of the Soviet Union (Communist Party First Secretary Leonid Brezhnev) began at the White House in Washington D.C., and a state dinner took place in the evening.
- Operation End Sweep, clearing by the United States of sea mines that had been placed in the harbors of North Vietnam, resumed after a joint communiqué had been signed in Paris on June 13. Minesweeping had been suspended on April 15 after the U.S. had accused North Vietnam of failing to abide by the January 18 peace accords. The U.S. Navy's Task Force 78 completed the clearing of mines out of Haiphong harbor, then followed with Hon Gai and Cam Pha and the coastal areas off of Vinh. No further mines were founded after July 5, and on July 28, Task Force 78 left North Vietnamese territorial waters.
- Gordie Howe, who had played in the National Hockey League (NHL) until for more than 30 years before stepping down in 1971 to accept an office position for the Detroit Red Wings, signed with the rival World Hockey Association (WHA)'s Houston Aeros. Howe received an unprecedented one million dollar contract to play four seasons, while the Aeros also signed his sons, Mark Howe and Marty Howe to four-year player contracts for $400,000 apiece. The two sons, who were 19 and 18 years old, were prevented by NHL rules from being signed because of a rule that no amateur player would be eligible for the NHL draft until age 20.
- Born:
  - Julie Depardieu, French actress, the daughter of Gérard Depardieu and Élisabeth Depardieu; in Paris
  - Ray LaMontagne, American singer-songwriter; in Nashua, New Hampshire
- Died:
  - Roger Delgado, 55, British TV and film actor known for Doctor Who portraying the recurring villain, "The Master", was killed in an auto accident in Turkey when his car plunged into a ravine.
  - Fredrak Fraske, 101, German-born U.S. Army veteran and the last surviving participant in the American Indian Wars.

== June 19, 1973 (Tuesday) ==
- The Rocky Horror Show, a The successful musical by Richard O'Brien, premièred at the Royal Court Theatre in London for the first of 2,960 performances. It would be adapted to a cult film, The Rocky Horror Picture Show, in 1975.
- The Autonomous University of Aguascalientes opened in the Mexican city of Aguascalientes.
- Malcolm Williamson's "cassation", The Winter Star (1973), commissioned by the Arts Council of Great Britain, premièred at the Holm Cultram Festival.
- Born: Semini Iddamalgoda, Sri Lankan film and TV actress; in Colombo

== June 20, 1973 (Wednesday) ==
- Former Argentine President Juan Perón made his triumphant return to Argentina after almost 18 years in exile, accompanied by his wife Isabel Martinez Perón and incumbent President Héctor Cámpora. Because of violence at the Ezeiza International Airport, Perón's plane landed instead at an Argentine Air Force base, and the Peróns made plans to run in the next presidential election.
- All 27 people on Aeroméxico Flight 229 were killed when the DC-9 crashed into the side of a mountain while on approach to Puerto Vallarta in Mexico on a flight that originated in the U.S. at Houston.
- Snipers killed 13 people and wounded more than 300 at a Peronist rally in the Ezeiza section of Buenos Aires.
- Born:
  - Xin Baiqing, Chinese film actor; in Beijing
  - Camillo "Chino" Moreno, American musician; in Sacramento, California
  - Noah Z. Jones, American animator for the Disney Channel; in Fairport, New York

== June 21, 1973 (Thursday) ==
- The U.S. Supreme Court issued its landmark decision in Miller v. California, setting a three-prong standard for determining whether of not material is obscene (and thus not protected under the free speech guarantee of the First Amendment to the Constitution). Announcing a standard for acceptable free speech as a work that has "serious literary, artistic, political, or scientific value", the Court endorsed, 5 to 4, what is now called the "Miller test".
- The United States Hockey Hall of Fame was opened in the village of Eveleth, Minnesota to honor American ice hockey players not enshrined in the Hockey Hall of Fame (which at the time had only two persons born outside of Canada as honorees (U.S. natives Hobey Baker and Frank Brimsek) In addition to Baker and Brimsek, 22 American players were inducted in the first group.
- Born: Zuzana Čaputová, President of Slovakia since 2019; in Bratislava; Juliette Lewis, U.S. actress and singer, in Los Angeles
- Died: Frank Leahy, 64, American college football coach for Boston College (1939–1940) and the University of Notre Dame (1941–1943, 1946–1953). With a career record of 107 wins, 13 losses and 9 ties, his winning percentage of .864 remains the second best in NCAA Division I football history, second to Notre Dame coach Knute Rockne.

== June 22, 1973 (Friday) ==
- The Agreement on the Prevention of Nuclear War was signed in Washington D.C. by U.S. President Nixon and Soviet General Secretary Brezhnev. Later in the day, Nixon and Brezhnev flew together on the Air Force One presidential jet plane from Andrews Air Force Base to the El Toro Marine Air Station, and then were driven together to the "Western White House", Nixon's private vacation home at San Clemente, California.
- The United Nations Security Council voted unanimously in favor of UNSC Resolution 335, to recommend that the UN General Assembly admit both West Germany and East Germany, simultaneously, as voting members.
- The Skylab 2 mission astronauts (Pete Conrad, Joseph P. Kerwin and Paul J. Weitz) returned to Earth after having spent four weeks as the first Americans on an orbiting space station.
- Mark Felt resigned as Deputy Director of the FBI, after taking the job the day after the death of Director J. Edgar Hoover. During his time on the job, Felt had secretly informed Washington Post reporter Bob Woodward about the details of the Watergate scandal investigation, and had been identified by the Post only as "Deep Throat". He would not reveal the secret until 2005.

== June 23, 1973 (Saturday) ==
- The winner of East Germany's gliding championship, Ude Elke, escaped across the fortified border to West Germany by piloting his government-owned competition glider plane from a hill at Neustadt-Glewe. After fleeing the German Democratic Republic, landing well inside West Germany at a field in Soest.
- The first votes were cast in the 1973 Ethiopian general election, which would continue until July 7. These would be the last elections to be held in the country under imperial rule.
- Borussia Mönchengladbach defeated 1. FC Köln to win the DFB-Pokal, West Germany's soccer football playoffs. Köln had finished second in the Bundesliga regular season, and Mönchengladbach fifth. First place finisher FC Bayern Munich had been eliminated in the quarterfinals of the tournament.

== June 24, 1973 (Sunday) ==
- A fire killed 32 people and injured 15 at the UpStairs Lounge, a gay bar in New Orleans. Most of the persons killed had been trapped inside the building by bars across the three front windows. While the blaze was caused by arson and would remain the worst attack on a gay bar until the 2016 Pulse Night Club shooting in 2016, no evidence was ever found that the murder was a hate crime, and the person considered by police to be the most likely suspect was a gay man who had recently been made to leave the bar earlier.
- Leonid Brezhnev became the first Soviet leader to address the American people on television. Brezhnev's 47-minute speech was pre-recorded the afternoon before at President Nixon's estate, and then broadcast the next evening at 6:00 p.m. in each of the U.S. time zones. Among other things, he declared that "Mankind has outgrown the rigid 'cold war' armor which it was once forced to wear. It wants to breathe freely and peacefully."
- Died:
  - G. Raymond Rettew, 70, American biochemist who pioneered the mass production of the antibiotic penicillin during World War II and prevented tens of thousands of wounded U.S. troops from becoming fatally infected.
  - Bud Westmore, 55, American film makeup artist, died of a heart attack.

== June 25, 1973 (Monday) ==
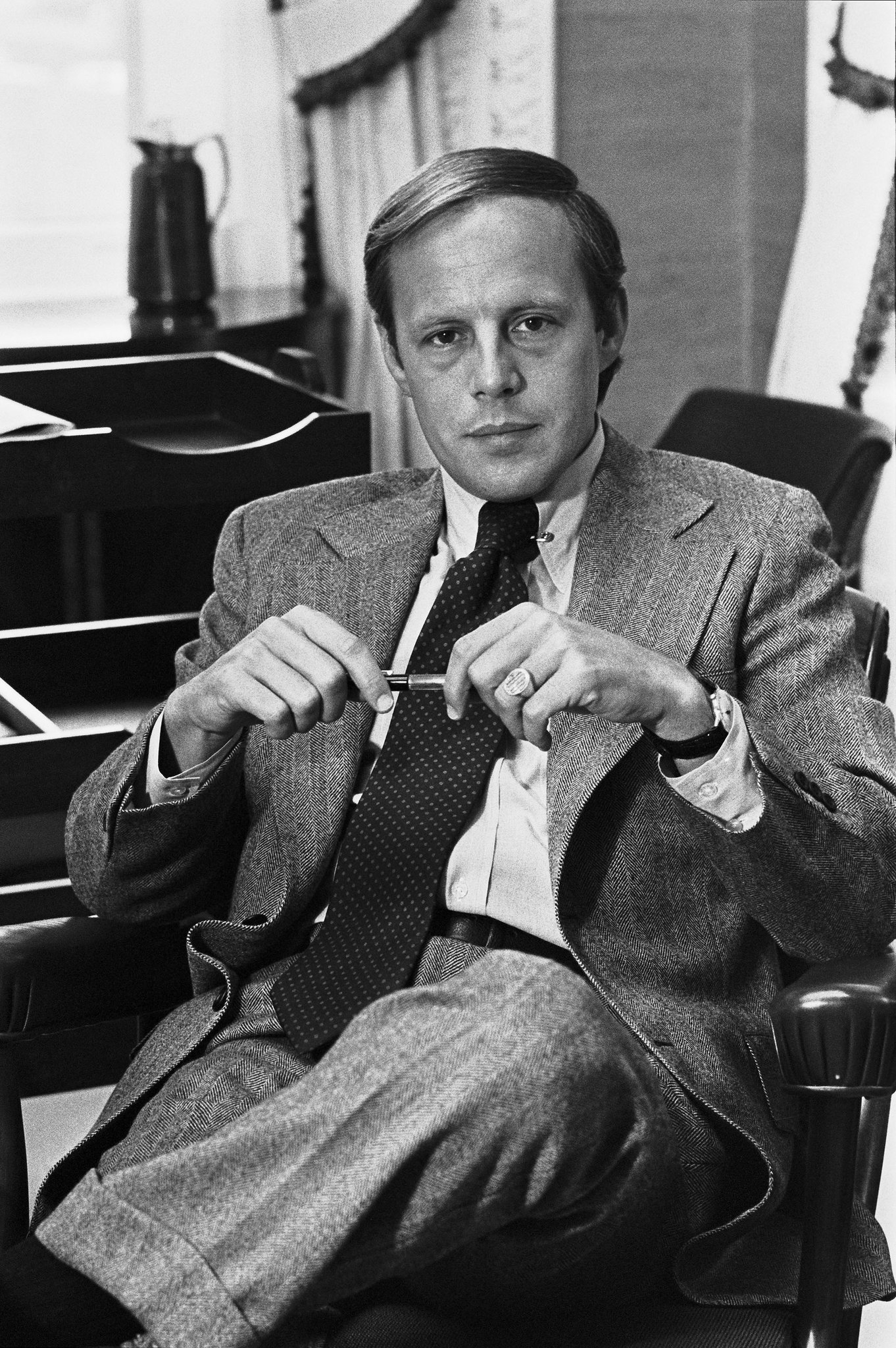
Former White House counsel John Dean

- Former White House lawyer John Dean began his testimony before the Senate Watergate Committee. Granted immunity from prosecution by vote of the Committee, Dean implicated U.S. President Nixon in accusations of obstruction of justice. After some opening remarks, Dean began his testimony by reading aloud a 245-page statement "in a clipped monotone" over six hours.
- The popular Latin American comic strip Mafalda was retired by its Argentine creator Joaquín Salvador Lavado Tejón (who wrote under the name of "Quino") after a run of almost nine years.
- The sinking of the Indian ship Saudi killed 40 of the 98 passengers and crew on board. The passenger ship, which also carried freight, capsized in the Indian Ocean off of the coast of the African nation of Somalia, after a huge wave caused her cargo to shift. The U.S. Navy destroyer USS Jonas Ingram rescued 48 survivors, and recovered nine bodies; the other 31 were missing and presumed dead.
- The Conference on Security and Cooperation in Europe (CSCE) began with the Meeting of Foreign Ministers in Helsinki, Finland.
- Erskine Childers took office as the fourth President of Ireland but would die after a year in office.

== June 26, 1973 (Tuesday) ==
- The Kidwai Memorial Institute of Oncology was founded in Bangalore in India.
- In the Soviet Union, the explosion of a Kosmos-3M rocket killed nine people at the Plesetsk Cosmodrome. The disaster would be revealed in 1989 when the Plesetsk center ended decades of secrecy and invited the Western press to visit.
- Albania's leader, Enver Hoxha, announced that his Communist nation would move further from the "degenerated bourgeois culture" popular in North America and Western Europe. In his speech to the Central Committee of the Albanian Workers' Party (Partia e Punës e Shqipërisë), General Secretary Hoxha said that "the spread of certain vulgar, alien tastes in music and art is contrary to socialist ethics and the positive traditions of our people," and cited "degenerate importations such as long hair, extravagant dress, screaming jungle music, coarse language, shameless behavior and so on."
- Died:
  - Henry Garrett, 79, American psychologist and white supremacist
  - Ernest Truex, 83, American stage, film and TV actor

== June 27, 1973 (Wednesday) ==
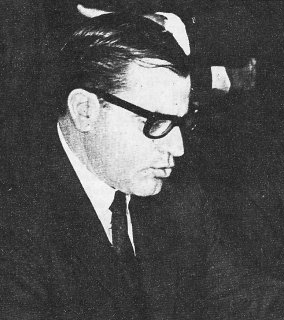
President Bordaberry

- Democratic rule in Uruguay was suspended as President Juan María Bordaberry closed parliament and imposed direct rule of the South American nation by a junta of military generals. In his Decree Number 464/1973, President Bordaberry announced that the General Assembly (the Senate and the Chamber of Representatives) were dissolved and replaced by the "Council of National Security" (Consejo de Seguridad Nacional or COSENA), with the president to be advised by the Junta de Oficiales Generales (JOG).
- In testimony before the Senate Watergate Committee, John Dean revealed the existence of an "enemies list" of 20 people. The list had been maintained in the White House for the purpose of using "the available federal machinery to screw our political enemies," including the use of tax audits by the Internal Revenue Service and manipulating federal contracts and grants.
- Born: Tom Tugendhat, British politician, Minister of State for Security; in Westminster, London
- Died:
  - Earl Browder, 82, American Communist and Chairman of the Communist Party USA from 1934 to 1945 during the height of its membership
  - Arthur P. Jacobs, 51, American film producer known for the Planet of the Apes series of films and Goodbye, Mr. Chips, died of a sudden heart attack.

== June 28, 1973 (Thursday) ==
- Elections were held for the new, 78-member Northern Ireland Assembly, replacing the bicameral Stormont. The creation of the new N.I. Assembly would lead to the first power-sharing in Northern Ireland between unionists (who favored remaining part of the United Kingdom) and nationalists (who were in favor of becoming part of a reunited Ireland).
- Algerian terrorist Mohamed Boudia, a senior member of the Popular Front for the Liberation of Palestine, was assassinated in Paris by Israel's intelligence agency, the Mossad. Boudia had parked his car outside the Faculty of Scientists building at the University of Paris early in the morning. At 11:00 a.m., the sat down in the driver's seat and started the car, triggering explosives under the seat were detonated.
- Nine people involved in a conspiracy at the Santiago Army garrison in Chile were arrested. Government Minister José Tohá released news of the arrests to the media.
- In Andover, Massachusetts, the 195-year-old Phillips Academy and the neighboring 144-year old Abbot Academy, two of the most prominent U.S. boarding schools for boys and girls, respectively, from wealthy families merged into a co-educational institution, becoming effective for the 1973-74 academic year.
- Born: Galina Peneva Ivanova, Bulgarian pop singer who performs under the name "Gloria"; in Ruse
- Died: Abd al-Rahman al-Bazzaz, 60, former prime minister of Iraq

== June 29, 1973 (Friday) ==
- Chilean Army Lieutenant Colonel Roberto Souper, having learned that he would be relieved of his command for his part in the conspiracy exposed on the previous day, failed in an attempted coup against the government of President Salvador Allende. Souper led 100 soldiers and four tanks from the 2nd Armored Regiment in an attack in Santiago on the Palacio de La Moneda, the presidential palace, shortly before 9:00 in the morning. Six civilians and a palace guard were killed, and 22 wounded before government troops put down the rebellion.
- By a vote of 73 to 16, the U.S. Senate passed the Case–Church Amendment, an attachment to a funding bill for the U.S. Department of State, prohibiting any further U.S. military activity in Indochina (North Vietnam, South Vietnam, Laos or Cambodia) without advance Congressional approval. The bill had passed the U.S. House of Representatives, 325 to 86, on June 26. After Nixon had vetoed the initial measure and cited national security as a factor, the House and Senate reached a compromise with the White House, allowing bombing of Cambodia to continue until August 15, 1973, rather than to halt immediately. The compromise passed 236 to 169 in the House and 63 to 26 in the Senate. President Nixon signed the measure into law on July 1.
- In Madrid, Athletic Bilbao won Spain's national championship playoff for soccer football, defeating CD Castellón, 2 to 0, to win the Copa del Generalísimo (now the Copa del Rey).

== June 30, 1973 (Saturday) ==
- After a little more than 117 days of drifting at sea for 1,500 miles (2,400 km) on a life raft, Britons Maurice and Maralyn Bailey were rescued by the crew of the South Korean fishing boat Weolmi 306. On March 4, 1973, the Baileys were forced to evacuate to the raft when their yacht, the Auralyn, sank in the Pacific Ocean after being damaged by a whale.
- A very long total solar eclipse was seen over most of the continent of Africa, lasting seven minutes and four seconds, the longest since June 20, 1955 (7 minutes, 8 seconds). During the entire 2nd millennium (1001 CE to 2000 CE), only seven total solar eclipses exceeded 7 minutes of totality. Another total eclipse of more than seven minutes will not occur until June 25, 2150.
- A French astronomer, Pierre Léna, had arranged for a chartered Concorde supersonic airliner to follow the path of the eclipse and the solar shadow at a speed of Mach 2 at an unobstructed altitude of 58,000 feet (18,000 m). Léna and other astronomers (Donald Liebenberg, Donald Hall, Alain Soufflot, Paul Wraight, and Serge Koutchmy) were able to see totality for an unprecedented time of one hour and 14 minutes as the Concorde flew over Western Africa from Mauritania to Chad.
- Iraq's Defense Minister, General Saadoun Ghaidan, was shot to death along with two other officers, Lieutenant Suleiman Mushed and police lieutenant Juhad Ahmed Duelmi, after being invited to a banquet by the nation's Director of Public Security, Nazem Kazzar.
- Aeroflot Flight 512 crashed into a building after taking off from the Amman international airport in Jordan, killing seven people in the building and two members of the flight crew. The 78 passengers on board, and five of the seven crew, survived.
- The 60th Tour de France began from Scheveningen in the Netherlands.
- Born:
  - Chan Ho Park, South Korean baseball pitcher and the first Korean player in U.S. Major League Baseball; in Gongju. Between 1992 and 2010, Park played 19 MLB seasons.
  - Robert Bales, U.S. Army sniper and mass murderer who killed 16 civilians in the 2012 Kandahar massacre; in Norwood, Ohio
- Died:
  - Nancy Mitford, 68, English novelist
  - Vasyl Velychkovsky, 70, Soviet Ukrainian priest who spent 13 years in prison for his religious activities, died one year after being allowed to emigrate, succumbing to complications from injuries sustained during his incarceration.
