= Acanthodrilidae =

Scientific classification
- Domain: Eukaryota
- Kingdom: Animalia
- Phylum: Annelida
- Clade: Pleistoannelida
- Clade: Sedentaria
- Class: Clitellata
- Order: Opisthopora
- Suborder: Lumbricina
- Family: Acanthodrilidae; Claus, 1880

Genera
- See text

Family of annelid worms

The Acanthodrilidae are an ancient and widely distributed family of earthworms which has native representatives in Australia, New Zealand, South Africa, South America, and North America. No native species are known from India (cf. Octochaetidae) nor Asia. The family possibly shows a pre-Pangaean distribution.

Membership requires an 'acanthodriline' arrangement of male pores and holoic nephridia.

== Genera ==
- Acanthodrilus Perrier, 1872
- Afrogaster Csuzdi, 2010
- Agastrodrilus Omodeo & Vaillaud, 1967
- Bahlia Gates, 1945
- Balanteodrilus Pickford, 1938
- Barogaster Gates, 1940
- Benhamia Michaelsen, 1889
- Benhamiona Csuzdi & Zicsi, 1994
- Borgesia James, 1991
- Calebiella Gates, 1945
- Celeriella Gates, 1958
- Chacdrilus Fragoso & Rojas, 2009
- Chaetocotoides Julka, 1988
- Chilota Michaelsen, 1899
- Cubadrilus Rodriguez & Fragoso, 2002
- Dashiella Julka, 1988
- Decachaetus Lee, 1959
- Deinodrilus Beddard, 1888
- Dichogaster Beddard, 1888
- Dinodriloides Benham, 1904
- Diplocardia Garman, 1888
- Diplotrema Spencer, 1900
- Drilocheira Fender and McKey-Fender, 1990
- Dudichiodrilus Csuzdi, 1995
- Eodriloides Zicsi, 1998
- Eodrilus Michaelsen, 1907
- Eudichogaster Michaelsen, 1902
- Eudinodriloides Lee, 1959
- Eutrigaster Cognetti, 1904
- Eutyphoeus Michaelsen, 1900
- Exxus Gates, 1959
- Guineoscolex Csuzdi & Zicsi, 1994
- Herbettodrilus Julka, Blanchart & Chapuis-Lardy, 2004
- Hoplochaetella Michaelsen, 1900
- Hoplochaetina Michaelsen, 1926
- Kanchuria Julka, 1988
- Karmiella Julka, 1983
- Kaxdrilus Fragoso & Rojas, 1994
- Kayarmacia Jamieson, 1997
- Konkadrilus Julka, 1988
- Kotegeharia Julka, 1988
- Larsonidrilus James, 1993
- Lavellodrilus Fragoso, 1988
- Lennogaster Gates, 1939
- Leucodrilus Lee, 1952
- Loksaia Csuzdi, 1996
- Mallehulla Julka, 1982
- Maoridrilus Michaelsen, 1899
- Mayadrilus Fragoso & Rojas, 1994
- Microscolex Rosa, 1887
- Millsonia Beddard, 1894
- Monothecodrilus Csuzdi & Zicsi, 1994
- Nellogaster Gates, 1938
- Neochaeta Lee, 1959
- Neodiplotrema Dyne, 1997
- Neodrilus Beddard, 1887
- Neogaster Cernosvitov, 1934
- Neotrigaster James, 1991
- Notiodrilus Michaelsen, 1899
- Octochaetoides Michaelsen, 1926
- Octochaetona Gates, 1962
- Octochaetus Beddard, 1893
- Octonochaeta Julka, 1988
- Omodeona Sims, 1967
- Omodeoscolex Csuzdi, 1993
- Parachilota Pickford, 1937
- Pellogaster Gates, 1939
- Perieodrilus Michaelsen, 1910
- Pickfordia Omodeo, 1958
- Pickfordiella Csuzdi, 2010
- Plagiochaeta Benham, 1892
- Priodochaeta Gates, 1940
- Priodoscolex Gates, 1940
- Protozapotecia James, 1993
- Ramiella Stephenson, 1921
- Ramiellona Michaelsen, 1935
- Reginaldia Csuzdi, 2006
- Rhododrilus Beddard, 1889
- Rillogaster Gates, 1939
- Scolioscolides Gates, 1937
- Senapatiella Julka, Blanchart & Chapuis-Lardy, 2004
- Shimodrilus Julka, Blanchart & Chapuis-Lardy, 2004
- Sylvodrilus Lee, 1959
- Travoscolides Gates, 1940
- Trigaster Benham, 1886
- Udeina Michaelsen, 1910
- Wahoscolex Julka, 1988
- Wegeneriella Michaelsen, 1933
- Wegeneriona Cernosvitov, 1939
- Yagansia Michaelsen, 1899
- Zapatadrilus James, 1991
- Zapotecia Eisen, 1900

== Sources ==
- Blakemore, R.J. (2005). Whither Octochaetidae? – its family status reviewed. In: Advances in Earthworm Taxonomy II. Eds. A.A. & V.V. Pop. Proceedings IOTM2, Cluj University Press. Romania. pp. 63–84. https://web.archive.org/web/20071210202216/http://www.oligochaeta.org/ITOM2/IOTM2.htm; https://web.archive.org/web/20110722081605/http://bio-eco.eis.ynu.ac.jp/eng/database/earthworm/Octochaetidae5.doc .
- Blakemore, R.J. (2006). Revised Key to Earthworm Families (Ch. 9). In: A Series of Searchable Texts on Earthworm Biodiversity, Ecology and Systematics from Various Regions of the World – 3rd Edition (2008). Ed.: R.J. Blakemore. VermEcology, Yokohama, Japan. ICZN validated CD-ROM Publication. Website: http://www.annelida.net/earthworm/.
- Michaelsen, W. (1900). Das Tierreich 10: Vermes, Oligochaeta. Friedländer & Sohn, Berlin. Pp. xxix+575, figs. 1-13. Online here: https://archive.org/details/oligochaeta10mich.
- Stephenson, J. (1930). The Oligochaeta. Clarendon Press, Oxford. Pp. 978.
- Blakemore, R.J. (2013). The major megadrile families of the World reviewed again on their taxonomic types (Annelida: Oligochaeta: Megadrilacea). Opuscula Zoologica Budapest: 44(2): 107–127. .
