= Diplocardia meansi =

Conservation status
- Imperiled (NatureServe)

Scientific classification
- Kingdom: Animalia
- Phylum: Annelida
- Clade: Pleistoannelida
- Clade: Sedentaria
- Class: Clitellata
- Order: Opisthopora
- Suborder: Lumbricina
- Family: Acanthodrilidae
- Genus: Diplocardia
- Species: D. meansi

Binomial name
- Diplocardia meansi Gates, 1977

Species of earthworm

Diplocardia meansi, the Means's giant earthworm, or Rich Mountain giant earthworm, is a species of earthworm endemic to the United States. It is the second longest earthworm in North America. It was discovered by D. Bruce Means on June 11, 1973, in Polk County, Arkansas. and later described by Gates in 1977. It occurs only on Rich Mountain, part of the Ouachita Mountains.

== Description ==
Diplocardia meansi only occurs on Rich Mountain, located in Oklahoma and Arkansas. D. meansi was found by Means while digging for salamanders on Rich Mountain. D. meansi can be over 18 inches, and is the second longest earthworm in North America.

Diplocardia meansi inhabits drier areas of the mountain, and is not found in mesic and saturated soils nears seeps or streams. It occurs mostly in poor developed talus soils. During rains in May, D. meansi can be seen plentifully on the surface, potentially to breed. Cocoons laid include only one or two immatures.

== Bioluminescence ==
Similar to D. longa, Diplocardia meansi exhibits bioluminescence.

If tweaked or shocked in the dark, D. meansi secretes a distasteful glowing coelomic fluid.
