= Octochaetus multiporus =

Conservation status
- Least Concern (IUCN 3.1)

Scientific classification
- Kingdom: Animalia
- Phylum: Annelida
- Clade: Pleistoannelida
- Clade: Sedentaria
- Class: Clitellata
- Order: Opisthopora
- Family: Megascolecidae
- Genus: Octochaetus
- Species: O. multiporus

Binomial name
- Octochaetus multiporus (Beddard, 1885)

Synonyms
- Acanthodrilus multiporus Beddard, 1885

Species of annelid worm

Octochaetus multiporus, commonly known as the New Zealand earthworm, is a megascolecid worm endemic to New Zealand. It is mainly found in the south of Manawatu but may also be found along the east coast of the South Island. A bioluminescent worm, Octochaetus multiporus secretes a luminescent fluid from its mouth when disturbed or punctured.

== Taxonomy ==
The New Zealand earthworm was first described by Frank Evers Beddard in 1885 and originally named Acanthodrilus multiporus. It is the type-species and type-genus of Octochaetidae, a family of earthworms mainly confined to the Australasian region, with the long anticipated "missing-link" between octochaetids in New Zealand and India found recently with Octochaetus ambrosensis (Blakemore, 1997) and its allied taxa in Australia.

== Description ==
Octochaetus multiporus is pale pink in colour, with a translucent body wall and a purple streak that runs along the top midline of the body. The clitellum (a glandular section on the wall of the body, which holds eggs) and length are also unique to the worm and help with identification as it can grow up to 300 millimetres (12 in) and can get a diameter of 10 millimetres (0.4 in). The New Zealand Earthworm has clitella on 14-19th segments, which can extend and overlap onto the 13 and 20th segments (Lee 1959). The New Zealand Earthworm has strong muscles in the anterior and posterior for burrowing but a weak body. The majority of the earthworm's muscles are present in the anterior and the posterior of the body (head and anus) as this allows for optimum burrowing ability. This helps with the worms capacity to improve soil structure in pastures and native woodland.

== Distribution and habitat ==
Octochaetus multiporus is endemic to New Zealand, meaning it can only be found in New Zealand and nowhere else globally. Octochaetus multiporus has one of the highest populations of New Zealand's native earthworm species and have related species in the same family across India and in Australia

Found mainly in pastureland of the south of Manawatu, (North Island), O. multiporus is also found down the east coast of the South Island and on Stewart Island. They are found in the subsoil of New Zealand's native forests, tussock land and pastureland which is not affected by deforestation and chemical pollution. They are found in the native forests of these areas, as this is their natural habitat before colonization and heavy soil impact.

The New Zealand Earthworm is found in greater numbers in soils sloping away from the sun as this allows for high ventilation and soil moisture for the optimum habitat of the worm. O. multiporus are found in highest numbers in low to moderate soil fertility levels. Experiments have been done to analyse their behaviors in pastureland using key plants of Chicory and Clover, burrowing under them in a horizontal pattern. General worms have a very small temperature range between optimum living and death, which also related to the O. multiporus. The optimum temperature for most earthworms is 20 °C (68 °F) and are threatened at temperatures of 25–30 °C (77–86 °F).

== Life cycle and ecology ==
Because of its abundance, O. multiporus has been the subject of much research, but despite this there is not a lot of information found on its life cycle

=== Diet ===
Earthworms feed on dead and decaying matter in the soil e.g. roots and leaves, aerating the soil and breaking down organic matter creating a valuable type of fertilizer. The soils best suited for O. multiporus are in the Southern Manawatu Region, east coast of the South Island and Stewart Island. O. multiporus relies less on native vegetation than other native worms.

=== Predators and diseases ===
In New Zealand, the main predators of earthworms are introduced bird species that live on the pastureland in which O. multiporus lives. These species include gulls, starlings and magpies, which are all introduced into New Zealand.

In the native forests of New Zealand, O. multiporus is a key part of the kiwi's diet as it lives on the forest floor looking for bugs and worms in the soil.

Much research has been done to find out what parasites are hosted by or harm earthworms, but not much information has been found about what harm they cause. These parasites include bacteria, fungi, mites and other parasite-like organisms.

== Relationship to humans ==
Earthworms are important to New Zealand agriculture and native bush systems. They provide a vital service to improving the soil structure, particularly when summer pastures are moist and there is an absence of introduced lumbricid earthworms

O. multiporus is a species that is of great interest to the scientific community due to its unique defence mechanisms. When threatened, O. multiporus squirts a luminescent fluid from its mouth. The luminescent fluid helps to indicate the maturity of the worm, changing colour varying from blue to yellow/orange. In addition to releasing the fluid, this worm itself is bioluminescent.
