= July 1973 =

Month of 1973

<<	July 1973					>>
Su	Mo	Tu	We	Th	Fr	Sa
1	2	3	4	5	6	7
8	9	10	11	12	13	14
15	16	17	18	19	20	21
22	23	24	25	26	27	28
29	30	31

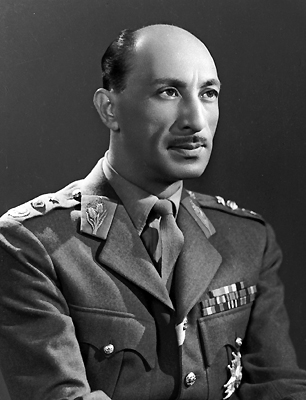
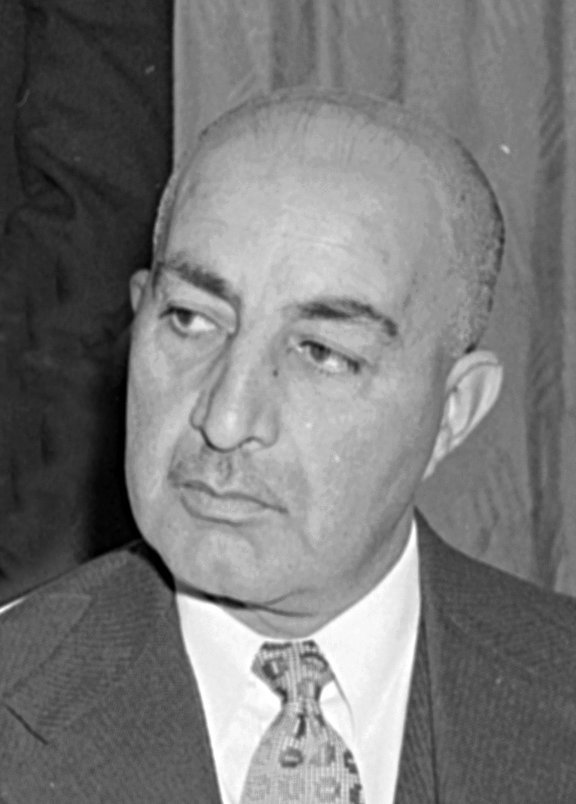
July 17, 1973: King Zahir Shah of Afghanistan overthrown, Mohammed Daoud proclaims himself President
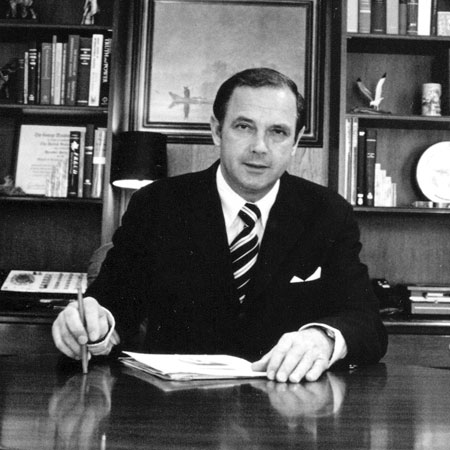
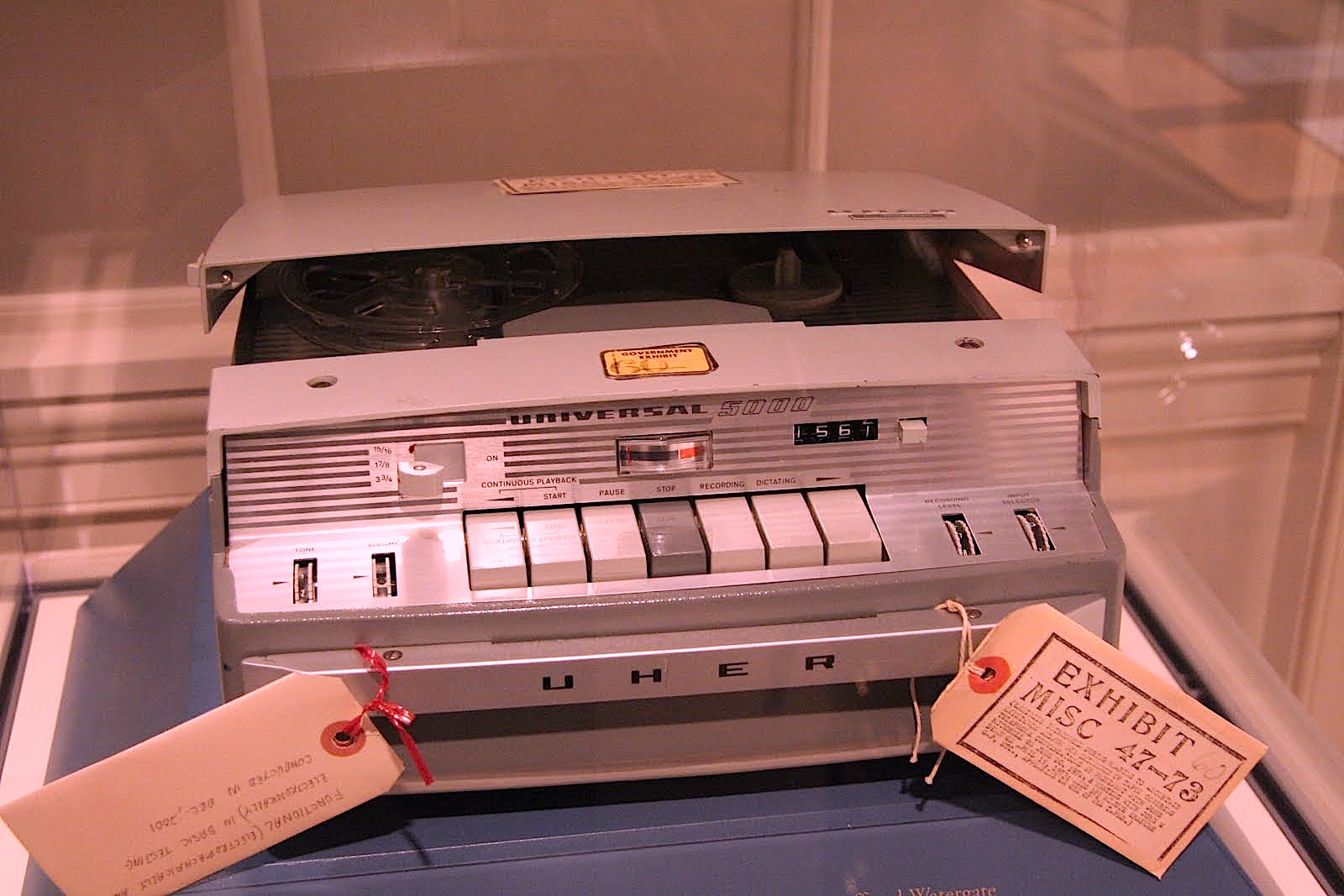
July 16, 1973: Surprise witness Alexander Butterfield reveals existence of Watergate tapes to the US Senate

The following events occurred in July 1973:

== July 1, 1973 (Sunday) ==
- The United States Drug Enforcement Administration (DEA) was created within the U.S. Department of Justice to enforce the Controlled Substances Act, merging the Bureau of Narcotics and Dangerous Drugs and the Office of Drug Abuse Law Enforcement.
- U.S. President Richard M. Nixon signed legislation including the Case–Church Amendment, prohibiting funding for the resumption of all U.S. military activity in South Vietnam, North Vietnam, Laos and Cambodia, without Congressional approval. The only remaining operation in Indochina was the U.S. Air Force bombing of Cambodia, which was allowed to continue until August 15, 1973. The original amendment, attached to a funding bill, had been passed by the U.S. House of Representatives 325 to 86, on June 26, and by the U.S. Senate 73 to 16 on June 29.
- The British Library was established.
- The deputy military attaché of Israel's Embassy in the U.S., Colonel Yosef Alon, was shot five times in the chest and killed as he and his wife were returning to their home in Chevy Chase, Maryland.
- Loyola Marymount University formally came into existence in the Los Angeles suburb of Westchester, California, with the merger of all-male Loyola University and the all-female Marymount California University. The merger had been announced on February 9.

== July 2, 1973 (Monday) ==
- Match Game '73, the first and most successful revival of the NBC game show, made its debut on CBS. As with the NBC version, Gene Rayburn, was the host. Rather than having two celebrity panelists, the show had six, starting with Richard Dawson, Vicki Lawrence, Anita Gillette, Jack Klugman, Michael Landon and Jo Ann Pflug, and had been scheduled to start on June 25, but had been preempted by the testimony of John Dean before the Senate Watergate Committee. It would soon become the highest-rated daytime TV show on U.S. television.
- Died:
  - Betty Grable, 56 American film actress and pin-up girl of World War II, died of lung cancer.
  - Swede Savage, 36, U.S. race car driver, died of injuries sustained in a crash during the Indianapolis 500 race in May.

== July 3, 1973 (Tuesday) ==
- The U.S. Army and U.S. Navy dismissed all charges that had been brought against seven former American prisoners of war in court-martial proceedings. The enlisted men — five Army and two Marines — had been charged with collaboration with the enemy. In addition to the lack of more than hearsay and circumstantial evidence, the servicemen had spent an average of five years confinement. This came seven days after the June 26 suicide of an eighth accused person.
- David Bowie "retired" his Ziggy Stardust stage persona in front of a shocked audience at the Hammersmith Odeon at the end of his British tour.
- Born:
  - Saumya Joshi, Indian actor, playwright and director in Gujarati theater; in Ahmedabad, Gujarat state
  - Patrick Wilson, American stage and TV (actor); in Norfolk, Virginia
- Died:
  - Ellen Kaarma, 45, Estonian Soviet film and stage actress
  - Karel Ančerl, 65, Czech orchestral conductor

== July 4, 1973 (Wednesday) ==
- The Treaty of Chaguaramas was signed by representatives of the nations of Barbados, Guyana, Jamaica, and Trinidad and Tobago to create CARICOM, the Caribbean Community, an economic union to replace the Caribbean Free Trade Association (CARIFTA).
- Camilla Shand, then 25 and destined to become the Queen consort of the United Kingdom in 2022, married for the first time, in a wedding to British Army Major Andrew Parker Bowles, in a ceremony attended by the Queen Mother and by Princess Anne. After her divorce from Parker Bowles in 1995, she would marry Prince Charles, the future King Charles III of the United Kingdom, in 2005.
- Don Powell, the drummer of British pop group Slade, was critically injured in a car crash in Wolverhampton and his 20-year-old girlfriend was killed. Powell recovered after surgery, and was able to join the band ten weeks later in New York, to record "Merry Xmas Everybody".
- Born: GACKT (stage name for Gakuto Oshiro), Japanese musician, singer, songwriter, record producer and actor; in Okinawa.
- Died: Helen Ogston, 91, British suffragette

== July 5, 1973 (Thursday) ==
- Grégoire Kayibanda, the first President of Rwanda, was overthrown 11 years after the central African nation had become independent, in a coup d'état led by his Minister of Defense, Juvénal Habyarimana.
- The Isle of Man Post began to issue its own postage stamps.
- In the U.S., 11 firefighters were killed in a catastrophic explosion of boiling liquid expanding vapor in Kingman, Arizona, following a fire that broke out as propane was being transferred from a railroad car to a storage tank. This explosion has become a classic incident, studied in fire department training programs worldwide.
- Guerrillas in Rhodesia kidnapped 292 students and staff from the remote St. Albert's Mission, a Catholic school established by German Jesuits, and were pursued by Rhodesian troops and local trackers and hunters, to the border with Portuguese Mozambique, 21 miles (34 km) away. In the confusion of the chase, 214 of the captives escaped, but 46 students and 32 adults were taken into Mozambique.
- Born: Róisín Murphy, Irish singer and songwriter; in Arklow, County Wicklow

== July 6, 1973 (Friday) ==
The Flag of Flanders

- The Flemish Cultural Community (Vlaamse Gemeenschap) of Belgium, located in Flanders, the northern one-third of the European kingdom, adopted an official flag and anthem, as well as setting July 6 as an annual holiday. The anthem, De Vlaamse Leeuw ("The Flemish Lion") had been written by Hippoliet Van Peene in 1847.
- The James Bond film Live and Let Die was released in British cinemas (after premiering in the United States on June 27, 1973), with the spy played by 45-year-old The Saint star Roger Moore.
- Died:
  - Joe E. Brown, 81, American comedian and character actor on film
  - Otto Klemperer, 88, German conductor and composer

== July 7, 1973 (Saturday) ==
- U.S. President Nixon sent a letter to U.S. Senator Sam Ervin the chairman of the U.S. Senate Watergate Investigation Committee, writing "In this letter I shall state the reasons why I shall not testify before the committee or permit access to Presidential papers. I want to strongly emphasize that my decision, in both cases is based on my constitutional obligation to preserve intact the powers and prerogatives of the Presidency and not upon any desire to withhold information relevant to your inquiry", and went on to justify his position. Nixon agreed five days later to meet with Senator Ervin at Ervin's request to avoid "a fundamental constitutional confrontation between the Congress and the Presidency."
- The Afrikaner Weerstandsbeweging (AWB or Afrikaner Resistance Movement), a white nationalist terrorist organization in South Africa, was founded by former police officer Eugène Terre'Blanche and six other Afrikaners at a meeting in Heidelberg, Transvaal Province.
- Uganda's dictator Idi Amin ordered the detention of 112 Peace Corps volunteers from the U.S. after their chartered East Africa Airlines flight stopped at the Entebbe International Airport near Kampala for refueling. The U.S. airplane had been on its way from London to Bukavu in Zaire (now the Democratic Republic of the Congo). Amin, shouted "Bring them all back!" after he learned that Peace Corps members were on the Vickers VC10, told his cabinet the next day that he felt that the group "could be mercenaries trying to enter Rwanda", where the government had recently been overthrown. The airliner halted preparations for takeoff after being warned that it would be shot down by Ugandan Air Force fighters. The hostages were released two days later.
- The 1973 Ethiopian general election, the last to be held under imperial rule in Ethiopia, ended as voters chose from more than 1,500 independent candidates for the 250 seats of the Chamber of Deputies (Yaheg Mamria Meker-beth). Aklilu Habte-Wold continued as prime minister.
- Billie Jean King defeated Chris Evert, also from the U.S., in straight sets, 6-0 and 7–5, to win the women's singles title at the All-England Tennis Championship at Wimbledon. In the men's finals, Jan Kodeš of Czechoslovakia defeated Alex Metreveli of the Soviet Union, 6–1, 9–8 and 6–3 to win the title the same day.
- Born: Kailash Kher, Indian composer and singer; in Meerut, Uttar Pradesh
- Died:
  - Veronica Lake (stage name for Constance Ockelmann), 50, American film actress, died of kidney failure brought on by hepatitis.
  - Seán Mac Eoin, 79, Irish Minister for Justice 1948–1951, Minister for Defence 1954–1957

== July 8, 1973 (Sunday) ==
- Takieddin el-Solh was appointed as the new prime minister of Lebanon by President Suleiman Frangieh.
- Three racing motorcyclists, Renzo Colombini (aged 30), Renato Galtrucco (aged 36) and Carlo Chionio (aged 26), were killed in Italy the Campionato Italiano Juniores at the Autodromo Nazionale Monza.
- Born: Daniel Lipšic, Slovak politician who served as Deputy Prime Minister and Justice Minister from 2002 to 2006, and Interior Minister from 2010 to 2012; in Bratislava, Czechoslovakia.
- Died:
  - Arthur Calwell, 76, Australian politician and Leader of the Opposition, 1960–1967, as Chairman of the Australian Labor Party
  - Gene L. Coon, 49, American TV producer known of Star Trek, died of lung cancer.
  - Wilfred Rhodes, 95, English cricketer

== July 9, 1973 (Monday) ==
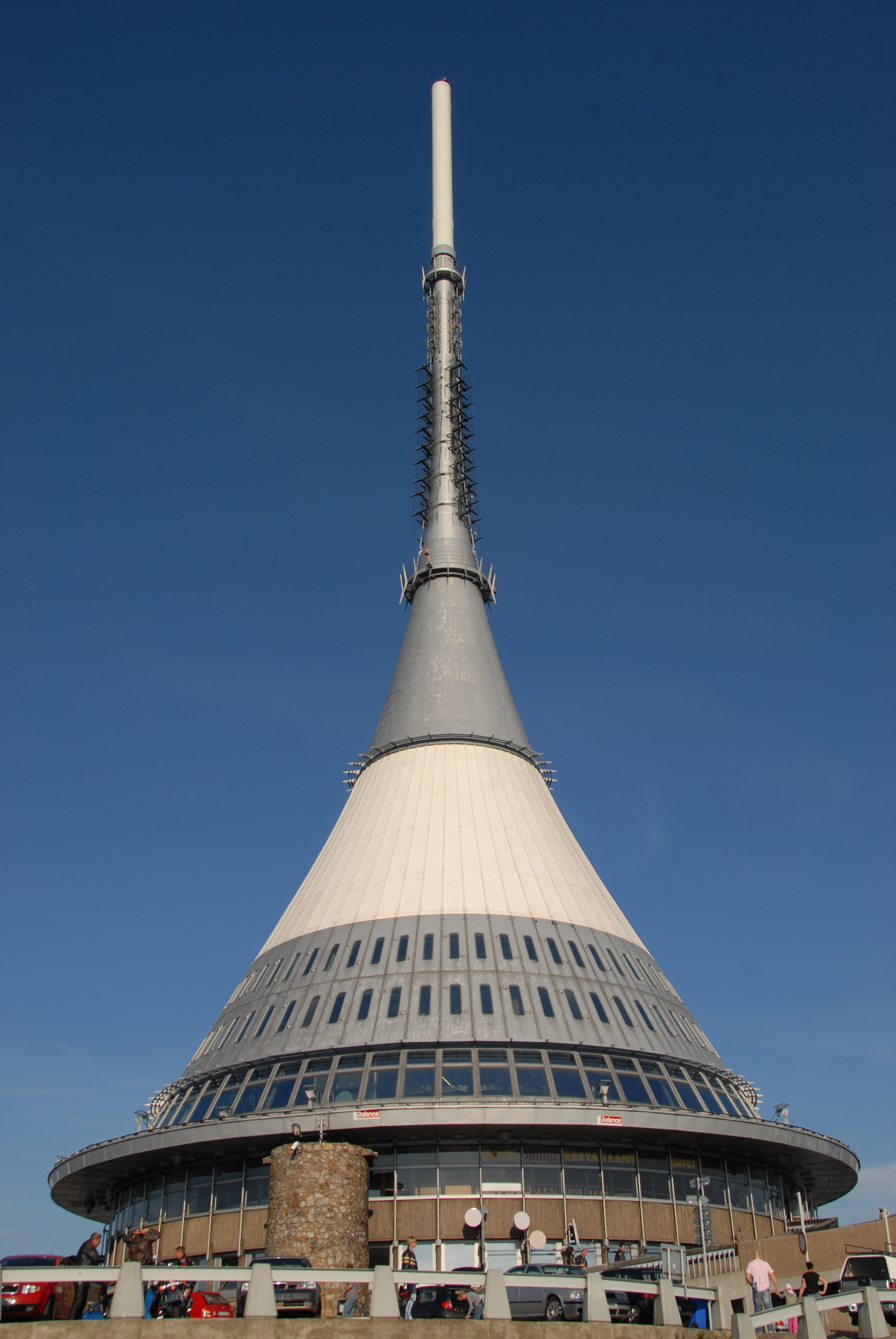
The hyperboloid Ještěd Tower

- The Ještěd Tower, designed by architect Karel Hubáček as a hyperboloid-shaped hotel with a 94 metres (308 ft) tall TV transmission antenna, opened outside of the city of Liberec in Czechoslovakia.
- The United States and Czechoslovakia agreed to establish direct diplomatic relations for the first time since the Communist Party had taken control of the Eastern European nation. U.S. Secretary of State William P. Rogers and Czechoslovak Foreign Minister Bohuslav Chňoupek signed the agreement to open consulates in each other's nations during the visit by Rogers to Prague.
- British serial killer Patrick Mackay committed the first of 13 murders to which he would later confess, stabbing a woman on a train as it passed near Catford in Greater London.
- Born: Maxine Linehan, Northern Irish-born stage actress and singer; in Newry, County Armagh

== July 10, 1973 (Tuesday) ==
July 10, 1973: Independence granted by the UK...

- The Bahamas was granted independence by the United Kingdom, becoming a nation with Sir Lynden Pindling its first Prime Minister, and colonial governor Sir John W. Paul as its first Governor-General. The Caribbean archipelago nation remained within the Commonwealth of Nations.
- Treasure hunter Mel Fisher announced at a press conference that he and his team of explorers had located the remains of the Spanish galleon Nuestra Señora de Atocha, which had sunk in a hurricane in the Marquesa Keys on September 5, 1622, about 40 miles (64 km) west of Key West, Florida. The worth of the treasure at the time was estimated to be more than $600,000,000.
- John Paul Getty III, the rebellious 16-year-old grandson of the wealthiest man in the world, was kidnapped from the Piazza Farnese in Rome, and held for $17 million ransom. His grandfather, J. Paul Getty, refused to pay the ransom, arguing that giving money to terrorists would put his 13 other grandchildren at risk. A ransom of $3.2 million would be paid in December, but only after the teenager's ear had been cut off by his kidnappers and sent to a Rome newspaper. Young Getty would be freed on December 15.
- In the Czechoslovak capital of Prague, Olga Hepnarová intentionally drove a rented truck into a crowd of people in Strossmayer Square, killing eight and injuring 12 others. Hepnarová would be convicted of murder and hanged in prison on March 12, 1975.
- In Iceland, efforts to protect the island of Heimaey from the eruption of the Eldfell volcano were completed after 148 days of pumping seawater to cool the lava into stone. An estimated 7.3 million cubic meters of water were pumped at a cost of US$1,447,742.
- Born: Oleksandr Yanukovych, Ukrainian multi-millionaire, son of former President of Ukraine Viktor Yanukovych; in Donetsk, Ukrainian SSR, Soviet Union.
- Died: Wallace "Bud" Smith, 49, former world lightweight boxing champion 1955–1956 and 1948 Olympian, was shot to death after confronting a man who was beating up a woman.

== July 11, 1973 (Wednesday) ==
- The crash of Varig Flight 820 near Paris killed 123 of the 135 people on board, after a fire broke out in a lavatory aboard the Boeing 707. As the Brazilian flight from São Paulo was almost to its destination, smoke filled the cabin, and the plane crashed while attempting to make an emergency landing in an onion field 2.5 miles (4.0 km) short of its scheduled destination of Orly Airport. Among the dead were the president of the Senate of Brazil, Filinto Müller (73), the Olympic sailor Jörg Bruder (35), and Brazilian sports journalist Júlio Delamare (45).
- The most eagerly-anticipated tennis match of the year was set up as 1973 Wimbledon women's champion Billie Jean King accepted a challenge from 1939 Wimbledon men's champion Bobby Riggs to an unprecedented "winner-take-all" $100,000 prize. The value of the winner's share was equivalent to more than $670,000 fifty years later. Riggs, a self-described "male chauvinist" had said earlier it was fair that men in professional tennis were paid more in Grand Slam events than women and that he could defeat even the best woman player in the world.
- Died: Robert Ryan, 63, American film actor known for The Wild Bunch and Captain Nemo and the Underwater City

== July 12, 1973 (Thursday) ==
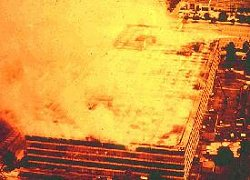
July 12, 1973: Aerial view of the National Personnel Records Center fire in progress

- A major fire broke out that destroyed the entire sixth floor of the National Personnel Records Center in the St. Louis suburb of Overland, Missouri. The blaze destroyed almost all (80 percent) of Veterans Administration service records for U.S. Army personnel who served between 1912 and 1960 (including those in World War I, World War II or the Korean War), and 75% of the U.S. Air Force service records stored on the sixth floor. None of the destroyed records had been microfilmed or had duplicate copies, and no index had been made.
- University of Maryland basketball coach Lefty Driesell and two other men saved the lives of 10 children from a fire in several beachfront townhouses in Bethany Beach, Delaware. Coach Driesell's involvement went unnoticed until the Washington Star-News reported it on July 20. Paul Williamson, athletic director for the high schools in Durham, North Carolina, was one of the other heroes, and Driesell said he didn't know the name of the other man.
- U.S. President Nixon was admitted to the Bethesda Naval Hospital after being diagnosed with viral pneumonia. Nixon remained in the hospital for a full week before being released on July 20. He said upon his return that he would not resign or slow down for health reasons, commenting "The health of a man is not nearly as important as the health of a nation and the health of the world."
- Born: Yuan Li, Chinese film actress; in Hangzhou, Zhejiang province
- Died: Lon Chaney Jr. (stage name for Creighton Chaney), 67, American film actor who was the son of Lon Chaney and followed a career of starring in horror films from 1941 to 1963, as well as other dramatic roles

== July 13, 1973 (Friday) ==
- Héctor José Cámpora resigned as President of Argentina along with Vice President Vicente Solano Lima to allow Juan Perón to return to power. Raúl Lastiri, the President of the Argentine Chamber of Deputies, stepped in as interim president until presidential elections could be held on September 23, and would be succeeded by election winner Juan Perón on October 11.
- Alexander Butterfield, head of the Federal Aviation Administration, and the chief assistant to White House Chief of Staff H. R. Haldeman, revealed that almost all of President Nixon's conversations in the Oval Office of the White House had been tape recorded, the first indication to investigators of the Watergate scandal of a previously unknown source of evidence. While John Dean had voiced an opinion that he suspected that conversations were taped, no witness had confirmed the belief until Butterfield was interviewed before his public testimony by Donald Sanders, one of the committee's attorneys. When Sanders asked whether there was any validity to Dean's suspicions, Butterfield told him "I was wondering if someone would ask that. There is tape in the Oval Office." Butterfield's dramatic testimony came on the following Monday.
- The self-titled debut studio album by the British rock band Queen was released simultaneously by EMI Records in the UK and by Elektra Records in the U.S.
- Died: Willy Fritsch, 72, German film actor

== July 14, 1973 (Saturday) ==
- Peter Revson won the 1973 British Grand Prix. On the first lap, a pileup caused by the crash of Jody Scheckter's car forced him and 11 other drivers to retire. The race was stopped at the end of the second lap and restarted over the original distance.
- Born: Andri Snær Magnason, Icelandic novelist and playwright, who finished in third place in the 2016 Icelandic presidential election; in Reykjavík

== July 15, 1973 (Sunday) ==
- The Soviet city of Alma-Ata in the Kazakh SSR (now Kazakhstan) was saved from destruction by a landslide when a massive torrent of mud was blocked by the Medeu Dam that had been constructed the year before. Persons above the Medeo Dam were killed when the mudslide, from the Tuiuk-Su glacier, sent 225,000 cubic meters of water into the valley below, shattering three other dams and killing about 50 vacationers and seven employees who had come to a tourist resort at the Gorelnik mountain.
- The nation of Bangladesh amended its constitution for the first time so that it could pursue prosecution of war crimes arising from its fight for independence. Article 47 was changed to reflect prosecution or punishment of war crimes could not be declared unconstitutional. The change cleared the way for the government to begin prosecution of war criminals, whose attorneys had argued that they were protected by the Fundamental Rights guaranteed in Article III.
- Born: Hassani Shapi, Kenyan-born film actor known for portraying Jedi Master "Eeth Koth" in Star Wars: Episode I – The Phantom Menace; in Mombasa
- Died: Clarence White, 29, American bluegrass music guitarist for The Byrds and pioneer of country rock, was killed in Palmdale, California when he was struck by a drunk driver while loading equipment into his car after performing a concert.

== July 16, 1973 (Monday) ==
- FAA Administrator and former White House aide Alexander Butterfield revealed to the United States Senate Watergate Committee that President Richard Nixon had secretly recorded potentially incriminating conversations. Republican counsel Fred Thompson, later a U.S. Senator for Tennessee, posed the question, "Mr. Butterfield, are you aware of the installation of any listening devices in the Oval Office of the President?" and the surprise witness replied, "I was aware of listening devices. Yes, sir."
- Canadian TV personality Alex Trebek made his U.S. television debut for as host of a short-lived game show on the NBC television network, The Wizard of Odds. Trebek had previously hosted the CBC game show Strategy for six months in 1969. Trebek would host several more game shows for NBC before becoming most famous for hosting a syndicated revival of Jeopardy! starting on September 10, 1984.

== July 17, 1973 (Tuesday) ==
- King Mohammed Zahir Shah of Afghanistan was deposed by his cousin, General Mohammed Daoud Khan while in Italy undergoing eye surgery. Daoud Khan declared the establishment of a republic with himself as president, and an end to the Afghan monarchy.
- Voting was held in Guyana for the 53-seat National Assembly. The People's National Congress party, led by Prime Minister Forbes Burnham, increased its majority with 37, or almost 70%, of the seats.

== July 18, 1973 (Wednesday) ==
- The Northern Ireland Constitution Act 1973 received royal assent and went into effect in the United Kingdom. The act abolished the suspended Parliament of Northern Ireland and the post of Governor of Northern Ireland and made provision for a devolved administration consisting of an Executive chosen by the new Northern Ireland Assembly devised under the Sunningdale Agreement.
- The White House tape recording system was turned off permanently, two days after its existence had been publicly revealed in the U.S. Senate Watergate hearings.
- A bus crash killed 43 people in France when the vehicle missed a sharp turn on the steep Rampe de Laffrey road in the Isère département near Notre-Dame-de-Mésage, and fell 65 feet (20 m) into the Romanche river. The victims were from the town of Braine-le-Comte in Belgium and were returning from a pilgrimage to the shrine of Our Lady of La Salette.
- Died: Jack Hawkins, 62, British actor, died of throat cancer. Hawkins made 18 films after losing his voice following cancer surgery, but was so popular with fans that filmmakers used another actor, Charles Gray, to dub his voice as he mimed the lines.

== July 19, 1973 (Thursday) ==
- Two of the 12 crew of the Panamanian supply vessel Nordic Service died after the ship collided with the Finnish ship Finn Trader and sank off Great Yarmouth in the United Kingdom.

== July 20, 1973 (Friday) ==
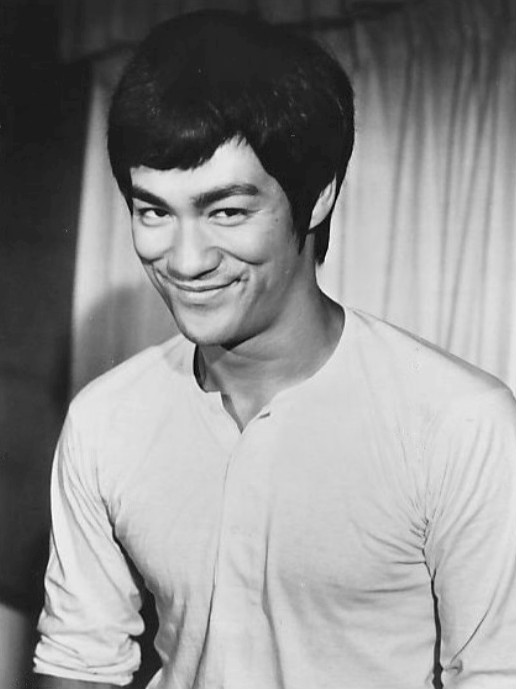
July 20, 1973: Martial arts film star Bruce Lee dies shortly before release of Enter the Dragon

- Japan Air Lines Flight 404 was hijacked by five terrorists as a member of the Japanese Red Army and four members of the Popular Front for the Liberation of Palestine combined to seize the Boeing 747 with 140 other people on board, shortly after it took off from Amsterdam in the Netherlands for a flight to Anchorage, Alaska in the U.S. One of the PFLP members was killed when her hand grenade exploded during the hijacking. The surviving hijackers forced the plane to fly to multiple destinations before landing in Libya at Benghazi, released the passengers and crew 89 hours after the hijacking began; and then blew up the airliner.
- Muammar Gaddafi announced his resignation as leader of Libya after his plans for uniting the north African nation with Egypt were rejected. He would reverse his decision three days later after his Cabinet announced that it would quit as well.
- Born:
  - King Haakon VIII of Norway, reigning Norwegian monarch since the 2026 death of King Harald V; in Oslo
  - Michael Ezra, Ugandan billionaire and philanthropist, founder of SunSpace International; in Kampala
- Died:
  - Bruce Lee (Lee Jun-fan), 32, U.S.-born Hong Kong martial artist and actor, less than a month before the August 19 U.S. release of his blockbuster film Enter the Dragon. Although speculation abounded that he had been killed by a move called "the vibrating palm", Lee's death was probably from an allergic reaction to the meprobamate, the active ingredient in the painkiller Equagesic.
  - Robert Smithson, 35, American sculptor and photographer, was killed along with a pilot in the crash of a small plane near Amarillo, Texas
  - Mikhail Isakovsky, 73, Soviet Russian poet and songwriter

== July 21, 1973 (Saturday) ==
- In a case of mistaken identity, Israeli Mossad agents assassinated a Moroccan waiter, Ahmed Bouchiki, in Lillehammer in Norway. The agents had confused Bouchiki with Ali Hassan Salameh, a leader of Black September's Munich Olympics massacre in 1972, who had been given shelter in Norway. Six Mossad agents were arrested by the Norwegian authorities and the incident, soon to be known as the "Lillehammer affair", forced Israel's Prime Minister Golda Meir to suspend the Mossad assassinations following the Munich massacre. While the Israeli government never accepted responsibility for the murder of Bouchiki, it would pay an unspecified amount of money to his family 23 years later, in 1996.
- France resumed atmospheric nuclear bomb tests in Mururoa Atoll, over the protests of Australia and New Zealand, with the explosion of an atomic bomb at 9:00 in the morning local time (1900 UTC).:
- The Mars 4 planetary orbiter was launched from the Soviet Union, with a goal of orbiting Mars in February 1974. On July 30, two of its onboard navigational computers failed while attempting to perform a course correction, and Mars 4 would only be able to perform a fly-by mission for six minutes.

== July 22, 1973 (Sunday) ==
- Pan Am Flight 816 crashed into the Pacific Ocean after takeoff from Tahiti, killing 78 of the 79 people on board.
- Born:
  - Rufus Wainwright, American-Canadian singer-songwriter; in Rhinebeck, New York
  - Jaime Camil, Mexican comedian and actor; in Mexico City

== July 23, 1973 (Monday) ==
- Ozark Air Lines Flight 809 crashed near Normandy, Missouri after encountering windshear in a thunderstorm while on approach to St. Louis International Airport in St. Louis, Missouri, killing 38 of the 44 people on board.
- U.S. President Richard Nixon refused to turn over the presidential tape recordings to the Senate Watergate committee or the special prosecutor. In a letter to the committee chairman, Senator Sam Ervin, Nixon wrote "I have considered your request that I permit your committee to have access to tapes of my private conversations with a number of my closest aides. I have concluded that the principles stated in my letter to you of July 6th preclude me from complying with that request, and I shall not do so."
- Born:
  - Nomar Garciaparra, American baseball player, 1997 American League (AL) Rookie of the Year and AL batting champion 1999 and 2000; in Whittier, California
  - Fran Healey, Scottish singer and musician for the rock band Travis; in Stafford, Staffordshire
  - Himesh Reshammiya, Indian actor, producer and singer; in Mumbai, Maharashtra state
- Died: Eddie Rickenbacker, 82, U.S. Army flying ace who later built Eastern Airlines into a major company.

== July 24, 1973 (Tuesday) ==
- The 1973 Major League Baseball All-Star Game was played at Kansas City, Missouri, and ended in a 7–1 victory for the all-stars of the National League.
- Darrell Cain, a policeman in Dallas, Texas, shot and killed a 12-year-old boy, Santos Rodriguez, after the boy was handcuffed and sitting in a police car. Cain, a white officer, was indicted for murder of Rodriguez, a Hispanic American child. Outrage in Dallas led days later to a peaceful demonstration that turned into a riot. Cain would be convicted of murder and serve 30 months of a five-year sentence.

== July 25, 1973 (Wednesday) ==
- The Soviet Mars 5 space probe was launched from Baikonur Cosmodrome. It would reach the planet Mars on February 12, 1974.
- Died:
  - Louis St. Laurent, 91, the 12th Prime Minister of Canada, from 1948 to 1957
  - Amy Jacques Garvey, 77, Jamaican-born African American journalist and publisher
  - Karanbahadur Rana, 74, Nepalese soldier in the service of the British Empire during World War I, recipient of the Victoria Cross for gallantry who served as a Gurkha soldier in World War I.

== July 26, 1973 (Thursday) ==
- The paramilitary group Patria y Libertad, commissioned by the navy of Chile to carry out sabotage operations against President Salvador Allende, assassinated Allende's Navy adviser, Arturo Araya Peeters. Captain Araya had stepped onto the balcony of his home in the Santiago suburb of Providencia when he was shot by a sniper from building across the street.
- The United States used its veto power in the United Nations Security Council after the UNSC members voted, 13 to 2 for a resolution that would have censured Israel for its failure to withdraw from the West Bank, the Sinai peninsula and the Golan Heights, territory gained in the 1967 Six-Day War. The veto was only the fifth ever for the U.S., but the fourth in the less than a year.
- Candidates of the United Kingdom's Liberal Party defeated challengers from the much larger Conservative and Labour parties to win both of the by-elections scheduled to fill vacancies in the House of Commons, winning the constituencies of Ripon and the Isle of Ely. The victories increased its presence in Commons from six seats to eight.
- In soccer, the Bangladesh national team played its first match ever, a 2–2 draw against Thailand at the Merdeka Cup tournament in Malaysia.
- Born: Kate Beckinsale, English film actress and model in London, as Kathrin Romany Beckinsale
- Died: Hans Albert Einstein, 69, Swiss-born American hydraulic engineering expert for whom the American Society of Civil Engineers (ASCE) established an annual award; he was also known for being the oldest son of Albert Einstein.

== July 27, 1973 (Friday) ==
- Operation End Sweep, the U.S. clearing of sea mines from the harbors of North Vietnam, came to an official end after having started on February 6. The minesweepers of U.S. Navy Task Force 78 departed North Vietnamese waters the next day to sail back to the Philippines.
- Died: Mimi Wong, 34, and her husband Sim Wor Kum, 40, Singaporean convicted murderers were both executed for the 1970 murder of Ayako Watanabe.

== July 28, 1973 (Saturday) ==
- The Summer Jam at Watkins Glen, a massive rock festival featuring the Grateful Dead, The Allman Brothers Band and The Band, took place at the Watkins Glen Grand Prix Raceway in New York, United States, attracting over 600,000 music fans, a record audience for the time.

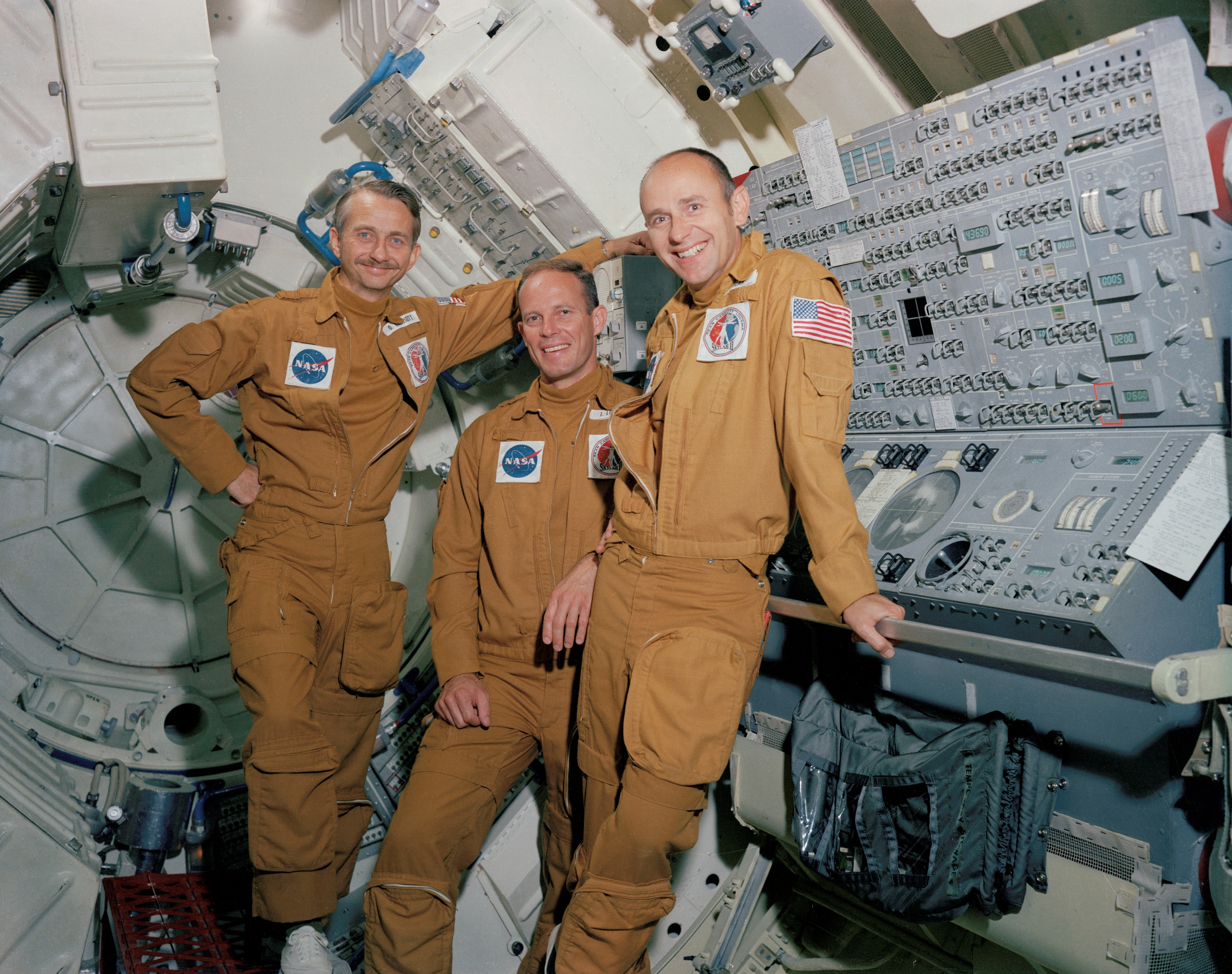
Skylab 3 astronauts Garriott, Lousma and Bean

- Skylab 3, with astronauts Alan Bean, Owen Garriott and Jack Lousma, was launched from the Kennedy Space Center in the United States, to conduct various medical and scientific experiments aboard Skylab.
- Voters in the Philippines endorsed the continuation of martial law after two days of a national referendum.
- A jet airplane landed on the continent of Antarctica for the first time, as the Patagonia, a Fokker F28, touched down at the Marambio Air Station on the Antarctic Peninsula, under the jurisdiction of Argentina.

== July 29, 1973 (Sunday) ==
- Voters in Greece abolished the monarchy in a nationwide vote taking place four weeks after Giorgios Papadopoulos declared himself as president and overthrew King Constantine II. The vote was more than 78% in favor of creating the Hellenic Republic.
- In the U.S., the Federal Reserve Bank of Minneapolis went through an elaborate early-morning procedure to transport its assets two and one-half blocks from its old location at 510 Marquette Avenue to its new headquarters at 250 Marquette Avenue in Minneapolis, Minnesota. The move of five billion dollars ($5,000,000,000) in currency, coins and securities took place between 2 a.m. and 6:30 a.m. after city police sealed off the 12-block area around both buildings and 76 policemen, U.S. Secret Service agents and U.S. Federal Reserve Bank security guards patrolled the area.

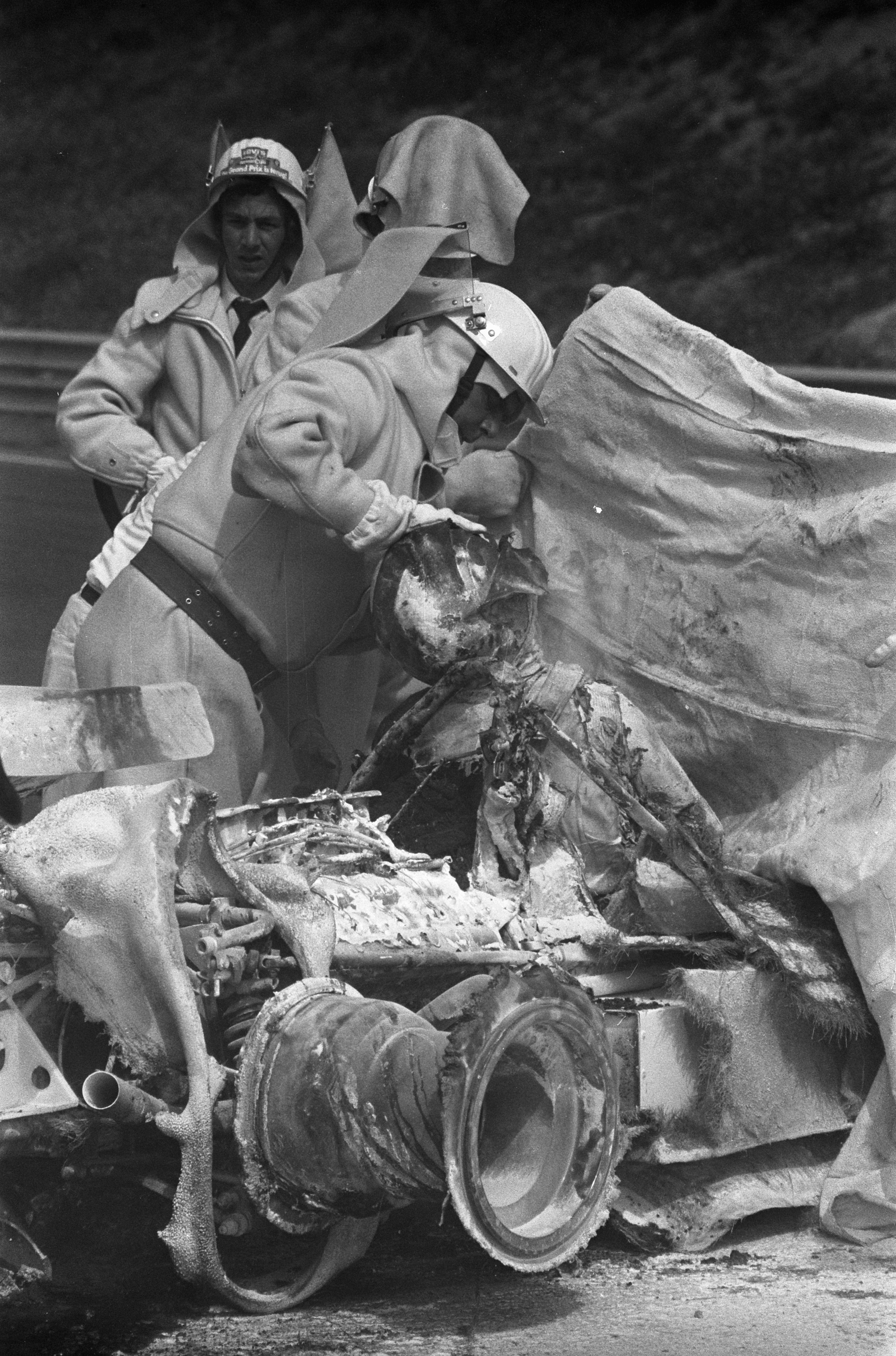
July 29, 1973: Aftermath of Roger Williamson's accident

- The 1973 Dutch Grand Prix was won by Jackie Stewart. British driver Roger Williamson was killed during the race, in an accident witnessed live on European television. His fellow driver David Purley was later awarded the George Medal for his unsuccessful attempts to save Williamson.
- Died: Henri Charrière, 66, French escaped convict and writer, died of throat cancer.

== July 30, 1973 (Monday) ==
- Compensation of 20 million pounds sterling was paid to victims of Thalidomide following an 11-year court case.
- Eighteen coal miners were killed at the coal mine near Staveley, Derbyshire, UK, when the brake mechanism on their elevator cage failed as they were descending underground.
- The strangled body of 20-year-old Ronnie Wiebe was discarded beside an entrance ramp to the 405 Freeway, two days after the young man had disappeared. Welt marks on Wiebe's wrists and ankles suggest that he had been bound and suspended from a device before his murder. Wiebe would later be identified as one of the victims of serial killer Randy Steven Kraft, the so-called "Freeway Killer".
- Born:
  - Markus Näslund, Swedish professional ice hockey left wing for the Sweden national team, as well as in the Svenska Hockeyligan and North America's National Hockey League; in Örnsköldsvik
  - Sonu Nigam, Indian singer and film artist; in Faridabad, Haryana state

== July 31, 1973 (Tuesday) ==
- Delta Air Lines Flight 723, with 83 passengers and six crew, crashed while attempting to land at Boston's Logan Airport runway in poor visibility, striking a sea wall about 165 feet (50 m) to the right of the runway centerline and about 3,000 feet (910 m) short. All 89 people on board died as a result of the crash; one passenger initially survived but died from his injuries on December 11.
- Militant Unionist protesters led by Ian Paisley disrupted the first sitting of the Northern Ireland Assembly.
- London's famous Tower Bridge was shut down by police after a stockbroker's clerk flew an airplane twice between its towers, below a pedestrian walkway and 15 feet (4.6 m) above traffic, then turned toward the "buzzing" motor vehicles on the main roadway and by high rise buildings. Peter Martin, out on bail after being arrested for fraud for dealings on the London Stock Exchange, had told his wife that he intended to commit suicide. He took off from the Blackbushe airport in Camberley, Surrey, and threatened to fly the Beagle Pup plane into a building. After two hours, Martin flew the plane toward the Lake District National Park, and was killed when he dived his plane into a forest near Keswick, Cumbria.
- Born: Scott Moe, Canadian politician, Premier of Saskatchewan since 2018; in Prince Albert, Saskatchewan
