= Dichogaster =

Scientific classification
- Kingdom: Animalia
- Phylum: Annelida
- Clade: Pleistoannelida
- Clade: Sedentaria
- Class: Clitellata
- Order: Opisthopora
- Family: Octochaetidae
- Genus: Dichogaster; Csuzdi, 1996

Genus of annelid worms

Dichogaster is a genus of annelids belonging to the family Acanthodrilidae.

The species of this genus are found in Southern America, Africa and Eastern Asia. At least one species, Dichogaster bolaui, has been found to be a domicole, inhabiting human dwellings, and several others inhbabit tank bromeliads, including D. bromeliocola, D. johnsoni, and D. sydneyi in Jamaica and Dichogaster arborea, D. caesitifusca, D. callaina, D. girija, and D. basseterrensis in Guadeloupe.

Species:

- Dichogaster spec Csuzdi & Sherlock, 2015
