= Microscolex =

Scientific classification
- Domain: Eukaryota
- Kingdom: Animalia
- Phylum: Annelida
- Clade: Pleistoannelida
- Clade: Sedentaria
- Class: Clitellata
- Order: Opisthopora
- Suborder: Lumbricina
- Family: Acanthodrilidae
- Genus: Microscolex; Rosa, 1887

Synonyms
- Photodrilus Giard, 1887

Genus of annelids

Microscolex is a genus of annelids belonging to the family Acanthodrilidae. The genus has cosmopolitan distribution.

Species:

- Microscolex algeriensis Beddard, 1892
- Microscolex anderssoni Michaelsen, 1905
- Microscolex aquarumdulcium (Beddard, 1893)
- Microscolex beddardi (Rosa, 1895)
- Microscolex benhami (Eisen, 1893)
- Microscolex bovei (Rosa, 1889)
