= Diplocardia longa =

Scientific classification
- Kingdom: Animalia
- Phylum: Annelida
- Clade: Pleistoannelida
- Clade: Sedentaria
- Class: Clitellata
- Order: Opisthopora
- Suborder: Lumbricina
- Family: Acanthodrilidae
- Genus: Diplocardia
- Species: D. longa

Binomial name
- Diplocardia longa Moore, 1904

Species of annelid worm

Diplocardia longa is a species of earthworm native to North America. It was first described by the American zoologist John Percy Moore in 1904. The type locality is Hawkinsville, Georgia. This worm has bioluminescent properties; its body fluids and the sticky slime it exudes when stimulated emit a bluish glow.

== Description ==
Diplocardia longa can grow to a length of about 275 mm (11 in) when moderately extended and a diameter of 5 millimetres (0.20 in) at segment 7 and 4 millimetres (0.16 in) behind the clitellum. The number of segments varies between about 270 and 330. It is slender and cylindrical, slightly tapering at both ends. At the posterior end it swells slightly into a club-shape before narrowing to the anal opening. The two ends of the worm are brown, the clitellum reddish-brown and the rest of the body is a rather dull salmon pink. The skin is translucent and the veins can be seen distinctly in the less-pigmented regions.

== Bioluminescence ==
This worm produces bioluminescent mucus, its family Acanthodrilidae being one of three families of oligochaetes that exhibit bioluminescence. The light is produced in the coelomic fluid and is emitted when a luciferin called N-isovaleryl-3-amino-propanal is acted on by a peroxidase-like luciferase. This is a copper-containing protein which reacts with the hydrogen peroxide that is produced by another enzyme in the presence of oxygen. Strong stimulation of the worm causes fluid to be exuded from the worm's mouth, dorsal pores and anus. Light is emitted by certain large cells in this fluid when they rupture, and the worm is visible as a dark silhouette against the luminous slime. It has been suggested that when the worm is attacked by a predator such as the eastern mole, it can writhe and squirm and produce the slime, perhaps causing the mole to retreat from the bright light while the worm escapes.
