= Diplocardia =

Scientific classification
- Domain: Eukaryota
- Kingdom: Animalia
- Phylum: Annelida
- Clade: Pleistoannelida
- Clade: Sedentaria
- Class: Clitellata
- Order: Opisthopora
- Suborder: Lumbricina
- Family: Acanthodrilidae
- Genus: Diplocardia; Garmon, 1888

Species
- 52+, see text

Genus of annelid worms

Diplocardia is a genus of North American (USA, Mexico) earthworms with 52-57 known species that is remarkably similar to Australian Diplotrema Spencer, 1900.

Species include Diplocardia pettiboneae (Gates 1977) and Diplocardia longa (Moore 1904), with bioluminescent mucus.

The second largest earthworm in North America is Diplocardia meansi (Gates 1977) and is endemic to Rich Mountain in the Ouachita Mountains.
