= Neodiplotrema =

Scientific classification
- Kingdom: Animalia
- Phylum: Platyhelminthes
- Class: Trematoda
- Order: Plagiorchiida
- Family: Didymozoidae
- Tribe: Gonapodasmiini
- Genus: Neodiplotrema; Yamaguti, 1938

Genus of worms

Neodiplotrema is a genus of flatworms belonging to the family Didymozoidae.

Species:

- Neodiplotrema pelamydis (Yamaguti, 1938)
