= Maxine Linehan =

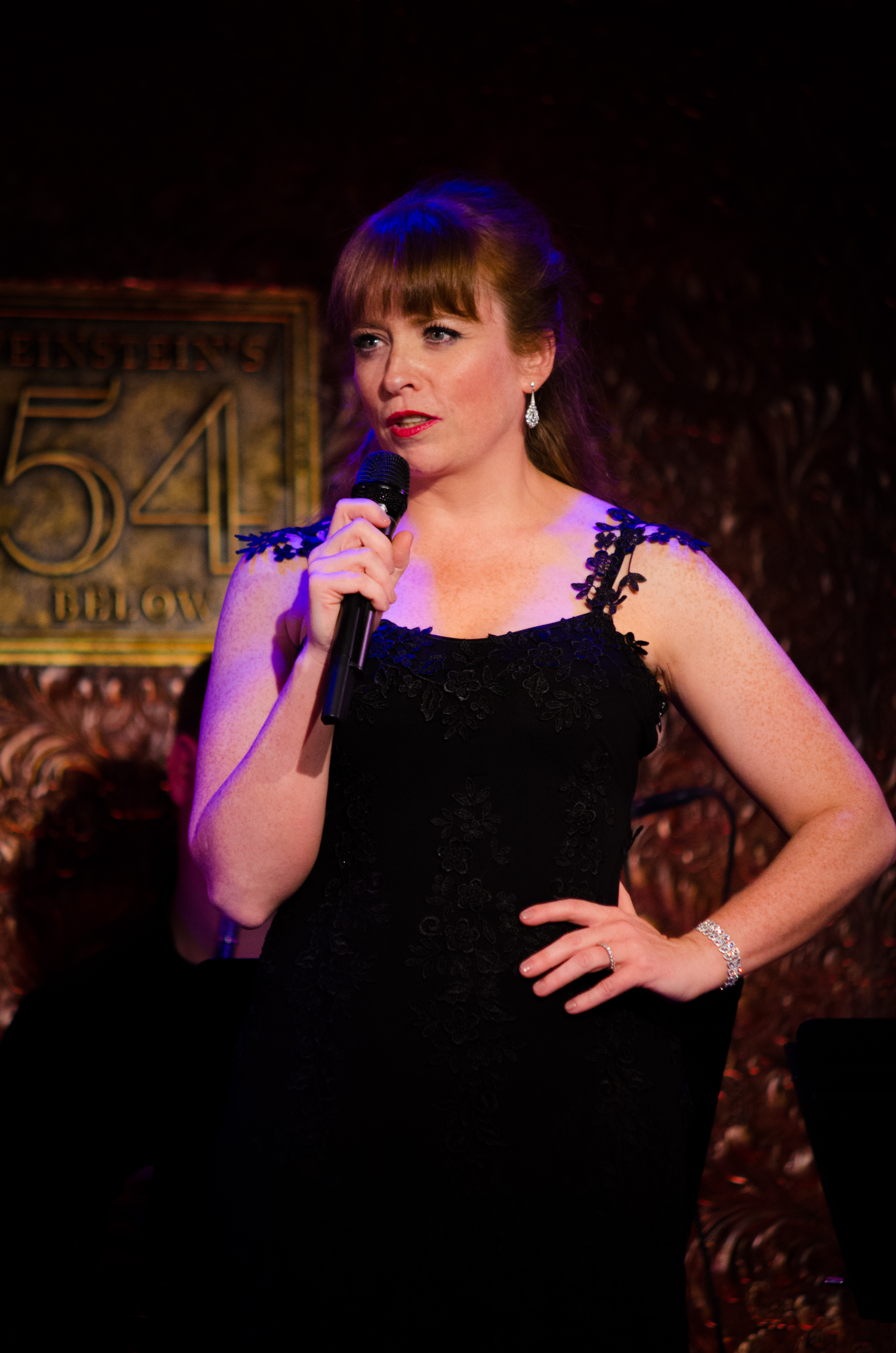
- Born: Maxine Therese Linehan; July 9, 1973 (age 52); Newry, Northern Ireland
- Education: University of London, Inns of Court School of Law
- Occupations: Singer; songwriter; actress
- Spouse: Andrew Koss (m. 2009)
- Children: 2
- Musical career
- Genres: Traditional Pop; Pop; Broadway; Country Crossover
- Instrument: Vocals
- Years active: 2005–present
- Website: maxinelinehan.com

Maxine Therese Linehan is an Irish and American singer-songwriter and stage actress. Born in Newry, Northern Ireland, she performed as Nancy in Oliver! in the UK, touring it in Ireland and England with the Irish Operatic Repertory Company. Her job as a barrister in London took her to New York City in 2001, and six years later, she created an autobiographical show, So Far... which garnered her her first MAC Award nomination. In 2008, she co-founded the Alloy Theater Company with Michelle Pruett and starred in its production of Andrew Lloyd Webber's song cycle Tell Me on a Sunday, Jacqueline McCarrick's The Mushroom Pickers, and the company' first off-Broadway production, William Luce's Brontë: A Portrait of Charlotte.

Linehan played the Nurse in the first U.S. tour of Bartlett Sher's Tony Award-winning revival of South Pacific in 2009 and 2010. Her frequent collaborations with writer-director Scott Siegel have yielded Maxine Linehan: An American Journey, "Beautiful Songs: An Evening of Music for the Soul and the Senses," One: The Songs of U2, and with other performers the Broadway by the Year series and Broadway Ballyhoo. Linehan's albums are What Would Petula Do? (2010), Maxine Linehan: An American Journey (2014), Beautiful Songs (2015), and This Time of Year (2020). She has performed at the Town Hall, Lincoln Center, Ars Nova, Birdland, and Théâtre du Châtelet in Paris, and also collaborates with her husband Andrew Koss. She been written about in Billboard, the New York Times, the Village Voice, the Huffington Post, the New York Post, Irish Central, and USA Today.

== Early life, education, and career ==
Born in Newry, Northern Ireland on July 9, 1973, the eldest of four to Maureen (née McAnulty) Linehan and Patrick Gabriel Linehan, Maxine Therese Linehan was raised in County Cork, Republic of Ireland, and performed as a child. She visited the U.S. for the first time at age 12 and wrote about the experience years later:

"I came back thinking, someday I’ll live there. For me, freedom was just in the air here. I grew up in a town where everyone looked the same, everyone believed in the same thing. I wanted to be in a place where you could be different. Now, I’m not that different and I didn’t NEED to immigrate to save my life or escape persecution, I just wanted to be in a place that allowed you to be you."

At age 17 she had a role in The Sound of Music produced by the Irish Operatic Repertory Company at Cork Opera House in Cork and played Nancy in Oliver! for the same company. She performed both roles again at Wycombe Swan Theater in High Wycombe, England. She told a New York Irish-American paper in 2015, however, "Theater is not considered a steady career back home. So I went to law school."

She was awarded a Bachelor of Laws from the University of London and graduated from the Inns of Court School of Law. She also studied performance at The London Academy of Music and Dramatic Art.

Linehan was called to the bar in the U.K. capital and worked for a law firm there which moved her, in 2001, to New York City. While this U.S. office closed within a few years, she decided to stay in the city and devote herself to musical performance.

== Career ==
=== Theater career ===
In the 2007, Linehan created an autobiographical 90-minute cabaret show So Far... which played at the Metropolitan Room in New York City, for which she was nominated a MAC Award. The next year, she co-founded the Alloy Theater Company with Michelle Pruett: The two met while waitressingh at a Del Frisco's in New York City. That same year, Linehan starred in its production of Andrew Lloyd Webber's song cycle, Tell Me on a Sunday at the Laurie Beechman Theatre in Manhattan. She appeared in Alloy's production of fellow Irish woman Jacqueline McCarrick's The Mushroom Pickers in 2009. The play is about a London actress who returns home to County Monaghan, joining her widower father to work in the mushroom tunnels.

In 2009 and 2010, Linehan was part of the ensemble in the first U.S. tour of Bartlett Sher's Tony Award-winning revival of South Pacific, which premiered in San Francisco, and travelled to Chicago, Charlotte, North Carolina, and Des Moines, Iowa. In 2010, Linehan played Charlotte Brontë in the Alloy Theater Company's production of Brontë: A Portrait of Charlotte. Written in 1983 by William Luce, an American, it is based on the correspondence between Brontë and her childhood friend Ellen Nussey. Linehan said that she read the play in one sitting and conducted her own research into Brontë's background to prepare for the part. The production, directed by theater veteran Timothy Douglas, was the company's first official Off-Broadway production and ran for seven months.

In summer 2014 Linehan was part of Siegel's two-act Broadway Ballyhoo with Mark Nadler and others.

=== Music career ===
Linehan's first single was a cover of Lesley Gore's "You Don't Own Me" with rapper Phil Phlaymz. She performed a concert of Petula Clark's music in 2009 at the Laurie Beechman which included "Downtown", "Don’t Sleep on the Subway," and "Call Me." Her performances of the same material, including at the album release party that year and at least one performance in 2010 at the Tainted Blue studios in Manhattan, coincided with the release of her album, What Would Petula Do?: A Tribute to Petula Clark in which Linehan sings and references the music of the '60s singer and others of the era, which she grew up listening to at home. The album's title track was written by Linehan's musical director Gerald Stockstill with Ken Jones. The album was produced by her husband Andrew Koss and Gerald Stockstill engineered by Chach and was reviewed favorably. Linehan revived the concert in 2015 at the Metropolitan Room and for the New York Cabaret's Greatest Hits series and again in 2019 at Adelphi University Performing Arts Center in 2019.

The Town Hall presented a sold-out The Broadway Musicals of 1940–1964 created and directed by Scott Siegel as part of the Broadway by the Year series, in its 14th year, featuring Linehan among the performers. She subsequently appeared in every one of the yearly events: The 15th celebrated the musicals from 1991 to 2015, the 16th the musicals of the 1970s, the 17th the musicals from the Aughts, the 18th the musicals of 1956 and 1975, the 19th the musicals of 1987 and 2015.

Linehan premiered the solo performance, Maxine Linehan: An American Journey, created and directed by Siegel, in 2013 at Birdland, which sold out and moved to Times Square's Terminus Recording Studios the next year, with her husband, Andrew Koss, on guitar. The one-hour show is about her story of leaving Ireland for America and her development there. In it, the Irish Echo wrote Linehan "has some pertinent things to say (and sing) about the experience. And sing she does, often electrifyingly well, in a show that’s by turns intimate and epic, just like the city in which she makes her home" and Stephen Hanks of BroadwayWorld wrote, "I could go the rest of my life without hearing Stephen Sondheim's "What More Do I Need?" from Saturday Night, or "Pure Imagination" from Willy Wonka in another cabaret show, but, thankfully, Linehan's renditions were lovely and entertaining".

In fall 2014 she debuted the Siegel-written and -directed "Beautiful Songs: An Evening of Music for the Soul and the Senses" at the Metropolitan Room on West 22nd Street in New York. The show, which includes "Danny Boy" and original songs like "There Won't Be Trumpets/A Quiet Thing" and Koss's "I Think Of You" representing a range of genres from Broadway, folk, and pop was reviewed favorably the following year by the New York Times's Stephen Holden, with his describing her as "self-assured, fiercely talented" and "grounded." In October 2014, Linehan performed in Quiet Please, There's a Lady on Stage, a concert celebrating American cabaret performer Julie Wilson's 90th birthday as part of the 25th Annual New York Cabaret Convention at Jazz at Lincoln Center. Her performances of "Something Better Than This" (from Sweet Charity) and Noël Coward's "Sail Away" were lauded by Hanks. She repeated the Wilson show at 54 Below the next year. Broadway Ballyhoo, Beautiful Songs, Linehan and Siegal were nominated for that year's BroadwayWorld.com New York Cabaret Awards.

She released her third album Beautiful Songs in 2015, which she later described as "a traditional pop vocal album that's mostly American songbook." It was co-produced and arranged by Ryan Shirar, and he also performed on it. USA Today's Elysa Gardner called "There Won't Be Trumpets," "an inspired medley celebrating the kind of romantic love that endures." Linehan sang the closing song "The House I Live In" at the Sinatra-Thon at the Cutting Room in May. BroadwayWorld's Alix Cohen called it "a stirring anthem in her capable hands" but also wrote that she "long[ed] for a pullback enhancing emotional impact." The next month Linehan performed in Grounded for Life: The Musical, book by Pat Hazell and Bill Habeeb, lyrics by Lawrence Goldberg and Hazell. The act Beautiful Songs moved to supper club Feinsteins/54 Below.

That same year, she created a video tribute with her husband to the New York Mets' Daniel Murphy with a rewrite of "Danny Boy" called "Oh, Danny Boy!" It garnered more than 23,000 views on YouTube in a few days. Linehan was also included in the concert Edith Piaf: An All-Star Tribute produced, written, and hosted by Siegel, which was recommended in June 2015 as one of the "Top 5 N.Y. shows" the week of its run by NJ.com. She also revived her Petula Clark act in Siegal's 54 Sings Broadway's Greatest Hit Songs (which ran through 2019) and was described by BroadwayWorld's Billy Roe "could certainly be considered one [of] the best [cabaret shows] of this or any year." Linehan performed other material for his The Greatest Pop Songs Of All Time – Volume 1 and also participated in a 40-person choir and multi-piece orchestra, directed by Garrett Taylor, for "Songs of Inspiration: Broadway Goes to Church!" at St. Paul the Apostle Church in celebration of the Pope Francis's visit to New York City.

In 2016, Linehan performed an all-U2 show called One: The Songs of U2 at the BirdLand Theatre and recorded a single around it that forwarded all proceeds from both to the Broadway Cares/Equity Fights AIDS. The production was based around the U2 hit, whose title Holden of the New York Times wrote "leads many to assume it’s a hymn of unity, Ms. Linehan pointed out, is really a song about a couple breaking up." Supported by Brian Charles Rooney and Tony Award nominee Jarrod Spector, other songs include "Sunday Bloody Sunday," "Beautiful Day," "Where the Streets Have No Name." She appeared in Siegal's The Greatest Pop Songs Of All Time – Volume 4. She performed Beautiful Songs at the Players' Club Playhouse in Detroit in May.

She sold out a performance of "What Would Petula Do?" at the Théâtre du Châtelet in Paris in May 2016, and Feinstein's/54 Below in New York City. Having obtained U.S. citizenship in 2013, Linehan voted in the U.S. for the first time in 2016 and wrote about the experience on Medium, saying, "It was not fun. In fact it was frustrating beyond anything I imagined. I have wanted to break my television on many occasions." She continued to perform Maxine Linehan's One in 2017 and 2018, in addition to participating in a concert around the music of Billy Joel, produced, written, and hosted by Siegel, at Feinstein's/54 Below.

That same year Linehan released a single written with Koss in support of Everytown for Gun Safety, "Living Proof (You're Gonna Hear Us Now)," recorded at their studio at Strawberry Fields Lane in Manchester, Vermont. In early 2019, she was a featured vocalist in "More About the Melody: Celtic Night – Songs of Ireland and Scotland" hosted by cellist Mairi Dorman-Phaneuf and appeared in the Siegal-produced "Frank Sinatra – The Second Century – A Celebration of Sinatra's Timeless Hit Songs." She next appeared in the 19th edition of Broadway Unplugged at Merkin Concert Hall, brought her Petula Clark show to Gainesville, Georgia, and in 2020, the Siegel produced concert, "The Great American Songbook."

== Discography ==
- What Would Petula Do?: A Tribute to Petula Clark (2010)
- Maxine Linehan: An American Journey (2014)
- Beautiful Songs (2015)
- This Time of Year (2020)

== Distinctions ==
- MAC Award nomination, 2016, for recording for Beautiful Songs
- MAC Award nominations, 2015, for female vocalist in Beautiful Songs and for recording for American Journey
- BroadwayWorld.com's New York Cabaret Awards for Best Vocalist, Female (Non-Celebrity) and Best Show, Female for Beautiful Songs, 2014
- MAC Award nomination, 2007, for So Far...

== Memberships ==
- The National Academy of Recording Arts and Sciences, voting member
