= Octochaetus =

Scientific classification
- Domain: Eukaryota
- Kingdom: Animalia
- Phylum: Annelida
- Clade: Pleistoannelida
- Clade: Sedentaria
- Class: Clitellata
- Order: Opisthopora
- Family: Megascolecidae
- Genus: Octochaetus

Genus of annelids

Octochaetus is a genus of earthworms of family Octochaetidae native to Australia, New Zealand, and Malaysia.

== Classification ==
Cladogram from Catalogue of Life:

- Octochaetus
  - Octochaetus antarcticus
  - Octochaetus brucei
  - Octochaetus huttoni
  - Octochaetus kapitiensis
  - Octochaetus levis
  - Octochaetus michaelseni
  - Octochaetus microchaetus
  - Octochaetus multiporus
  - Octochaetus pelorus
  - Octochaetus ravus
  - Octochaetus sylvestris
  - Octochaetus thomasi
  - Octochaetus tricystis
