= Death of Janice Marie Young =

Unidentified murder victim for 42 years

Janice Marie Young
- Photograph of Janice Marie Young
- Born: Janice Marie Brock; June 17, 1957
- Disappeared: c. 1973; Newport News, Virginia, US
- Died: June 9, 1973 (aged 15); St. Petersburg, Florida, United States
- Cause of death: Road traffic incident
- Known for: Formerly unidentified decedent
- Height: Between 5 ft 1 in (1.55 m) and 5 ft 6 in (1.68 m)

Janice Marie Young (born Janice Marie Brock and known primarily by her middle name) was a formerly unidentified American girl who was pushed into the path of a moving vehicle on June 9, 1973.

A man (Lawrence Dorn) was arrested for her murder, but the charge against him was eventually dropped, as the suspect's "intent could not be proven."

The victim was identified on May 20, 2015, nearly 42 years after her death, after Young's biological younger brother, Timothy Young, noticed similarities between the unidentified victim and the circumstances surrounding his runaway sister. The match was then confirmed through DNA.

== Physical description and circumstances ==
At around 1:00 AM on June 9, 1973, a teenage girl was seen arguing with a man at the intersection of 11th Avenue South and 8th Street South in St. Petersburg, Florida. She was armed with a knife and a broken bottle. The man, later identified as Lawrence Dorn, shoved her into the path of a moving truck, stating this was an act of self defense. She died at the scene.

The victim appeared to be between 14 and 16 years old, but may have been as young as 11 or as old as 20. Her hair was auburn, wavy, and shoulder-length. Her eyes were noted as a distinctive shade of blue. She had noticeably short fingernails, which is consistent with nail biting. Other distinctive features were three birthmarks on her back, a chipped tooth, no visible dental work, and freckles on her shoulders. It is possible that her tooth was chipped as a result of being struck by the vehicle.

The victim had two earrings in one ear, and a piercing in her other ear that had healed. She wore a ring that was missing its stone. At the time of her death, she was wearing a multicolored dress and purple tights.

== Investigation ==
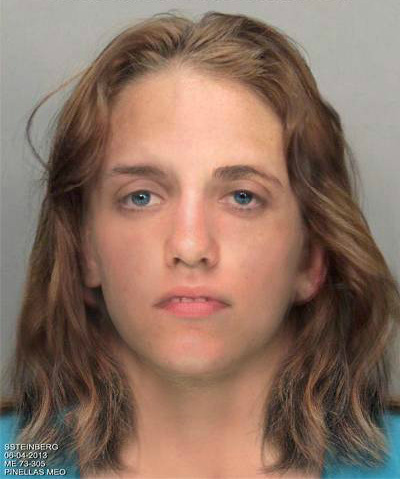
Facial reconstruction of the victim. Her brother, Timothy Young, recognized her as his sister.

"To Gloria, ...call Mark and say hello and also that I was planning on going to see Mark in Virginia... Signed, Marie"
- Text written in Janice Young's unfinished letter.

It was strongly believed that the deceased girl was a runaway. It was known that she had been given clothing by other people, indicating she had little in the way of belongings.

She had been spoken to by police officers shortly before her death. These officers believed that she was not the person whom they were trying to locate at that time. She had given various alias names during previous confrontations, using her birth name as well as the first names of "Cindy", "Maria" and "Marie" and the last name of "Bromke."

It was suspected that she was involved with the illegal drug trade and that this may have been a motive for her death.

Among her possessions was a letter written in pencil with the name "Gloria" on it. The letter said that she was "on break," which led to speculation that she may have had a job at the time. It also made references to people whom she had met in the states of North Carolina and Virginia. The penmanship was said to be poor, and no address was on the envelope.

Dorn was arrested and charged with the victim's murder. Eventually, this was reduced to manslaughter, but charges were later dropped and the criminal case was closed. The reason was that police were unable to "prove [Dorn's] intent" when he pushed Young.

She was buried in Memorial Park Cemetery in St. Petersburg, Florida. In 2010, her body was exhumed from an unmarked grave to obtain a DNA sample, in the hope that it would aid in identifying her.

== Identification ==
Janice Marie Young was identified on May 20, 2015. Timothy Young, her younger brother, had reportedly searched for decades for his missing sister. He had been using her adoptive name, "Young", when making this search. When he made an Internet search using Janice's birth name (Brock), he found a police sketch of the victim, which bore a strong resemblance to Janice. He subsequently reported this to police by telephone on January 28, 2015.

Investigator Brenda Stephenson was faxed documents regarding the adoption of Janice and Timothy. She stated that she knew immediately that Janice was the unidentified girl after reading her name on the documents. Janice's DNA was later compared with that found in the victim's remains and proved to be a positive match. The two siblings had lived in foster care after being taken from the custody of their parents. Their family name was changed from "Brock" to "Young" after they were legally adopted in 1969.

Janice had run away from her adoptive parents' home in Newport News, Virginia, after being raped by an adoptive sibling; her brother had witnessed the rape. She told her brother of her intention of running away, packed a pillow case with belongings, left the home, and did not return.

Her remains were eventually transported to her brother for cremation.
