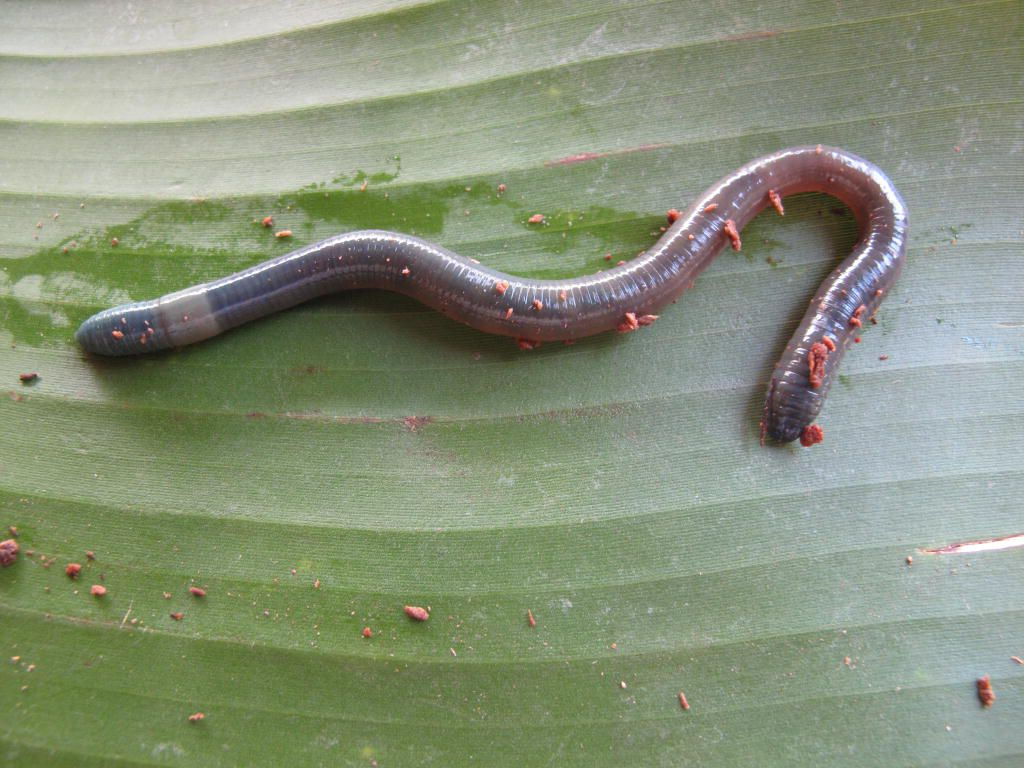

Scientific classification
- Kingdom: Animalia
- Phylum: Annelida
- Clade: Pleistoannelida
- Clade: Sedentaria
- Class: Clitellata
- Order: Opisthopora
- Suborder: Crassiclitellata
- Family: Octochaetidae; Michaelsen, 1900

= Octochaetidae =

Family of annelid worms

Octochaetidae is a family of annelids belonging to the order Haplotaxida.

== Genera ==
Genera:

- Agastrodrilus Omodeo & Vaillaud, 1967
- Bahlia Gates, 1945
- Benhamia Michaelsen, 1889
- Benhamiona Csuzdi & Zicsi, 1994
- Calebiella Gates, 1945
- Celeriella Gates, 1958
- Dashiella Julka, 1988
- Dichogaster Beddard, 1888
- Erythraeodrilus Stephenson, 1915
- Eudichogaster Michaelsen, 1902
- Eutrigaster Cognetti, 1904
- Eutyphoeus Michaelsen, 1900
- Guineoscolex Csuzdi & Zicsi, 1994
- Herbettodrilus Julka, Blanchart & Chapuis-Lardy, 2004
- Hoplochaetella Michaelsen, 1900
- Karmiella Julka, 1983
- Konkadrilus Julka, 1988
- Kotegeharia Julka, 1988
- Lennogaster Gates, 1939
- Mallehulla Julka, 1982
- Millsonia Beddard, 1894
- Monothecodrilus Csuzdi & Zicsi, 1994
- Neogaster Černosvitov, 1934
- Octochaetoides Michaelsen, 1922
- Octochaetus Beddard, 1893
- Omodeona Sims, 1967
- Pellogaster Gates, 1939
- Pickfordia Omodeo, 1958
- Priodoscolex Gates, 1940
- Ramiella Stephenson, 1921
- Ramiellona Michaelsen, 1935
- Rillogaster Gates, 1939
- Senapatiella Julka, Blanchart & Chapuis-Lardy, 2004
- Shimodrilus Julka, Blanchart & Chapuis-Lardy, 2004
- Trigaster Benham, 1886
- Wahoscolex Julka, 1988
- Wegeneriella Michaelsen, 1933
- Wegeneriona Černosvitov, 1939
