= Earthworms as invasive species =

Earthworms are invasive species which conquer environments across the globe. Of a total of around 3,700 described species of earthworms, about 120 of these species are known as peregrine, and are found across the globe.

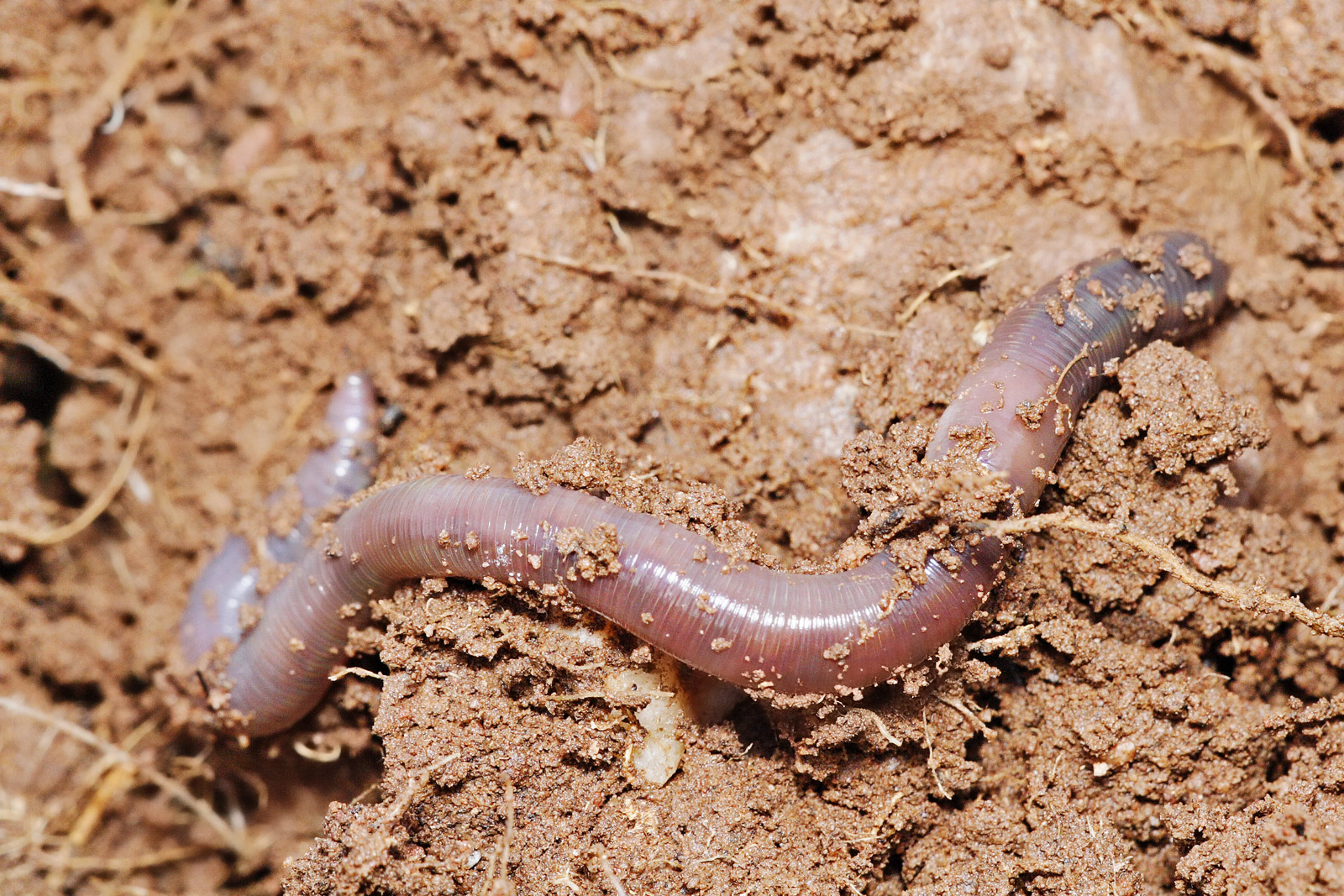
Image of earthworm in dirt

Peregrine earthworms are worms that have invaded regions which they are not native to, which deems them invasive species. The increase in trade among a variety of continents and countries could be a contributing factor to the invasion of exotic earthworms outside of their natural habitat. Invasive earthworms can cause harm to their new environment through soil and plant transportation, and carrying pathogens like viruses, and spores of plant pathogens. Peregrine earthworms invade different regions by way of transportation of plants and soils, in intentional and unintentional ways.

== Jumping worms ==
Peregrine pheretimoid earthworms are an invasive type of earthworm known as jumping worms which commonly impact their invaded environments negatively. These earthworms are native to Australia and Eastern Asia, and belong to the Megascolecidae family, and result within 3 genera: amynthas, metaphire, and pheretima.

== Invasions in Europe ==
=== United Kingdom and Ireland ===
Between 69 and 70 different species of earthworms under the Oligochaete subclass have been discovered and recorded as of 2008 in the United Kingdom, and Ireland. These earthworms have made their way to this area by traveling with plants from places such as the Middle-East, and the Bahamas. Some have been reported to have come from Japan, New Zealand, North America, Africa, and Islands among the Caribbean Sea. Transportation through soil was a common method of invasion in many of these species to the UK and Ireland.

In Great Britain, many of these species have found their way to Kew Gardens in London. These non-native earthworms were inadvertently introduced to England by means of plants and animals from other countries that were not meant to reach the UK. In 2007, the Gardens conducted an earthworm extraction to observe the species which resided in the glasshouses. This resulted in the discovery of an additional 2 species that had not yet been recorded in the gardens.

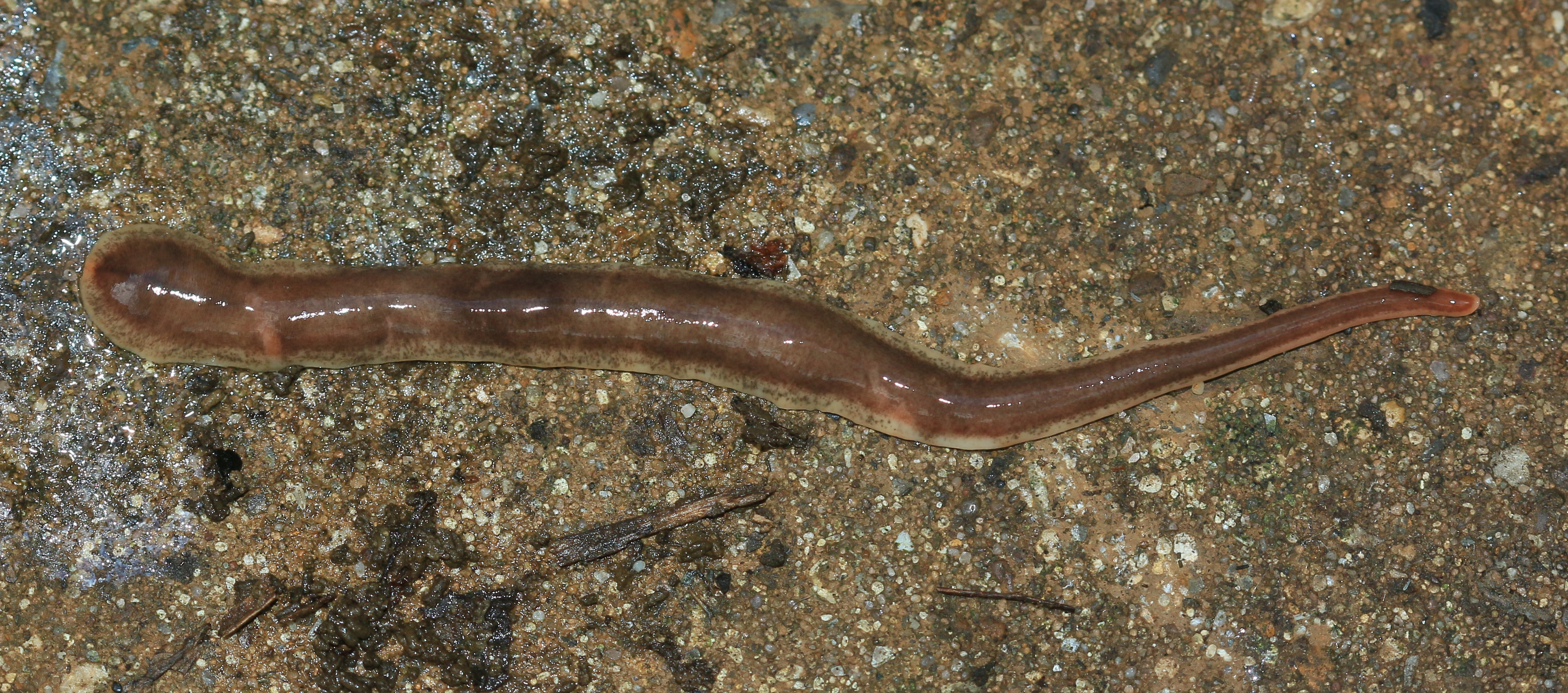
New Zealand Flatworm (Arthurdendyus triangulatus)

A recent threat to earthworm populations in the UK is the New Zealand flatworm (Arthurdendyus triangulatus), which feeds upon earthworms such as lumbricids. Around the time this species was discovered in the UK, there was a decline in other earthworm populations. Their invasion may have been related to horticultural trade between different locations. It was also suggested that some earthworms have been able to survive the invasion of A. triangulatus because they burrow deep enough into the soil to be unaffected.

== Invasions in Australia ==
=== Australia ===
As of 2019, there were around 1,000 species known to be native to Australia within 3 different families. Exotic species not native to Australia are commonly found in agricultural environments along with persistent natives. By 1999, 66 invasive species had been discovered in Australia, about half of which were lumbricids found in the British Isles. These worms found have found their way into Australian ecosystems by earlier settlers, carrying fruit trees and shrubs. In addition, around 44 species native to Australia were imported to Scotland to assist reducing peat turf mats. Peat is a layer of thick, organic soil, which assists in agricultural processes because of its ability to store carbon and water.

== Invasions in North America ==
Approximately 182 earthworm taxa in twelve families are reported from the United States and Canada, of which sixty (about 33%) are introduced. There are at least 45 exotic species that are north of Mexico. Only two genera of lumbricid earthworms are indigenous to North America while introduced genera have spread to areas without any native species, especially in the north where forest ecosystems rely on a large amount of undecayed leaf matter. When worms decompose that leaf layer, the ecology may shift making the habitat unsurvivable for certain species of trees, ferns and herbs. Larger earthworms such as the nightcrawler Lumbricus terrestris, L. rubellus and the Alabama (natively Asian) jumper, Amynthas agrestis, can be eaten by adult salamanders, which is beneficial for their populations. However, they are too large for juvenile salamanders to consume, which results in a net loss in salamander population.

== Invasions in South America ==
=== Brazil ===
Brazil has been invaded by peregrine earthworms for a period of time which is currently unknown, however, there have been known invasions of exotic earthworms since 1867. Of the 306 earthworm species known in Brazil, 255 are thought to be native to the region, and close to 51 are exotic. 8 of these invasive species possess the ability to control the region they invade, which impacts the soil content, therefore affecting the current organisms inhabiting the soil.

==== Common uses ====
The invasive earthworms species Pontoscolex corethrunus, is commonly used and sold as fishing bait. Other additional Amynthas species are used for this as well. Vermiculture is a common use for certain Lumbricidae, such as Eisenia fetida, and E. andrei . Vermiculture is a method of waste management where earthworms and microorganism change this organic material into a usable form.

== Invasions in Asia ==
=== Origins ===
Many earthworm species are known to have originated in Asia, and have spread to other continents.

=== East Asia ===
In Taiwan, Pontoscolex corethrurus is known invasive with evidence of it displacing native worms. Eudrilus eugeniae has potential to do the same. For vermicompost, the native or naturalized Perionyx excavatus is recommended.

== Effects on soil ==
=== North America ===
European native lumbricid earthworms have been found to be some of the most successful invasive species in North America. Since their appearance around 400 years ago, these earthworms have positively impacted plant growth by altering the soil therefore affecting the community of plants in said soil.

== Control ==
There is no known way to remove the earthworms from the soil, so proposals have focused on ways to slow their spread. One simple measure is to reduce the number of worms released during fishing practices. The Minnesota Department of Natural Resources, in cooperation with local groups, has launched a public education campaign using posters in bait shops and other outreach efforts.

The movement of dirt from one location to the other could also be regulated so that dirt from areas where earthworms are common is not moved into forests without the invasive species. To prevent the spread of invasive earthworms, it is recommended that people should only purchase compost or mulch that has been heated to appropriate temperatures and duration to reduce pathogens and kill the earthworm cocoons, or eggs.

In areas that have already been colonized, the number of worms can be reduced by removal of introduced shrubs such as common buckthorn (Rhamnus cathartica) and honeysuckle (e.g., Lonicera × bella), which produce leaf litter favored by worms.

== See also ==
- Earthworms
- Invasive Earthworms of North America
- Lumbricids
- Vermiculture
