= List of earthworms of Canada =

There are thirty three species of earthworms found in Canada. Canada is the second-largest country on Earth, while earthworms are perhaps "the best known of all soil animals" and are ecologically important creatures. Of the earthworms known in Canada, 23 are introduced from Europe, 2 are introduced from east Asia, and the remaining 8 are native species.

== Species introduced to North America ==
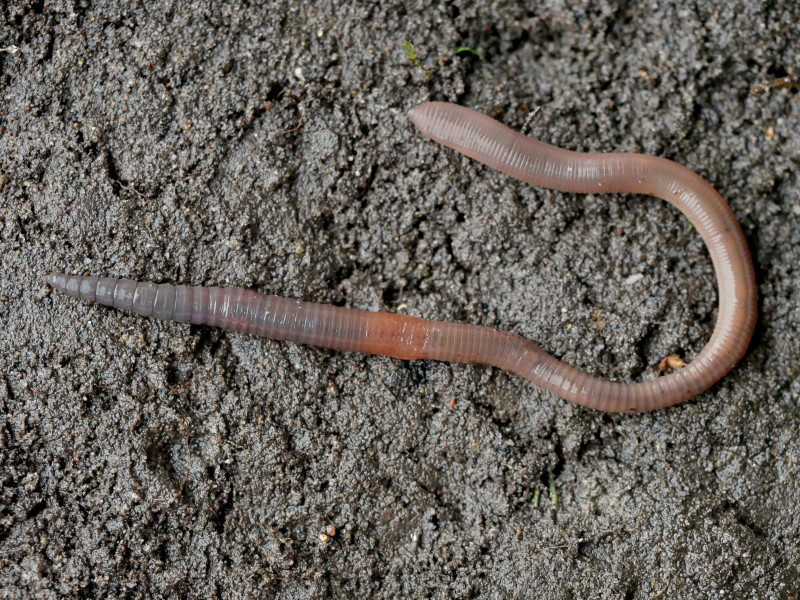
Aporrectodea longa in the Netherlands

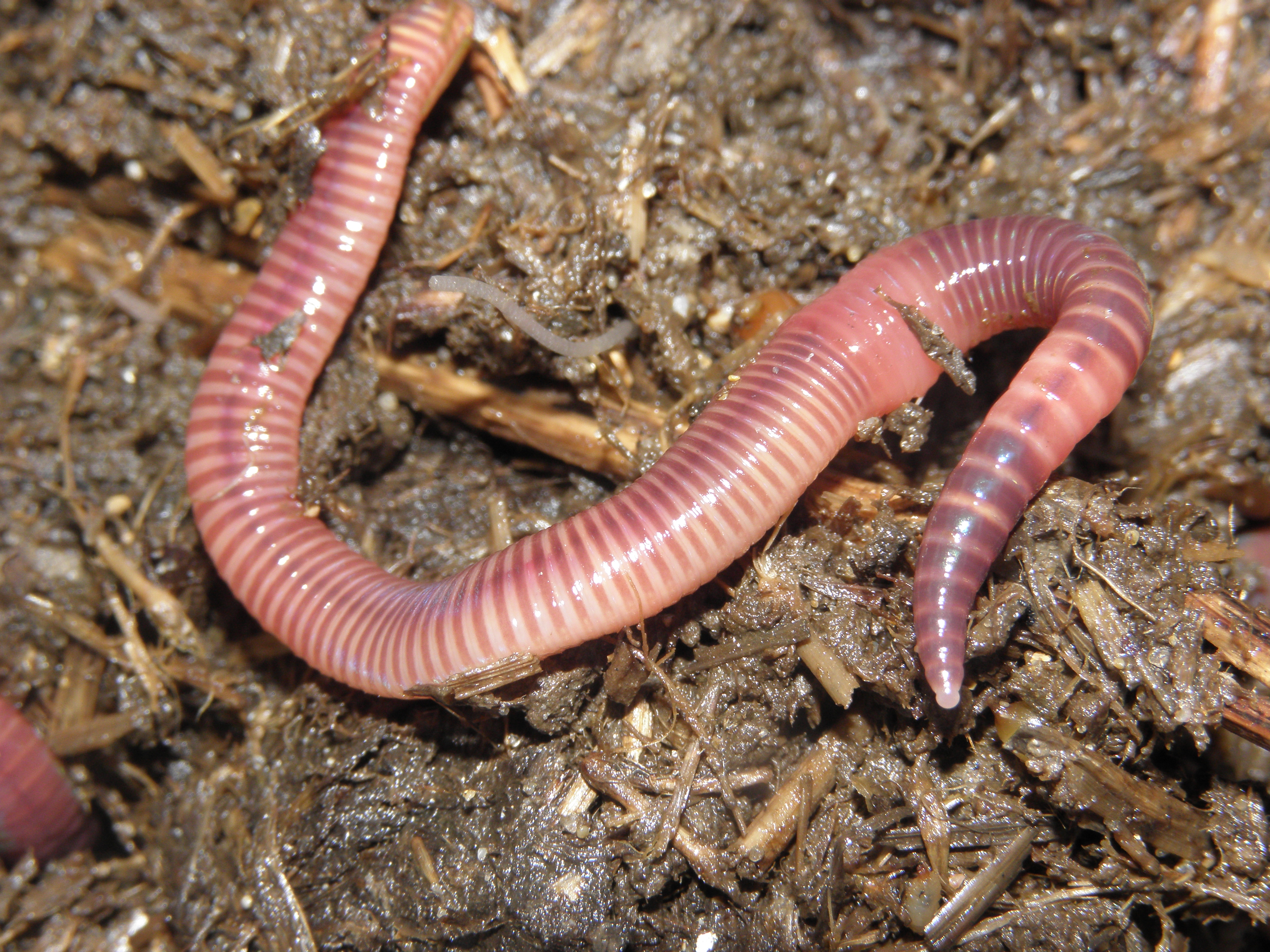
Eisenia fetida in the Netherlands

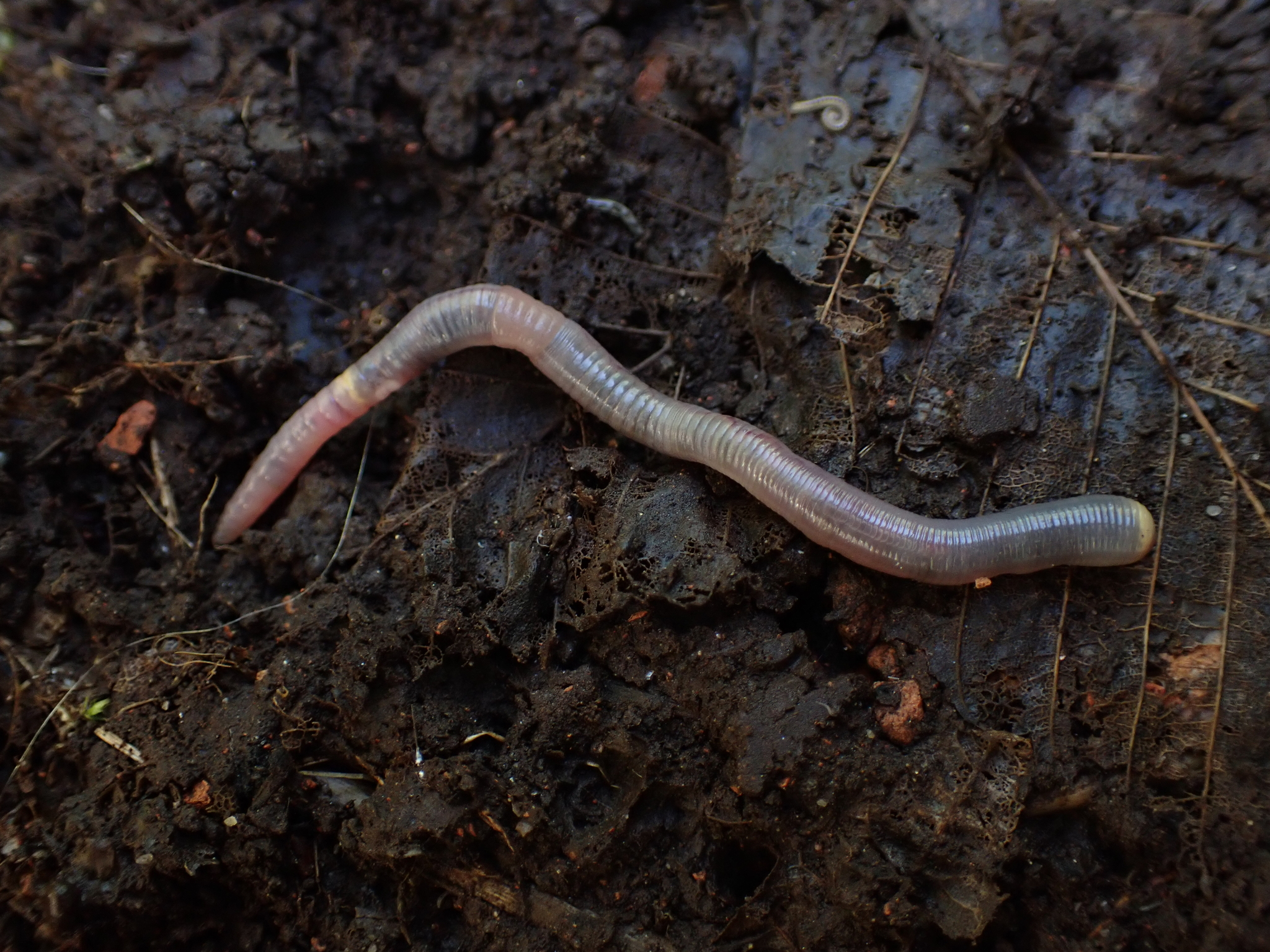
Octolasion cyaneum in Austria

=== Lumbricidae ===
Lumbricidae is a family possibly originating from the Palearctic realm, but in North America there are both native and introduced species.

- Allolobophora chlorotica
- Aporrectodea bowcrowensis (Note: "May be native" to North America)
- Aporrectodea icterica
- Aporrectodea limicola
- Aporrectodea longa
- Aporrectodea rosea
- Aporrectodea trapezoides
- Aporrectodea tuberculata
- Aporrectodea turgida
- Dendrobaena attemsi
- Dendrobaena hortensis
- Dendrobaena lusitana
- Dendrobaena octaedra
- Dendrodrilus rubidus
- Eisenia fetida
- Eisenia andrei
- Eiseniella tetraedra
- Lumbricus castaneus
- Lumbricus festivus
- Lumbricus rubellus
- Lumbricus terrestris
- Octolasion cyaneum
- Octolasion tyrtaeum
- Satchellius mammalis

=== Megascolecidae ===
- Amynthas agrestis
- Amynthas hilgendorfi
- Amynthas tokioensis
- Amynthas minimus
- Pithemera bicincta

== Species native to North America ==
=== Lumbricidae ===
- Bimastos beddardi
- Bimastos lawrenceae
- Bimastos parvus

=== Megascolecidae ===
- Arctiostrotus fontinalis
- Arctiostrotus perrieri
- Arctiostrotus vancouverensis
- Toutellus oregonensis

=== Sparganophilidae ===
- Sparganophilus tamesis
