= Metapheretima =

Scientific classification
- Kingdom: Animalia
- Phylum: Annelida
- Clade: Pleistoannelida
- Clade: Sedentaria
- Class: Clitellata
- Order: Opisthopora
- Suborder: Crassiclitellata
- Family: Megascolecidae
- Genus: Metapheretima; Michaelsen, 1928

Genus of earthworms

Metapheretima is a genus of annelid earthworms belonging to the family Megascolecidae, erected by Wilhelm Michaelsen in 1928. Species have been recorded mostly from Asia, Australia and Pacific Islands.

This genus is similar to Pheretima and other "Pheretimoid" genera (also including Amynthas, Archipheretima, Duplodicodrilus, Metaphire, Pithemera and Polypheretima). They form an important ecological and taxonomic group in the Oriental region.

== Species ==
The Global Biodiversity Information Facility lists:

1. Metapheretima agathis K.Lee, 1981
2. Metapheretima andurili Easton, 1979
3. Metapheretima apunae K.Lee, 1981
4. Metapheretima arensi Ude, 1932
5. Metapheretima buckerfieldi K.Lee, 1981
6. Metapheretima deidrae Easton, 1979
7. Metapheretima deirdrae Easton, 1979
8. Metapheretima doni Easton, 1979
9. Metapheretima dorii Easton, 1979
10. Metapheretima durendali Easton, 1979
11. Metapheretima elberti Ude, 1932
12. Metapheretima elrondi Easton, 1979
13. Metapheretima erromangae K.Lee, 1981
14. Metapheretima excalaberi Easton, 1979
15. Metapheretima glamdringi Easton, 1979
16. Metapheretima kellneri Ude, 1932
17. Metapheretima kilii Easton, 1979
18. Metapheretima lindiae Easton, 1979
19. Metapheretima noebiana Michaelsen, 1934
20. Metapheretima orcrista Easton, 1979
21. Metapheretima pallens Ude, 1924
22. Metapheretima quinqueremis Easton, 1979
23. Metapheretima septocta Easton, 1979
24. Metapheretima sergei Easton, 1984
25. Metapheretima simsi Easton, 1979
26. Metapheretima sola Easton, 1979
27. Metapheretima stingi Easton, 1979
28. Metapheretima sucklingensis Easton, 1979
29. Metapheretima swelaensis Ude, 1932
30. Metapheretima tavvarinensis (Cognetti, 1911)
31. Metapheretima tiencanhensis (Pham, 1995)
32. Metapheretima triciae Easton, 1979
33. Metapheretima vietnamensis (Thai, 1984)
34. Metapheretima wetzeli Ude, 1932
