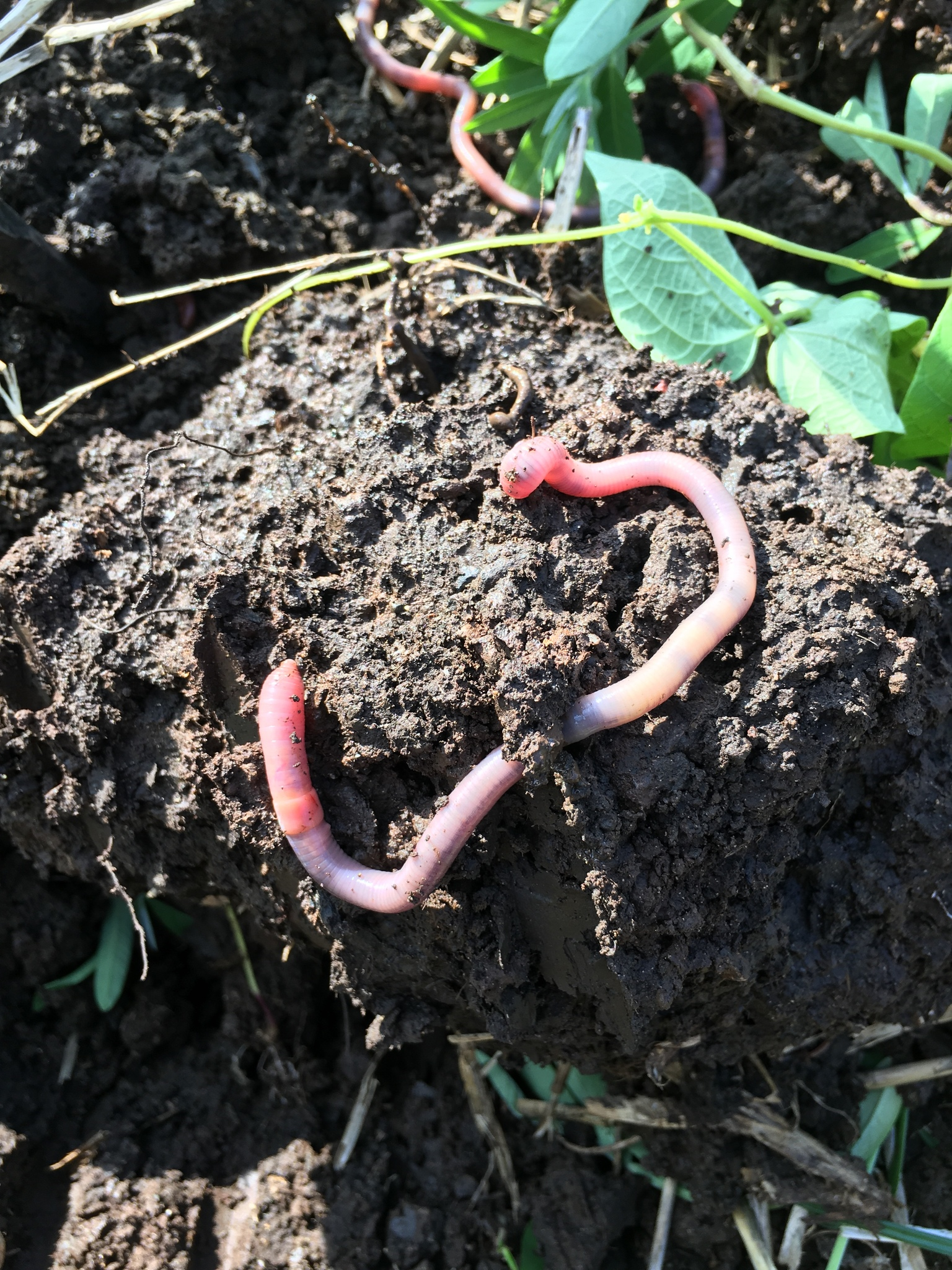
- Polypheretima elongata

Scientific classification
- Kingdom: Animalia
- Phylum: Annelida
- Clade: Pleistoannelida
- Clade: Sedentaria
- Class: Clitellata
- Order: Opisthopora
- Suborder: Crassiclitellata
- Family: Megascolecidae
- Genus: Polypheretima; Michaelsen, 1934

= Polypheretima =

Genus of earthworms

External image
- Images at iNaturalist

Polypheretima is a genus of annelid earthworms belonging to the family Megascolecidae, erected by Wilhelm Michaelsen in 1934. Species have been recorded mostly from Africa and Asia, with several apparently very locally endemic.

This genus is similar to Pheretima and other "Pheretimoid" genera (also including Amynthas, Archipheretima, Duplodicodrilus, Metaphire, Metapheretima and Pithemera). They form an important ecological and taxonomic group in the Oriental region.

== Species ==
The Global Biodiversity Information Facility lists:

1. Polypheretima agathis Lee, 1981
2. Polypheretima badia (Ude, 1932)
3. Polypheretima bannaworensis Y.Hong & James, 2008
4. Polypheretima bukidnonensis Aspe & James, 2016
5. Polypheretima cattienensis Nguyen, Tran & Nguyen, 2015
6. Polypheretima cokelat Fahri & Amaliah, 2017
7. Polypheretima coplandi Easton, 1979
8. Polypheretima cordata Nguyen, Tran & Nguyen, 2015
9. Polypheretima elongatoides Fahri & Nguyen, 2017
10. Polypheretima fruticosa Y.Hong & James, 2008
11. Polypheretima gatesi Easton, 1979
12. Polypheretima huonensis Easton, 1979
13. Polypheretima kalimpaaensis Fahri & Amaliah, 2017
14. Polypheretima kershawae Easton, 1979
15. Polypheretima koyana Michaelsen, 1934
16. Polypheretima lacertina Chen, 1946
17. Polypheretima lesonea Easton, 1979
18. Polypheretima medialis Lam, Nguyen & Nguyen, 2018
19. Polypheretima mekongmontis T.T.Nguyen, Tran & A.D.Nguyen, 2014
20. Polypheretima militium Nguyen, Tran & Nguyen, 2015
21. Polypheretima mindanaoensis Aspe & James, 2015
22. Polypheretima neglecta Easton, 1984
23. Polypheretima pagudpudensis Y.Hong & James, 2011
24. Polypheretima parataprobanea (Nguyen, 1993)
25. Polypheretima patae Easton, 1979
26. Polypheretima perlucidula Y.Hong & James, 2008
27. Polypheretima phacellotheca (Michaelsen, 1899)
28. Polypheretima sahlani Fahri & Amaliah, 2017
29. Polypheretima sempolensis Easton, 1979
30. Polypheretima tabhingensis Lam, Nguyen, Hoang, D. & Nguyen, 2018
31. Polypheretima tamarae Easton, 1984
32. Polypheretima tenebrica Chen, 1946
33. Polypheretima zamboangensis Aspe & James, 2016
