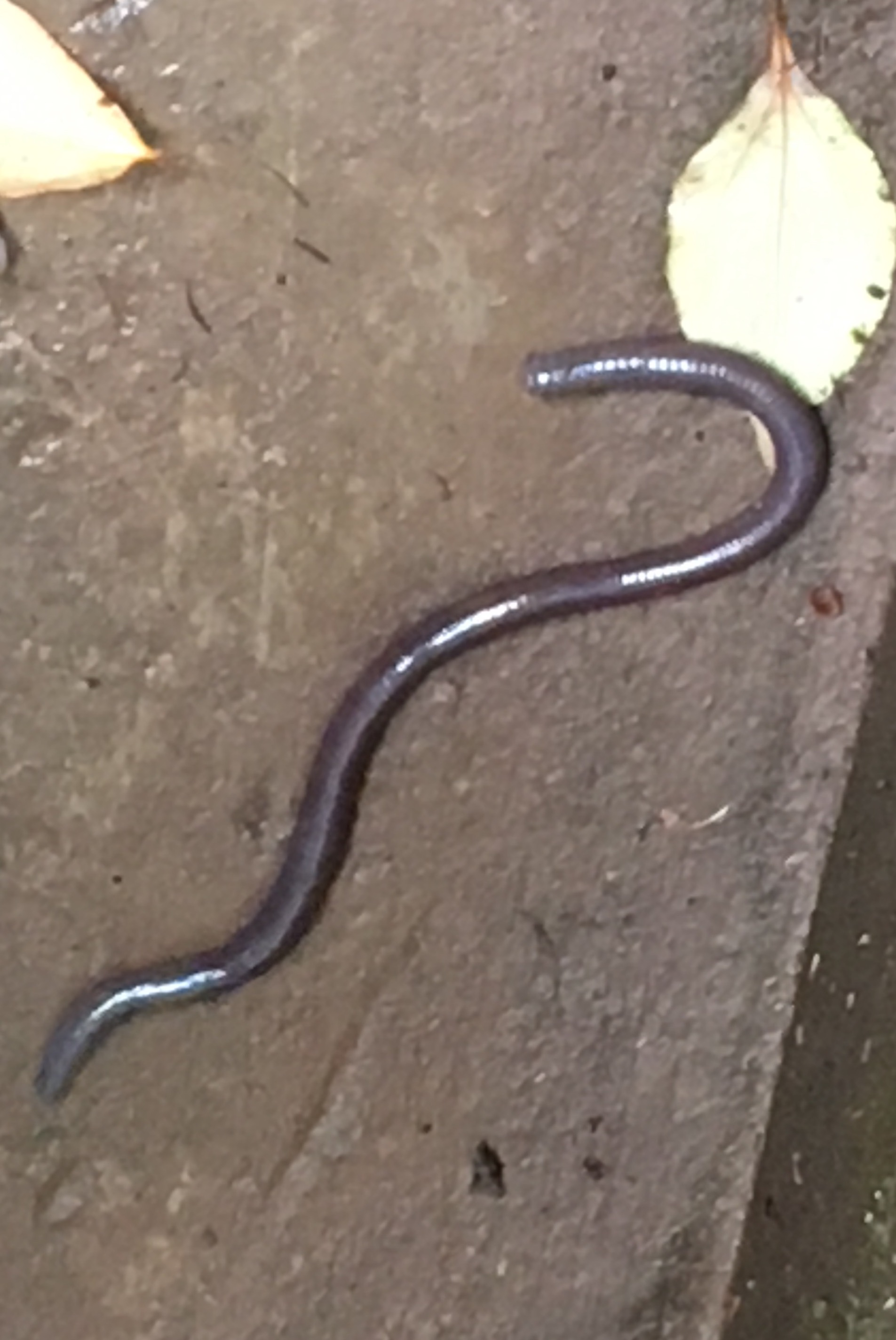
- Pheretima praepinguis

Scientific classification
- Kingdom: Animalia
- Phylum: Annelida
- Clade: Pleistoannelida
- Clade: Sedentaria
- Class: Clitellata
- Order: Opisthopora
- Family: Megascolecidae
- Genus: Pheretima; Kinberg, 1867

Species
- Many, see text

= Pheretima =

Genus of annelid worms

Pheretima is a genus of earthworms found mostly in New Guinea and parts of Southeast Asia.

Species belonging to the genus Pheretima have a clitellum, which is a band of glandular tissue present on segments 14 to 16.

Individuals are hermaphroditic and reproduction can be either sexual or parthenogenetic. Female genital pores lie on the ventral surface of segment 14. A pair of male genital pores is situated ventrally on segment 18. Genital papillae may also be present ventrally. As with all earthworms, development of young is without a larval stage and takes place in cocoons.

Pheretima are generally nocturnal, like most earthworms, and have an aversion to light. They come out only at night, and feed and reproduce only at night. Similar to most earthworms, they must keep their body surface wet to respire. They are also called farmer's friend as they help in making the soil porous for easy irrigation.

Similar genera include Amynthas, Archipheretima, Duplodicodrilus, Metaphire, Metapheretima, Pithemera, and Polypheretima. In combination these "pheretimoid" genera have about 1,000 species (mostly in this genus), making them an important ecological and taxonomic group of Oriental species (cf. Lumbricidae from Eurasia; Moniligastridae from Indo-Asian region).

Pheretima worms are administered as a medicine in China. The worm contains biological agents beneficial in rat models of stroke. In clinical practice, it has been recognized for its curative effects in the treatment of epilepsy. It contains hypoxanthine, lumbrofebrin, and lumbritin.

== Species ==
- Pheretima darnleiensis, Kinabalu giant earthworm
- Pheretima praepinguis
