= Metaphire hilgendorfi =

Conservation status
- Least Concern (IUCN 3.1)

Scientific classification
- Kingdom: Animalia
- Phylum: Annelida
- Clade: Pleistoannelida
- Clade: Sedentaria
- Class: Clitellata
- Order: Opisthopora
- Family: Megascolecidae
- Genus: Metaphire
- Species: M. hilgendorfi

Binomial name
- Metaphire hilgendorfi (Michaelsen, 1892)

Species of earthworm

Metaphire hilgendorfi is a species of earthworm. Native to East Asia, it is an introduced invasive species in North America.
