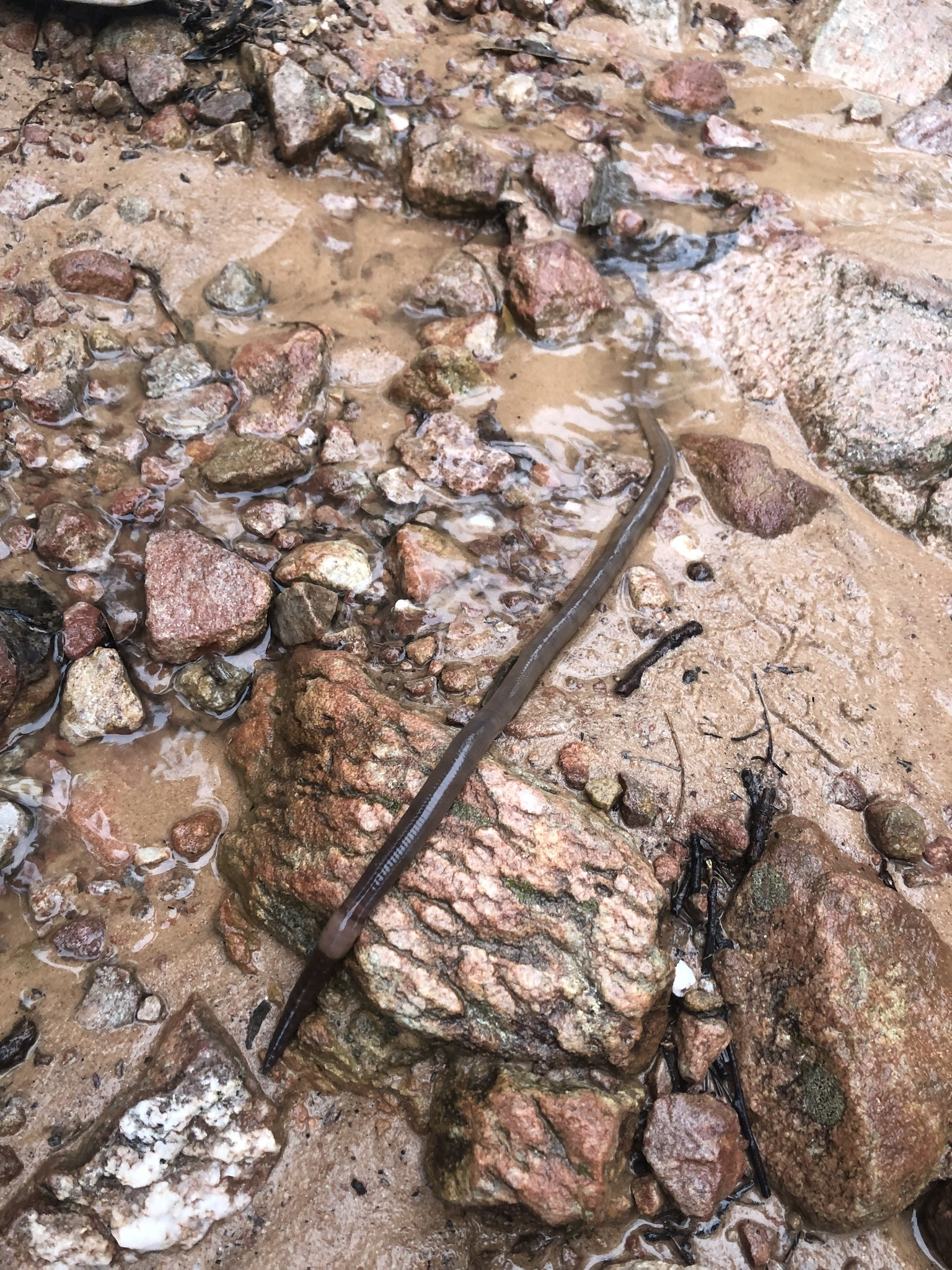
- Gemascolex stirlingi at the Black Hill Conservation Park

Scientific classification
- Domain: Eukaryota
- Kingdom: Animalia
- Phylum: Annelida
- Clade: Pleistoannelida
- Clade: Sedentaria
- Class: Clitellata
- Order: Opisthopora
- Family: Megascolecidae
- Genus: Gemascolex; Edmonds & Jamieson, 1973

Type species
- Gemascolex newmani Edmonds & Jamieson, 1973

Species
- 15, see text

= Gemascolex =

Genus of annelids

Gemascolex is a genus of annelid worms in the family Megascolecidae.

== Taxonomy and history ==
The genus Gemascolex and its type species Gemascolex newmani were described by Stanley Joe Edmonds and Barrie G. M. Jamieson in 1973. The genus appears to be closely related to Anisochaeta and Spenceriella.

== Distribution and habitat ==
Gemascolex species are distributed primarily in South Australia, but some are also known from New South Wales and Victoria.

== Species ==
Gemascolex contains the following species:

- Gemascolex bursatus Jamieson, 1974
- Gemascolex crateroides (Boardman, 1943)
- Gemascolex disparatus Dyne, 2000
- Gemascolex dorsalis (Fletcher, 1887)
- Gemascolex flindersi Dyne, 2000
- Gemascolex gelasinus Dyne, 2000
- Gemascolex gracilis (Fletcher, 1886)
- Gemascolex lateralis (Spencer, 1892)
- Gemascolex mirabilis Jamieson, 1974
- Gemascolex newmani Edmonds & Jamieson, 1973
- Gemascolex octothecatus Jamieson, 1974
- Gemascolex similis Jamieson, 1974
- Gemascolex stirlingi (Fletcher, 1887)
- Gemascolex terangiensis (Spencer, 1900)
- Gemascolex walkeri Jamieson, 1974
