= Amynthas japonicus =

Conservation status
- Data Deficient (IUCN 3.1)

Scientific classification
- Kingdom: Animalia
- Phylum: Annelida
- Clade: Pleistoannelida
- Clade: Sedentaria
- Class: Clitellata
- Order: Opisthopora
- Family: Megascolecidae
- Genus: Amynthas
- Species: †A. japonicus

Binomial name
- †Amynthas japonicus (Horst, 1883)

Synonyms
- Megascolex japonicus

Extinct species of annelid worm

Megascolecidae earthworm Amynthas japonicus is an extinct Japanese native probably collected from Nagasaki in the 1820s. It was one of three native earthworms featured in Dr P.F.B. von Siebold's extensive collection and recorded as one of Japan's earliest pheretimoid species. It is now deemed extinct given that a 2018 Nagasaki expedition and earlier 1930s reports failed to locate it. It is featured on The Recently Extinct Plants and Animals Database.
