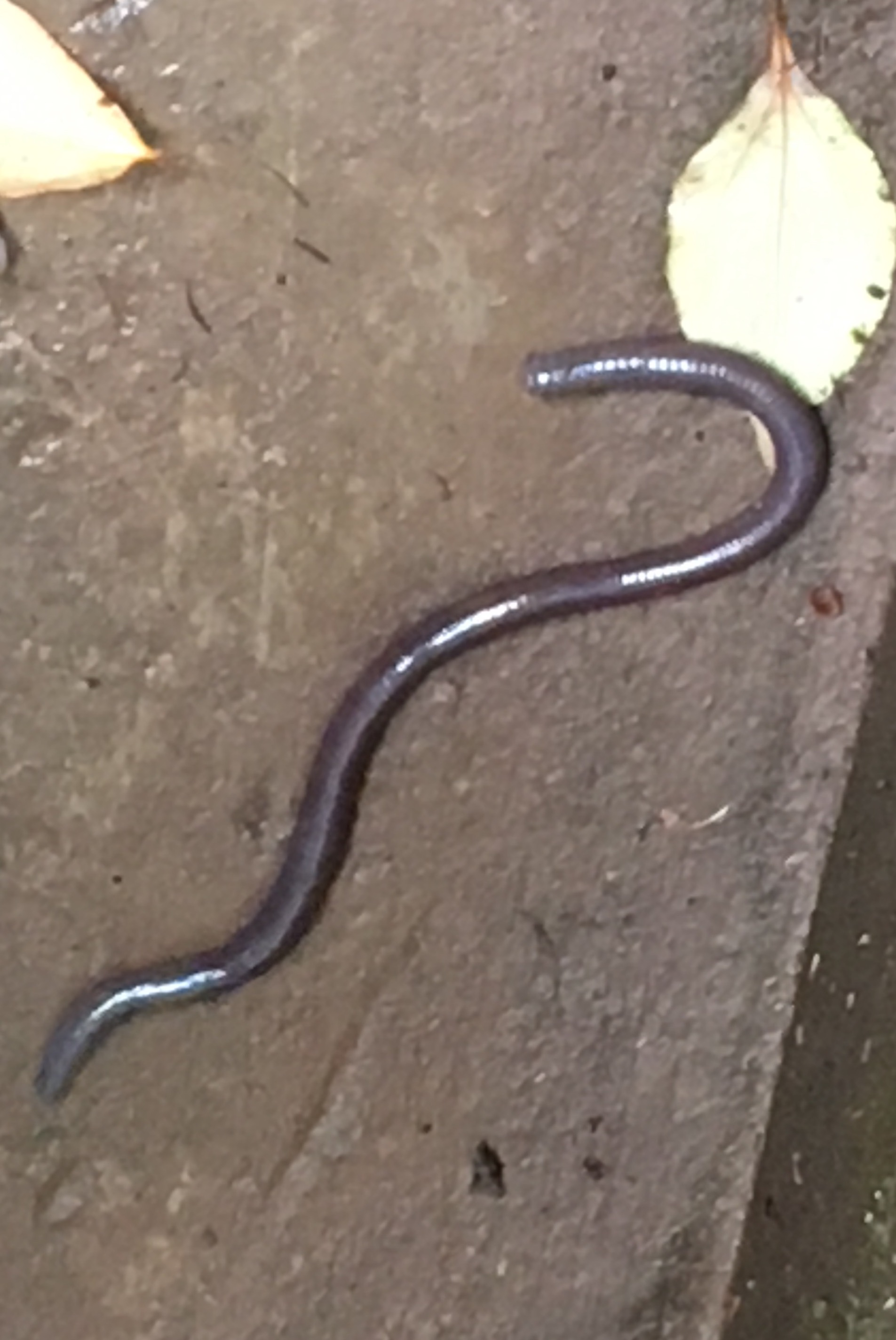

Scientific classification
- Domain: Eukaryota
- Kingdom: Animalia
- Phylum: Annelida
- Clade: Pleistoannelida
- Clade: Sedentaria
- Class: Clitellata
- Order: Opisthopora
- Family: Megascolecidae
- Genus: Pheretima
- Species: P. praepinguis

Binomial name
- Pheretima praepinguis Gates, 1935

= Pheretima praepinguis =

Species of annelid worm

Pheretima praepinguis is a huge earthworm about half meter long of genus Pheretima. Pheretima praepinguis lives in Emei mountain, Sichuan Province, China, and is one of the most featured organisms living in the place. It is trivially called "Big Earthworm of Emei"(Chinese: 峨嵋大蚯蚓) or "Toudilong" (Chinese: 透地龍, literally means "dragon which can go through the earth").

== History ==
In 1931, Yi Chen (Chinese: 陳義), an honored Chinese biologist, researched some samples of an earthworm from Mount Emei, Sichuan Province. At that time, he suggested that it should be classified as Pheretima tschiliensis. However, G. E. Gates found out that such earthworm is different with Pheretima tschiliensis. They can be distinguished by the location of the primary spermathecal pores in parietal invaginations. He then named this earthworm after Pheretima praepinguis in 1935. Although Yi Chen insisted that Pheretima praepinguis is a synonym of Pheretima tschiliensis in an article published in 1936, this name is ubiquitously accepted nowadays.

== See also ==
- Pheretima
- Pheretima tschiliensis
