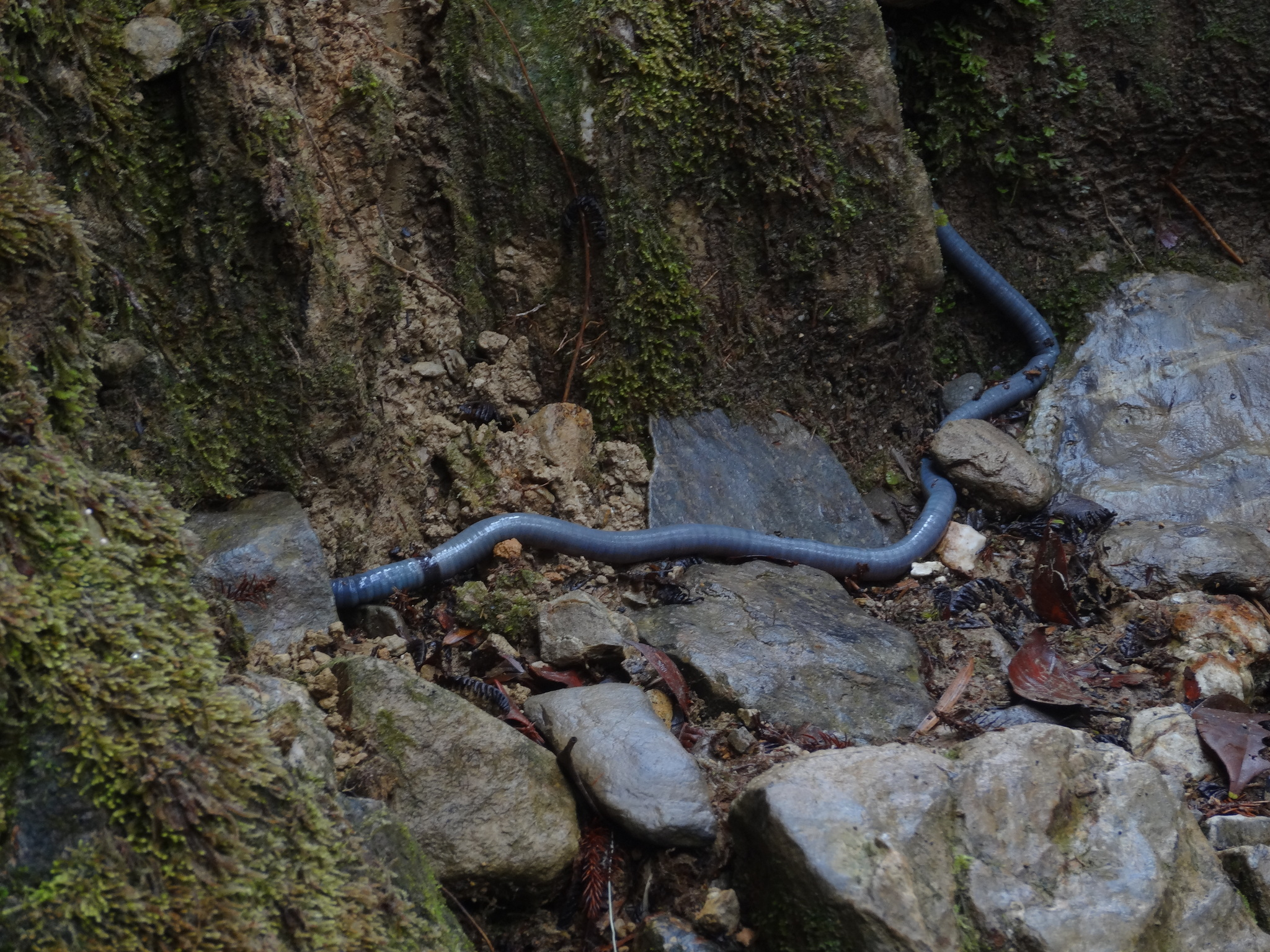

Scientific classification
- Domain: Eukaryota
- Kingdom: Animalia
- Phylum: Annelida
- Clade: Pleistoannelida
- Clade: Sedentaria
- Class: Clitellata
- Order: Opisthopora
- Family: Megascolecidae
- Genus: Pheretima
- Species: P. darnleiensis

Binomial name
- Pheretima darnleiensis (J. J. Fletcher, 1886)

= Kinabalu giant earthworm =

Species of annelid

The Kinabalu giant earthworm (Pheretima darnleiensis) is a grey-blue coloured peregrine annelid. It is found widely in Southeast Asia, primarily in the Indo-Australasian Archipelago (e.g., Singapore, Sumatra, Java, Bali, Borneo, Sulawesi, the Philippines, some islands near New Guinea such as Darnley Island and Christmas Island), but also in Peninsular Malaysia. Records from the Caroline Islands and Fiji are believed to represent introductions. This also applies to the eponymic Darnley Island record.

On Mount Kinabalu, Borneo, the animal grows to a length of approximately 70 cm and lives in burrows in the soft and thick soils around Paka Cave shelter, at an altitude of 3,000 m above sea level. The earthworm's segments are encircled by numerous setae and its skin has a greenish iridescent gloss. Amongst the Kinabalu earthworm's natural predators is another large annelid, the Kinabalu giant red leech. Both animals can only be seen during or after a heavy downpour.
