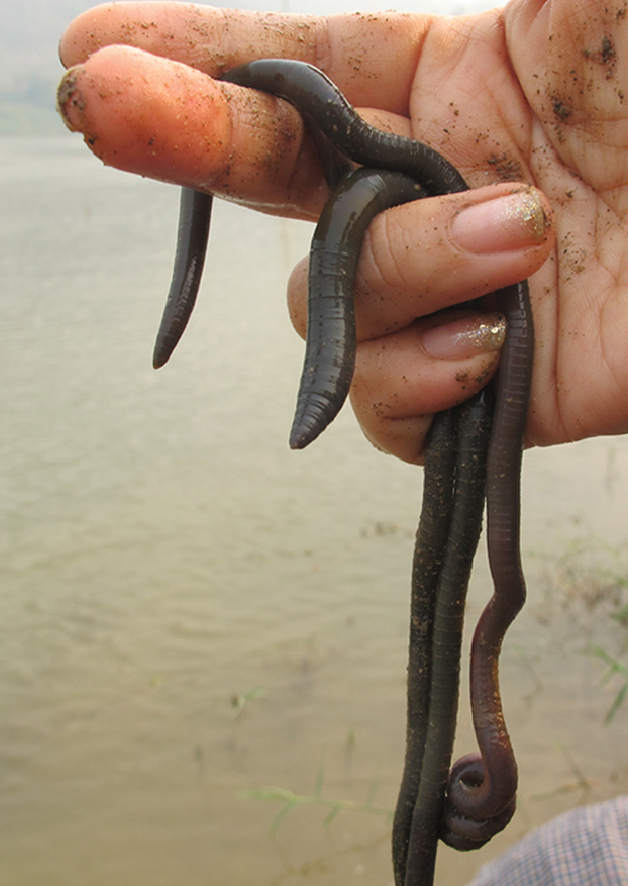

Scientific classification
- Kingdom: Animalia
- Phylum: Annelida
- Clade: Pleistoannelida
- Clade: Sedentaria
- Class: Clitellata
- Order: Opisthopora
- Family: Megascolecidae
- Genus: Amynthas
- Species: A. mekongianus

Binomial name
- Amynthas mekongianus (Cognetti, 1922)

Synonyms
- Megascolex mekongianus

= Amynthas mekongianus =

Species of annelid worm

Amynthas mekongianus, the Mekong worm or Mekong giant earthworm, previously known as Megascolex mekongianus, is a species of earthworm in the family Megascolecidae. A large species which reaches lengths of 2.9 m (10 ft), it is native to the Mekong river basin in southeastern Asia and may inhabit waterlogged soils and submerged habitats.

== Description ==
The Mekong giant earthworm may grow to a length of up to 2.9 m (10 ft). Compared to their great length, these worms are relatively slender. The type specimen was one metre long and 8 mm (0.3 in) wide at the broadest point (segment 5). It had 370 segments and was a greyish colour, rather paler on the ventral surface. The prostomium was poorly preserved. The second segment had 46 setae (bristles) in an incomplete ring with a gap on the ventral surface. Segments 3 to 25 bore about 100 setae each, arranged in a complete ring. The male pores were on segment 17, but this specimen was immature and lacked a clitellum. Other specimens may have more than 500 segments.

== Distribution and habitat ==
The type specimen was recorded as being from "Ban Leum on Mekong River, Annam". This was mistakenly believed to refer to a village in Central Vietnam well away from the River Mekong, but it has been found that "Ban leum" means "[I] forget the place" in the local dialect, and the type locality is thought to actually be in Thailand or Laos. The river forms a delta at that point and contains extensive mud- and sand flats with embankments where the worms live.

== Ecology ==
Unlike most other species of giant earthworm, which generally inhabit pastureland, the Mekong worm burrows into the Mekong's muddy banks. The worm forms complex networks of tunnels and brings large quantities of ingested soil to the surface in the form of worm castings. The worms may be collected from the mud, but are more easily collected from underwater at depths around 40 cm (16 in). Little is known of the worm's ecology.
