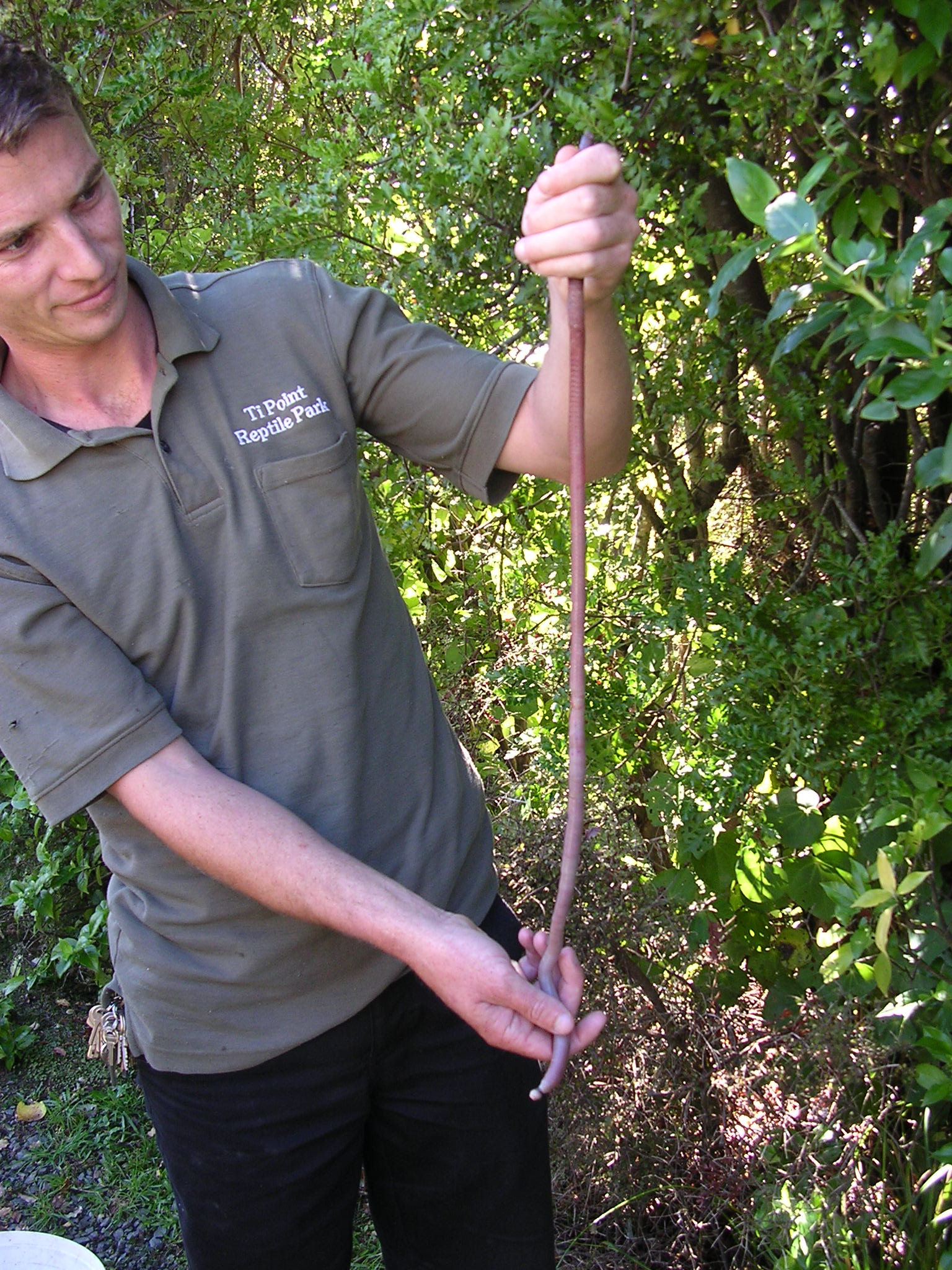

Scientific classification
- Kingdom: Animalia
- Phylum: Annelida
- Clade: Pleistoannelida
- Clade: Sedentaria
- Class: Clitellata
- Order: Opisthopora
- Family: Megascolecidae
- Genus: Anisochaeta
- Species: A. gigantea

Binomial name
- Anisochaeta gigantea (Benham, 1906)

Synonyms
- Diporochaeta gigantea; Anisochaeta gigantea; Celeriella gigantea; Spenceriella gigantea

= Anisochaeta gigantea =

Species of annelid worm

Anisochaeta gigantea (formerly Spenceriella gigantea or Celeriella gigantea), commonly called the North Auckland worm, is a rare giant annelid of the family Megascolecidae, endemic to New Zealand.

The North Auckland worm is New Zealand's largest, reaching 1.4 m (4 ft 7 in) long, and 11 mm (0.43 in) in diameter. Its burrows are up to 20 mm (0.79 in) in diameter, and reach a depth of 3.5 m (11 ft). It has been described as feeling "unshaven", likely due to the number of chaetae, about 60, on each segment. Dorsally, the worm is purplish‑red anterior to the clitellum, with a distinct purple streak running along the dorsal midline; the remainder of the body is a paler reddish colour. This colouration fades when preserved to white with purplish grey features.

Anisochaeta gigantea was described in 1905 and placed in the genus Diporochaeta by William Benham, a Professor at the University of Otago. The description was based upon a single specimen sent to him by Mr. R. Shakespear, the caretaker on Hauturu. The type locality is from a plateau 200 metres (660 ft) above sea level in forest subsoil on Little Barrier Island. Under both the New Zealand Threat Classification System and IUCN Redlist it is classed a "Data Deficient".

A. gigantea has been recorded throughout North Auckland, including offshore islands such as Little Barrier Island and the Hen and Chicken Islands, and extending as far north as Kaitaia..
