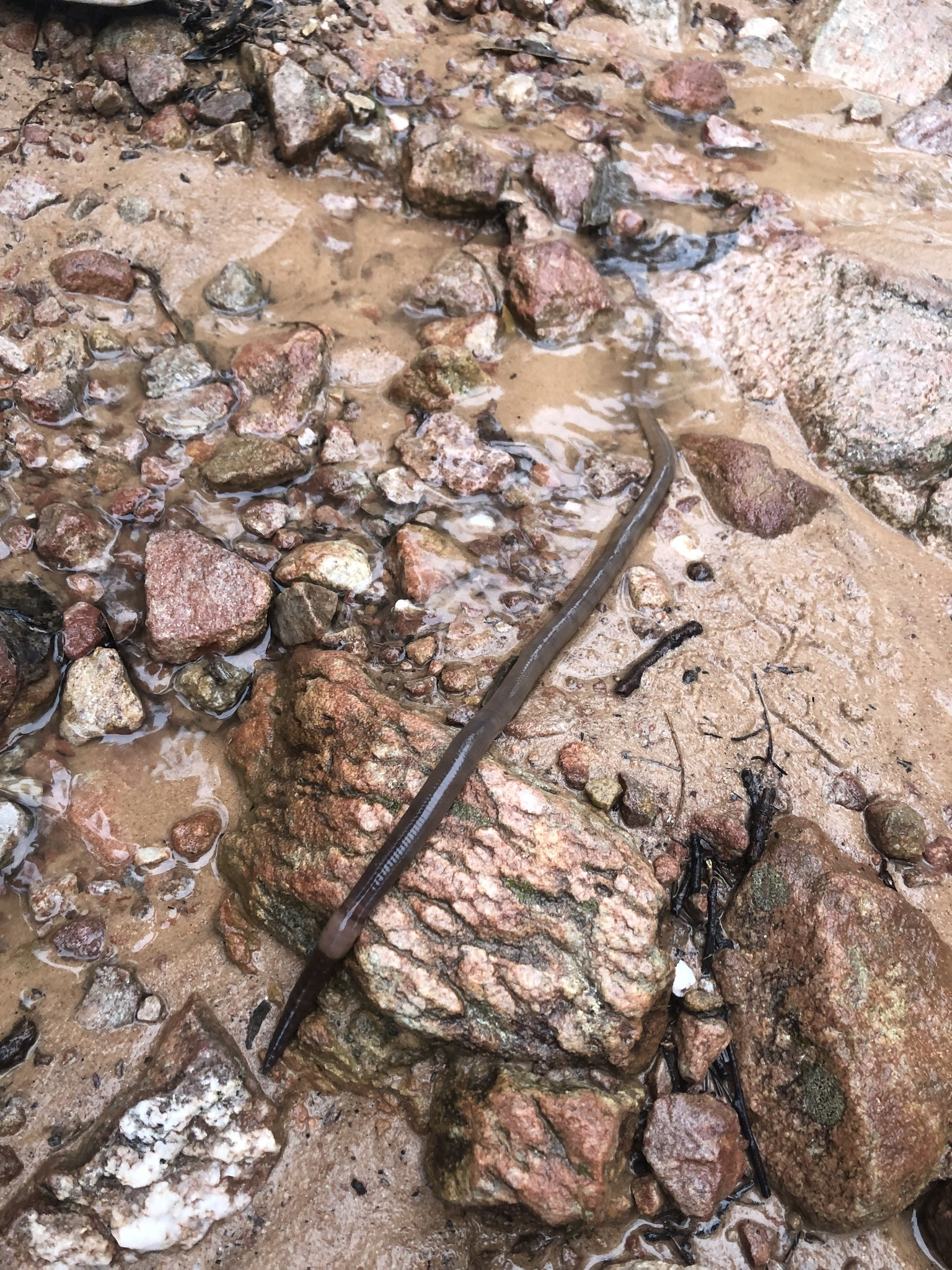

Scientific classification
- Kingdom: Animalia
- Phylum: Annelida
- Clade: Pleistoannelida
- Clade: Sedentaria
- Class: Clitellata
- Order: Opisthopora
- Family: Megascolecidae
- Genus: Gemascolex
- Species: G. stirlingi

Binomial name
- Gemascolex stirlingi (Fletcher, 1877)

Synonyms
- Perichaeta stirlingi Fletcher, 1887; Megascolex fletcheri Shannon, 1920

= Gemascolex stirlingi =

Species of annelid

Gemascolex stirlingi, commonly known as the giant Mount Lofty earthworm, is a species of annelid native to the state of South Australia. It was identified in 1887, and is found throughout the Mount Lofty ranges and Adelaide Hills areas.

In July 2026, after a particularly wet winter across the state, it was reported that there had been numerous sightings of very large earthworms across the state, measuring 70 cm to 2 metres. One scientist has hypothesised that that there could be a new species that lives in the drier parts of South Australia, but there were not as yet any published studies about it.
