= Pithemera bicincta =

Scientific classification
- Kingdom: Animalia
- Phylum: Annelida
- Clade: Pleistoannelida
- Clade: Sedentaria
- Class: Clitellata
- Order: Opisthopora
- Family: Megascolecidae
- Genus: Pithemera
- Species: P. bicincta

Binomial name
- Pithemera bicincta (Perrier, 1875)

Species of earthworm

Pithemera bicincta is a species of earthworm in the family Megascolecidae.

It is an introduced invasive species in North America.
