= Rhodopis (disambiguation) =

Rhodopis can refer to:

- Rhodopis, an ancient Greek courtesan first mentioned by Herodotus
- Rhodopis and Euthynicus, pair of mythical hunters devoted to Artemis
- Rhodopis, a genus of birds with the oasis hummingbird (Rhodopis vesper) as its only living member
- Rhodopis (plant), genus of legumes
- Rhodopis, a disused taxonomic synonym for a genus of worms, Metaphire

See also

- The Rhodopes or Rhodope Mountains, mountains in south-eastern Europe in the area of ancient Thrace, now on the border of Greece and Bulgaria
