= Pontodrilus =

Scientific classification
- Kingdom: Animalia
- Phylum: Annelida
- Clade: Pleistoannelida
- Clade: Sedentaria
- Class: Clitellata
- Order: Opisthopora
- Family: Megascolecidae
- Genus: Pontodrilus; Perrier, 1874

Genus of annelid worms

Pontodrilus is a genus of annelids belonging to the family Megascolecidae.

Species:

- Pontodrilus bermudensis Beddard, 1891
- Pontodrilus ephippiger Rosa, 1898
- Pontodrilus lacustris (Benham, 1903)
- Pontodrilus litoralis (Grube, 1855)
- Pontodrilus primoris Blakemore, 2000
