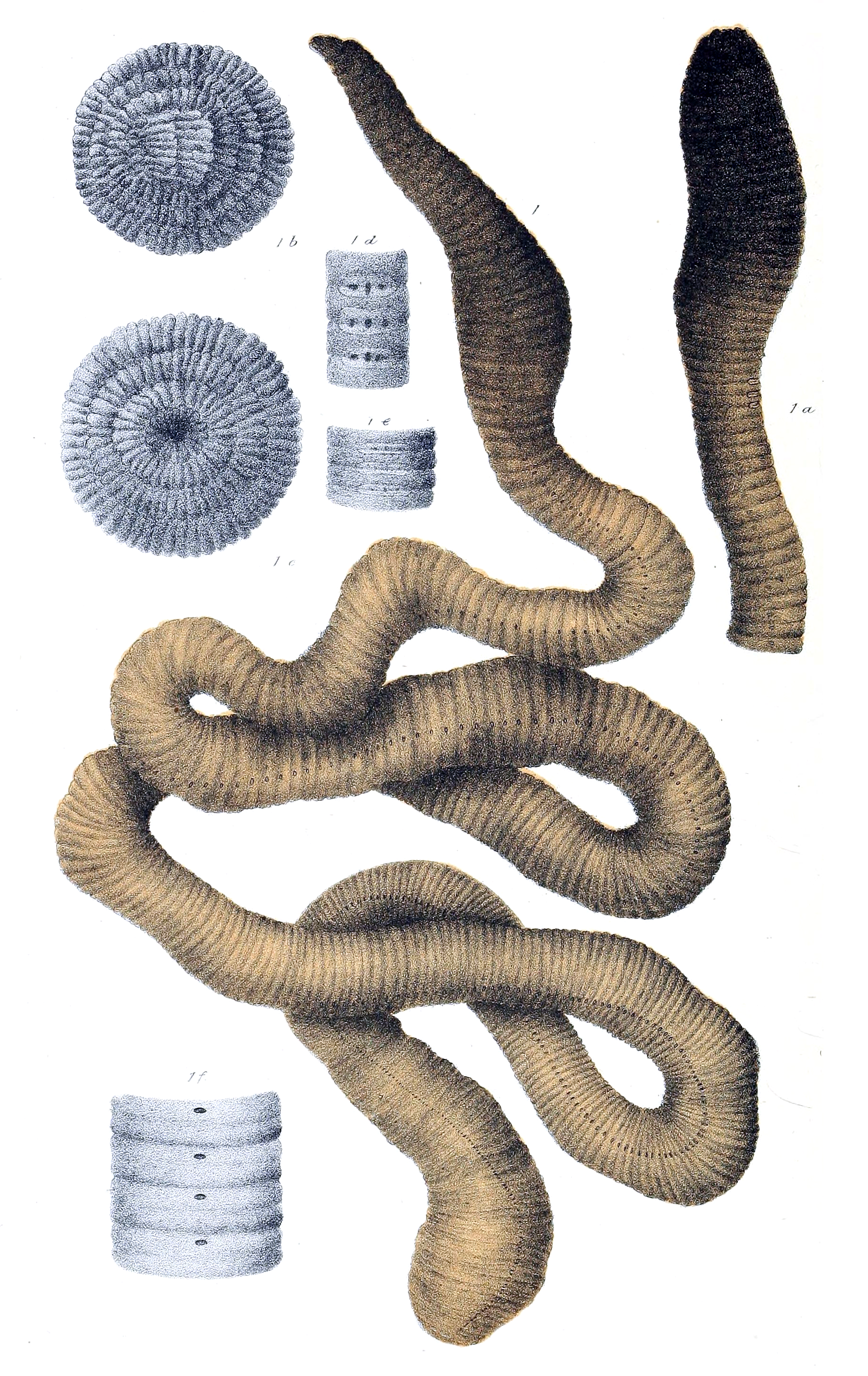
- Megascolides australis

Scientific classification
- Kingdom: Animalia
- Phylum: Annelida
- Clade: Pleistoannelida
- Clade: Sedentaria
- Class: Clitellata
- Order: Opisthopora
- Family: Megascolecidae
- Genus: Megascolides; McCoy, 1878

Species
- About 40, see species

= Megascolides =

Genus of annelids

Megascolides is a genus of earthworms in the family Megascolecidae.

== Species ==
There are about 40 species:

- Megascolides albus Lee, 1952
- Megascolides attenuatus Spencer, 1892
- Megascolides australis McCoy, 1878 – giant Gippsland earthworm
- Megascolides cataractus Blakemore, 2000
- Megascolides catenastagnis Blakemore, 2000
- Megascolides croesus Blakemore, 2000
- Megascolides diaphanus Spencer, 1900
- Megascolides eucalypti Spencer, 1900
- Megascolides fontis Blakemore, 2000
- Megascolides fuscus Lee, 1952
- Megascolides improbus Blakemore, 2000
- Megascolides intestinalis Blakemore, 2000
- Megascolides irregularis Lee, 1952
- Megascolides jotaylorae Blakemore, 2000
- Megascolides laffani Blakemore, 2000
- Megascolides manni
- Megascolides multituberculata Jamieson, 1972
- Megascolides neglectus Cognetti de Martiis, 1909
- Megascolides oppidanus Blakemore, 2000
- Megascolides parvus Lee, 1952
- Megascolides punctatus Spencer, 1900
- Megascolides raglani Lee, 1952
- Megascolides reptans (Ude, 1905)
- Megascolides ruber Lee, 1952
- Megascolides rubicundus Lee, 1959
- Megascolides salmo Blakemore, 2000
- Megascolides sanctorum Blakemore, 2000
- Megascolides simsoni Keable, 1895
- Megascolides sinuosus Spencer, 1892
- Megascolides steeli Spencer, 1900
- Megascolides tasmani Lee, 1959
- Megascolides tener Blakemore, 2000
- Megascolides tisdalli Spencer, 1900
- Megascolides tortuosus Blakemore, 2000
- Megascolides umbonis Blakemore, 2000
- Megascolides unipapillatus (Ude, 1905)
- Megascolides victoriensis Spencer, 1892
- Megascolides viridis Lee, 1952
- Megascolides volvens Spencer, 1900
- Megascolides xanthus Blakemore, 2000
