= Spenceriella =

Scientific classification
- Kingdom: Animalia
- Phylum: Annelida
- Clade: Pleistoannelida
- Clade: Sedentaria
- Class: Clitellata
- Order: Opisthopora
- Family: Megascolecidae
- Genus: Spenceriella; Michaelsen, 1907

Type species
- Diporochaeta notabilis Spencer, 1900

Species
- See text

Genus of annelids

Spenceriella is a genus of worms in the family Megascolecidae that is now included in the prior genus Anisochaeta although some other species are transferred to Celeriella.

== Species ==
- Spenceriella aemula (Blakemore, 2000)
- Spenceriella ancisa (Blakemore, 2000)
- Spenceriella andersoni (Spencer, 1900)
- Spenceriella angusticlavia (Blakemore, 2000)
- Spenceriella aterpaenulata (Blakemore, 2000)
- Spenceriella australis (Fletcher, 1886)
- Spenceriella austrina (Fletcher, 1886)
- Spenceriella bennetti Dyne, 2000
- Spenceriella buckerfieldi (Blakemore, 1997)
- Spenceriella bulla (Blakemore, 2000)
- Spenceriella bywongensis Jamieson, 2001
- Spenceriella calamonis Dyne, 2000
- Spenceriella calpetana (Blakemore, 2000)
- Spenceriella calvasaxea (Blakemore, 2000)
- Spenceriella campestris Dyne, 2000
- Spenceriella celmisiae (Jamieson, 1973)
- Spenceriella conondalei Jamieson, 1995
- Spenceriella conspecta (Blakemore, 2000)
- Spenceriella cormieri Jamieson & Wampler, 1979
- Spenceriella crateris Dyne, 2000
- Spenceriella curtisi Jamieson & Wampler, 1979
- Spenceriella difficilis Jamieson, 1977
- Spenceriella erica (Blakemore, 2000)
- Spenceriella exigua (Fletcher, 1887)
- Spenceriella fardyi (Spencer, 1900)
- Spenceriella fecunda (Fletcher, 1887)
- Spenceriella flava (Blakemore, 2000)
- Spenceriella garilarsoni (Blakemore, 2000)
- Spenceriella hallii (Spencer, 1892)
- Spenceriella hamiltoni (Fletcher, 1887)
- Spenceriella hoggi (Spencer, 1892)
- Spenceriella hoggii Spencer, 1892
- Spenceriella hollowayi Jamieson, 1977
- Spenceriella howeana Jamieson, 1977
- Spenceriella ima (Blakemore, 2000)
- Spenceriella imparicystis Jamieson, 1974
- Spenceriella indissimilis (Fletcher, 1889)
- Spenceriella inermis (Stephenson, 1933)
- Spenceriella jenolanensis (Boardman, 1943)
- Spenceriella larpentensis (Spencer, 1900)
- Spenceriella lata (Blakemore, 2000)
- Spenceriella lavatiolacuna (Blakemore, 2000)
- Spenceriella liberalis (Blakemore, 2000)
- Spenceriella longiductis (Blakemore, 1997)
- Spenceriella macleayi (Fletcher, 1889)
- Spenceriella macquariensis (Fletcher, 1890)
- Spenceriella manningi Jamieson, 2001
- Spenceriella megagaster (Blakemore, 1997)
- Spenceriella minor (Spencer, 1900)
- Spenceriella mjoebergi (Michaelsen, 1916)
- Spenceriella montanus (Spencer, 1900)
- Spenceriella monticola (Fletcher, 1887)
- Spenceriella murrayana (Fletcher, 1887)
- Spenceriella nevillensis Jamieson, 2001
- Spenceriella noctiluca Jamieson & Wampler, 1979
- Spenceriella notabilis (Spencer, 1900)
- Spenceriella novaeanglica (Blakemore, 2000)
- Spenceriella novocombei (Blakemore, 1997)
- Spenceriella palustris (Blakemore, 2000)
- Spenceriella paucula (Blakemore, 2000)
- Spenceriella penolaensis Jamieson, 1974
- Spenceriella pilularis Dyne, 2000
- Spenceriella pusilla Dyne, 2000
- Spenceriella rava (Blakemore, 2000)
- Spenceriella raymondiana (Fletcher, 1887)
- Spenceriella rodwayi (Stephenson, 1931)
- Spenceriella rubeospina (Blakemore, 2000)
- Spenceriella rubra (Spencer, 1892)
- Spenceriella saundersi Jamieson, 1977
- Spenceriella sebastiani (Blakemore, 1997)
- Spenceriella steelii (Spencer, 1892)
- Spenceriella sylvatica (Spencer, 1892)
- Spenceriella tenax (Fletcher, 1886)
- Spenceriella thannae Dyne, 2000
- Spenceriella toonumbari (Blakemore, 2000)
- Spenceriella tunicata (Blakemore, 2000)
- Spenceriella variabilis Dyne, 2000
- Spenceriella virgata (Blakemore, 2000)
- Spenceriella virgultis Dyne, 2000
- Spenceriella wiburdi (Boardman, 1943)
- Spenceriella wilsoniana (Fletcher, 1887)
- Spenceriella xylicola Dyne, 2000
- Spenceriella yabbratigris (Blakemore, 2000)
