= Amynthas minimus =

Scientific classification
- Kingdom: Animalia
- Phylum: Annelida
- Clade: Pleistoannelida
- Clade: Sedentaria
- Class: Clitellata
- Order: Opisthopora
- Family: Megascolecidae
- Genus: Amynthas
- Species: A. minimus

Binomial name
- Amynthas minimus (Horst, 1893)

Species of earthworm

Amynthas minimus is a species of earthworm in the family Megascolecidae.

It is an introduced invasive species in North America.
