= Aridulodrilus =

Scientific classification
- Domain: Eukaryota
- Kingdom: Animalia
- Phylum: Annelida
- Clade: Pleistoannelida
- Clade: Sedentaria
- Class: Clitellata
- Order: Opisthopora
- Family: Megascolecidae
- Genus: Aridulodrilus
- Species: A. molesworthae

Binomial name
- Aridulodrilus molesworthae Dyne, 2021

Genus of earthworm

Holotype site: Willa Willyong Creek, Rupee Station, 10 km NE from Broken Hill, Western New South Wales'"`UNIQ--ref-00000005-QINU`"'

Aridulodrilus molesworthae is a large Australian earthworm occurring, unusually, in a semiarid region of New South Wales. It was recognised as a species of Megascolecidae, a family with extreme diversity in the wetter coastal regions of the continent, but distinguished as a new monotypic genus Aridulodrilus, a name derived from Latin meaning a semi-desert worm. This animal was first recorded by a Broken Hill property's manager, Rosalind Molesworth, after substantial rain had brought them to the surface; the specific epithet molesworthae honours its discoverer.

As a species greater than 250 mm in length, it is considered to be a large earthworm, specimens may be up to 1.5 metres when extended.

Aridulodrilus molesworthae is known at locations with low annual rainfall, an average of 260 mm, whereas most megascolecid species occur in areas receiving at least 400 mm rainfall isohyet. Their diet of microscopic organisms within the soil, rather than vegetive matter near the surface, may allow the species to subsist in a more arid environment. They are unknown outside its type locality, an area of ten hectares, in the IBRA Broken Hill Complex region.
