= Perionyx =

Scientific classification
- Kingdom: Animalia
- Phylum: Annelida
- Clade: Pleistoannelida
- Clade: Sedentaria
- Class: Clitellata
- Order: Opisthopora
- Family: Megascolecidae
- Genus: Perionyx; Perrier, 1872

Genus of annelid worms

Perionyx is a genus of annelids belonging to the family Megascolecidae.

The genus has almost cosmopolitan distribution.

Species:

- Perionyx aborensis Stephenson, 1914
- Perionyx alatus Stephenson, 1920
- Perionyx annandalei Michaelsen, 1907
- Perionyx excavatus
