= Amynthas tokioensis =

Conservation status
- Least Concern (IUCN 3.1)

Scientific classification
- Kingdom: Animalia
- Phylum: Annelida
- Clade: Pleistoannelida
- Clade: Sedentaria
- Class: Clitellata
- Order: Opisthopora
- Family: Megascolecidae
- Genus: Amynthas
- Species: A. tokioensis

Binomial name
- Amynthas tokioensis (Beddard, 1892)

Synonyms
- Amynthas boletiformis Hong & James, 2001; Amynthas eastoni Hong & James, 2001; Amynthas paiki Hong, 2001; Amynthas sonjaesiki Hong & James, 2009; Amynthas yongshilensis Hong & James, 2001; Perichaeta irregularis Goto & Hatai, 1899; Perichaeta levis Goto & Hatai, 1899; Perichaeta tokioensis Beddard, 1892; Pheretima parvicystis Goto & Hatai, 1899; Pheretima schizopora Goto & Hatai, 1898

Species of earthworm

Amynthas tokioensis, the Asian jumping worm, is a species of earthworm in the family Megascolecidae. It is native to Japan and the Korean Peninsula. It is an invasive species in North America.

These worms engage in parthenogenetic reproduction.

== Taxonomy ==
This worm was first described by Frank Evers Beddard in 1892 as Perichaeta tokioensis.

== Conservation status ==
The IUCN declared it as of Least Concern in 2018.
