= Invasive earthworms of North America =

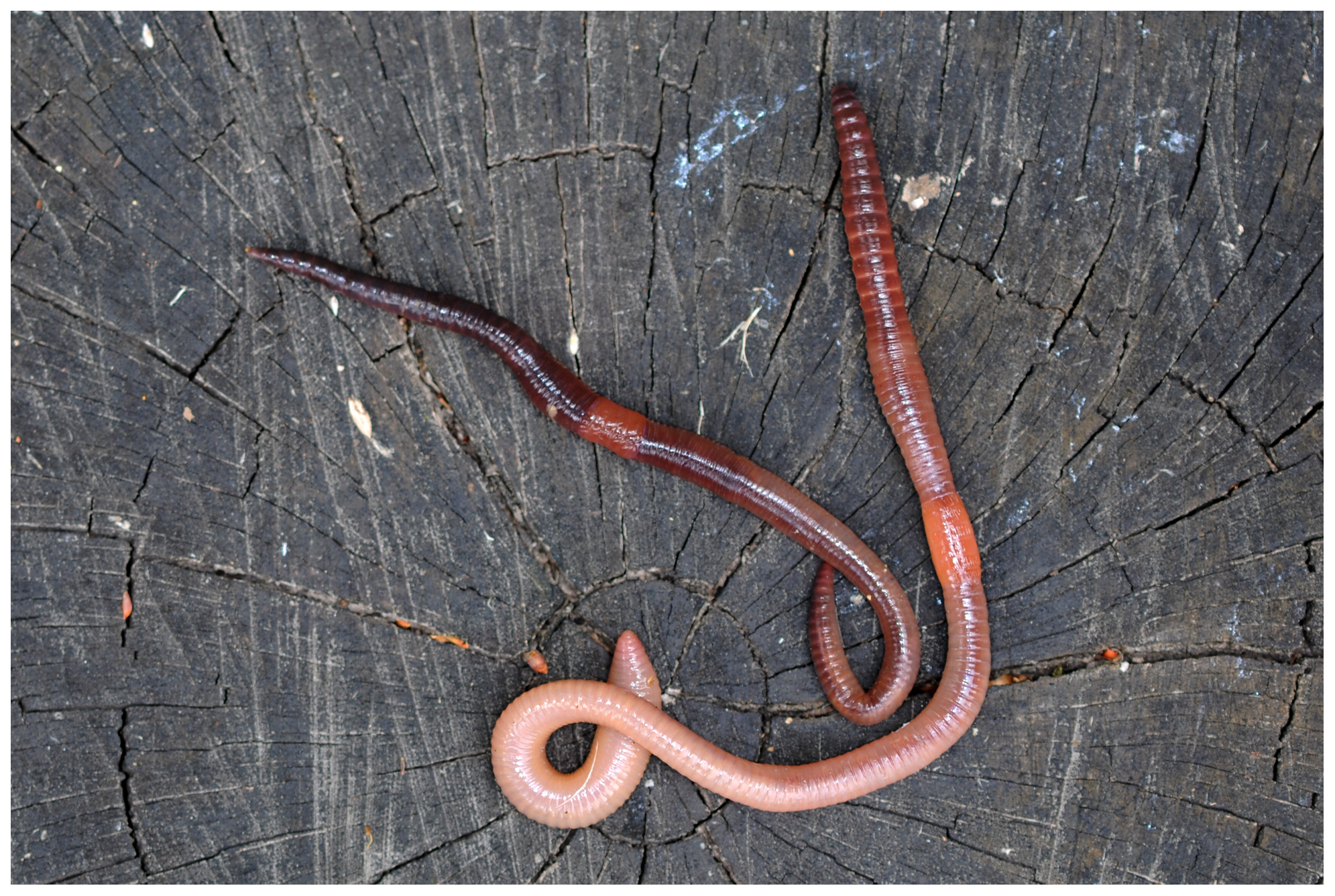
Lumbricus herculeus and Lumbricus terrestris, widely spread invasive earthworms native to Europe.

Invasive species of earthworms from the suborder Lumbricina have been expanding their range in North America. Earthworms are considered one of the most abundant macroinvertebrates in the soil of ecosystems in temperate and tropical climates. There are around 3,000 species known worldwide. They are considered keystone species in their native habitats of Asia and Europe because, as detritivores, they alter many different variables of their ecosystem. Their introduction to North America has had marked effects on the nutrient cycles and soil profiles in temperate forests. These earthworms increase the cycling and leaching of nutrients by breaking up decaying organic matter and spreading it into the soil. This thins out the soil rapidly because earthworms population can grow quickly since most earthworms have large broods, short time to sexual maturity, resilient cocoons, are hermaphrodites (easier to find a mate) and a few such as Amynthas do not need mates through asexual reproduction called parthenogenesis. Since plants native to these northern forests are evolutionarily adapted to the presence of thick layers of decaying organic matter, the introduction of worms can lead to a loss of biodiversity as young plants face less nutrient-rich conditions. Some species of trees and other plants may be incapable of surviving such changes in available nutrients. This change in the plant diversity in turn affects other organisms and often leads to increased invasions of other exotic species as well as overall forest decline. They are considered one of the most invasive animals in the Midwestern United States along with feral swine.

== Earthworms and range shifts ==
Earthworms are shifting their ranges northwards into forests between 45° and 69° latitude in North America that have lacked native earthworms since the last ice age. Of the 182 taxa of earthworms found in the United States and Canada, 60 (33%) are introduced species, these earthworm species are primarily from Europe and Asia. Among these, Lumbricus terrestris, L. rubellus, L. friendi, Amynthas agrestis, and Dendrobaena octaedra have been studied for their ability to invade previously uninhabited locations and disturb the local ecosystems and nutrient cycles. By redistributing nutrients, mixing soil layers, and creating pores in the soil, they can affect the characteristics of the soil important to the rest of the ecosystem. Earthworms break up decomposing matter on the surface of the soil and carry or mix it into the surrounding soil, often carrying some of the nutrients deeper into the soil, where saplings and other young plants have trouble reaching them.

== Influence on nutrient cycles and soil profiles ==
When organisms die and plants undergo senescence, their detritus fall to the forest floor, where they begin decomposing into their constituent nutrients. In the absence of efficient detritivores such as earthworms, a thick layer of such organic matter accumulates. Most northern forests in North America lack native earthworms, which were largely wiped out when the ice sheets of the Wisconsin glaciation scoured much of the continent down to the bedrock. A deep detritus layer is thus characteristic of the native ecosystem of the region, and many native plants have evolved to rely on it. As it slowly decomposes, it supplies nutrients, particularly potassium, phosphorus, and nitrogen, that are necessary for the production of cellular components such as carbohydrates, nucleic acids, and proteins; these nutrients are often a limiting factor in growth and maturation. This provides for the growth of trees, ferns, and smaller ground plants.

When earthworms are introduced into areas where they previously did not reside, the earthworms break up the organic layer. They do this physically by burrowing, consuming and redistributing leaf litter, and leaving behind castings in the soil. They often mix the nutrients into the soil, out of the reach of all but the deeper tree roots. Nutrients may then be leached and lost from the ecosystem entirely. Overall effects include a decrease in the thickness of the organic layer, increased mineralization, increased bulk density, spreading of the organic matter and humus, and increased rate of decomposition. These environmental alterations (drier, brighter, less nutrient-rich soil) create changes to the ecosystem. Podzol soils lose their classic banded appearance when earthworms obliterate their eluvial (A_{2}, Ae, or E) horizons.

== Effects ==
Invasive earthworms have caused a decrease in diversity, seedling populations, forest floor organic matter volume, and overall habitat quality. In addition, there is often an increase in invasive species and a decreased diversity of non-plant organisms. Some species that provide important biological niches to the ecosystem may be eradicated.

=== Effects on plants ===
Because earthworms take away valuable nutrients needed by plants, young plants may be unable to grow without the surface nitrogen source provided by the layer of detritus. Since young plants do not have the deep root systems that older trees have, they often cannot obtain enough nutrients to survive. Thus, few saplings or under-canopy plants grow to full maturity and generally only the larger trees with extensive root systems survive. The addition of earthworms to an environment has been shown to decrease mycorrhizal associations with roots. This adds to the problem of finding available nutrients for plants. Many different species of earthworms throughout Northern Minnesota and Wisconsin have been connected with the reduction of native plants. Specifically, trees like poplar, birch, and maple are disfavored by the change in habitat, as are many forest herbs like Aralia, Viola, and Botrychium. These plants are strongly negatively effected by the activity of invading earthworms. When a decrease in overall ground cover and canopy vegetation occurs, the few plants remaining are often eaten shortly after germination.

Generally, with the addition of earthworms to a forest, a decrease in diversity is observed, and often other exotic species follow that can survive the nutrient-diminished environment better than the natives. It has been observed that the presence of earthworms has a strong positive effect on the biomass of invasive plant species. For example, in newly invaded forests buckthorn and garlic mustard, both invasive species, increase notably in population density.

=== Effects on animals ===
When invasive earthworms cause a decrease in overall ground cover and canopy vegetation, food for other organisms becomes scarce. As a result, some organisms are forced to leave the areas. With decreased ground-level vegetation, many terrestrial organisms like insects, small mammals, and other vertebrates must compete for fewer resources, leading to decreased diversity and population. In addition, the native species of worms may be unable to compete with the introduced species because the native ones are not well adapted to the new conditions of the forest soil. For example, millipedes in particular are competing for resources with Asian earthworms in the southern Appalachian Mountains. Moreover, the decrease in plant biomass due to species richness affects earthworms is directly related to trophic levels. The lower trophic levels are affected less than the higher trophic levels.

== Origins ==
Most of the invasive earthworms are European or Asian and came over in soil during the 18th century as Europeans began settling the North American continent. The worms were originally transferred through the horticultural trade, probably in the soil bulbs of European plants carried to the Americas. Some earthworms have been brought over to be used as bait for fishing and escaped or got released. For example, at least one species of earthworm was introduced in Alaska as bait for anglers. The lack of competition from native earthworms allowed the invaders to flourish. Now recreational practices and construction methods are the primary mode of transportation for the earthworms. Their movement in the soil is slow, but with human transportation, they can migrate much faster. In addition, many are moved physically in soil through construction practices in dirt loads.

Certain characteristics of soil habitat may affect the ability of the earthworms to invade an environment. High salinity and sandy soils have greater resistance to earthworm spread. Low pH and the presence of plant matter with a high carbon-to-nitrogen ratio (C:N) may promote resistance; conversely, high pH and low C:N ratios appear to confer greater susceptibility.

=== Asian earthworms ===
More recently than the invasion of European earthworms, Asian earthworms have been introduced by human activities. Particularly of the genera Amynthas and Metaphire. These earthworms have a variety of nicknames due to their characteristic thrashing behavior, including "Asian jumping worms", "Alabama jumpers", "crazy worms", and "snake worms". The effects of invasive Asian earthworm species are much less documented than those of European lumbricid earthworms, but there is greater concern over the potential effects of jumping worms on soil structure and chemistry, nutrient cycling, forest regeneration, and animal and plant communities. Evidence shows that Asian earthworms grow more rapidly, reproduce more quickly, and have greater flexibility in their diet than European species. They can also exist at higher densities than European earthworm species. These characteristics may allow jumping worms to outcompete their European earthworm competitors. These traits mean that jumping worms can consume organic matter more rapidly, stripping the forest floor of organic matter and temporarily flooding the system with nutrients. Northeastern forests evolved under the slow decomposition and release of nutrients, and it is still unclear how forests are responding to the rapid breakdown of organic material.

== Prevention ==
There is no known way to remove the earthworms from the soil, so proposals have focused on ways to slow their spread. One simple measure is to reduce the number of worms released during fishing practices. The Minnesota Department of Natural Resources, in cooperation with local groups, has launched a public education campaign using posters in bait shops and other outreach efforts.

The movement of dirt from one location to the other could also be regulated so that dirt from areas where earthworms are common is not moved into forests without the invasive species. To prevent the spread of invasive earthworms, it is recommended that people should only purchase compost or mulch that has been heated to appropriate temperatures and duration to reduce pathogens and kill the earthworm cocoons, or eggs.

In areas that have already been colonized, the number of worms can be reduced by removal of introduced shrubs such as common buckthorn (Rhamnus cathartica) and honeysuckle (e.g., Lonicera × bella), which produce leaf litter favored by worms.

== Removal ==
A demonstration on the method of worm collecting called worm grunting.

One way invasive earthworms can be removed from the environment is worm grunting. Worm grunting is the act of vibrating a wooden stake that has been driven into soil to bring worms to the surface where they can be collected by hand.

Another way to remove invasive earthworms are mustard pours. Mustard pours are 1 US gallon (3.8 L) of water and 1/3 cup (~80 mL) ground yellow mustard seed mixed together. This is better for gardens because it can be poured over soil to drive worms to the surface without harming any plants.

== See also ==
- Earthworms as invasive species
- Asian jumping worm (Amynthas agrestis)
