= Indian blues =

Indian blues may refer to:

- Blues music in the music of India
- Perionyx excavatus, a commercially produced earthworm
