= Argilophilus =

Scientific classification
- Domain: Eukaryota
- Kingdom: Animalia
- Phylum: Annelida
- Clade: Pleistoannelida
- Clade: Sedentaria
- Class: Clitellata
- Order: Opisthopora
- Family: Megascolecidae
- Genus: Argilophilus

Species
- ?

Genus of annelids

Argilophilus is a genus of western North American earthworms of the family Megascolecidae that are characteristically found under native vegetation.

The genus also occurs in subcontinental India, however, the single Australian report of the type species, Argilophilus marmoratus, is erroneous.

One enigmatic species, Argilophilus hyalinus Eisen, 1900, is reported from Guatemala - known only from the description of a single, macerated specimen.

Argilophilus and several other native genera form a close-knit group with nearest relatives apparently in Australia and Southeast Asia.
