= Perionyx excavatus =

Scientific classification
- Domain: Eukaryota
- Kingdom: Animalia
- Phylum: Annelida
- Clade: Pleistoannelida
- Clade: Sedentaria
- Class: Clitellata
- Order: Opisthopora
- Family: Megascolecidae
- Genus: Perionyx
- Species: P. excavatus

Binomial name
- Perionyx excavatus Perrier, 1872

Species of annelid

Perionyx excavatus is a commercially produced earthworm. Popular names for this species include composting worms, blues, or Indian blues. This species is marketed for its ability to create fine worm castings quickly. It has recently become more popular in North America for composting purposes.

This species belongs to the genus Perionyx. It may have its origins in the Himalayan mountains. It is considered native to tropical East Asia, South Asia, and Southeast Asia.

This species is suited for vermicomposting in tropical and subtropical regions.
