= Anisochaeta (annelid) =

Scientific classification
- Kingdom: Animalia
- Phylum: Annelida
- Clade: Pleistoannelida
- Clade: Sedentaria
- Class: Clitellata
- Order: Opisthopora
- Family: Megascolecidae
- Genus: Anisochaeta; Beddard, 1890

Genus of annelid worms

Anisochaeta is a genus of annelids belonging to the family Megascolecidae.

The species of this genus are found in Australia and New Zealand.

Species:

- Anisochaeta aemula Blakemore, 2000
- Anisochaeta alba Blakemore, 2000
- Anisochaeta ancisa Blakemore, 2000
- Anisochaeta andrea Blakemore, 2000
- Anisochaeta angusticlavia Blakemore, 2000
- Anisochaeta aperta Blakemore, 1997
- Anisochaeta aterpaenulata Blakemore, 2000
- Anisochaeta brevis Blakemore, 2000
- Anisochaeta buckerfieldi Blakemore, 1997
- Anisochaeta bulla Blakemore, 2000
- Anisochaeta calpetana Blakemore, 2000
- Anisochaeta calvasaxea Blakemore, 2000
- Anisochaeta celmisiae Blakemore, 2000
- Anisochaeta cethana Blakemore, 2000
- Anisochaeta chani Blakemore, 2000
- Anisochaeta clavi Blakemore, 2000
- Anisochaeta conspecta Blakemore, 2000
- Anisochaeta corinna Blakemore, 2000
- Anisochaeta coxii (Fletcher, 1887)
- Anisochaeta eastoni Jamieson, 2000
- Anisochaeta erica Blakemore, 2000
- Anisochaeta felix Blakemore, 2000
- Anisochaeta filix Blakemore, 2000
- Anisochaeta flava Blakemore, 2000
- Anisochaeta floris Blakemore, 2000
- Anisochaeta garilarsoni Blakemore, 2000
- Anisochaeta gigantea (Benham, 1906)
- Anisochaeta greeni Blakemore, 2000
- Anisochaeta ima Blakemore, 2000
- Anisochaeta isla Blakemore, 2000
- Anisochaeta kiwi Blakemore, 2013
- Anisochaeta lata Blakemore, 2000
- Anisochaeta lavatiolacuna Blakemore, 2000
- Anisochaeta liberalis Blakemore, 2000
- Anisochaeta longiductis Blakemore, 1997
- Anisochaeta magna Blakemore, 2000
- Anisochaeta martha Blakemore, 2000
- Anisochaeta mawbanna Blakemore, 2000
- Anisochaeta megagaster Blakemore, 1997
- Anisochaeta metandris Blakemore, 2000
- Anisochaeta novaeangelica Blakemore, 2000
- Anisochaeta novocombei Blakemore, 1997
- Anisochaeta palustris Blakemore, 2000
- Anisochaeta paucula Blakemore, 2000
- Anisochaeta portusarturi Blakemore, 2000
- Anisochaeta proandris Blakemore, 2000
- Anisochaeta rava Blakemore, 2000
- Anisochaeta rubeospina Blakemore, 2000
- Anisochaeta scottsdalei Blakemore, 2000
- Anisochaeta sebastiani Blakemore, 1997
- Anisochaeta simpsonorum Blakemore & Kingston, 1997
- Anisochaeta stumpysinensis Blakemore, 2000
- Anisochaeta tamara Blakemore, 2000
- Anisochaeta toonumbari Blakemore, 2000
- Anisochaeta trichaeta Blakemore, 2000
- Anisochaeta tunicata Blakemore, 2000
- Anisochaeta vincula Blakemore, 2000
- Anisochaeta virgata Blakemore, 2000
- Anisochaeta yabbratigris Blakemore, 2000
- Anisochaeta zeehan Blakemore, 2000
