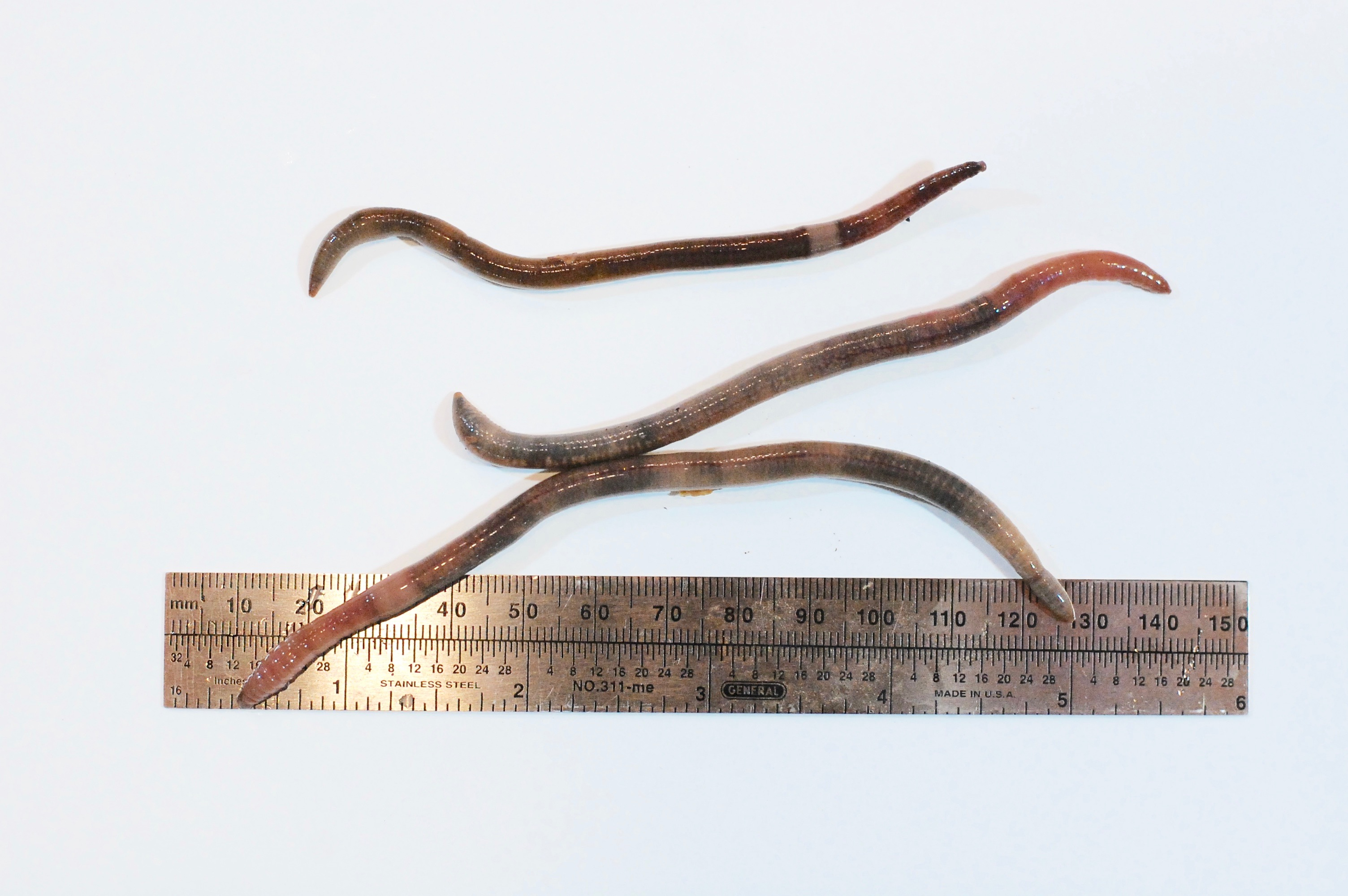

Conservation status
- Least Concern (IUCN 3.1)

Scientific classification
- Kingdom: Animalia
- Phylum: Annelida
- Clade: Pleistoannelida
- Clade: Sedentaria
- Class: Clitellata
- Order: Opisthopora
- Family: Megascolecidae
- Genus: Amynthas
- Species: A. agrestis

Binomial name
- Amynthas agrestis (Goto & Hatai, 1899)

= Amynthas agrestis =

Species of worm

Amynthas agrestis, the Asian jumping worm, (Note: The species goes by many common names, including the rustic jumping worm, the Alabama jumper, and the Asian crazy worm.) is a species of worm in the family Megascolecidae. It has a smooth, glossy, grey or brown body with a milky-white clitellum that is generally a collar-like band around their body. The length can range from 1.5 to 8 in (3.8 to 20.3 cm). Amynthas agrestis is located about 14-16 segments away from their head with a thick lifted, pinky appearance. Adult worms are able to reach the length of 10-13 centimeters. If they are disturbed, they move in a motion that mocks the movement of a snake, moving back and forth simultaneously. A. agrestis is also able to break off a piece of its tail segments in the attempt to escape predators. As a result, they have earned the nicknames of “crazy worm”, "jumping worm", and “snake worm”. Amynthas agrestis is native to Japan, Korea and Taiwan. They were introduced to North America due to increased human activity during the 19th century; it is considered to be an invasive species in the United States. Worms within the genus Amynthas (jumping worms) reproduce and develop quicker than their European counterparts.

== Ecology and Behavior ==
Amynthas agrestis are considered to be epigeic species, which means that its habitat and food source is generally considered to be in leaf litter and a few inches above the topsoil. A particular concern for Asian jumping worms is the excessive consumption of leaf litter, which affects the native soil's microbiological and species richness. The absence of leaf litter makes plants less deeply rooted and more vulnerable to being washed away by rain, while the removal of organic materials from the top soil affects the soil structure, making it less able to hold water and stunting plant growth. Compared to other popular earthworm species, they do not contribute much to soil aeration because they do not burrow very deeply and primarily stay in the topsoil. As a result, the worm castings resemble coffee grounds.

Numerous ecological experts have developed strategies to manage this invasive species. In grassy areas and some woodlands, controlled burning is one of the primary methods of controlling A. agrestis. This technique eliminates the species' primary food source, leaf litter, which should effectively control its population.

== Life cycle ==
The Asian jumping worm follows an annual life cycle. At least six months out of the year, it spends its time in the larval stage, then adults appear between May and August with a reproductive maturity period that is up to 60 days. Amynthas Agretis are typically young jumping worms that are hatched from egg-filled cocoons in between April and May. Egg filled cocoons resemble a mustard seed, making them harder to be found in the soil and creating a nice camouflage blend in their habitat. Between August and September the matured worms will start to reproduce and distribute their eggs into the nearby soil. Generally during this time the first patch of adults tend to freeze to death. Over the winter, the winter eggs are protected by their cocoons from the cold and the moisture.

Even when the adult worms perish, these cocoons can withstand the bitterly cold winter temperatures. When temperatures climb over 10 °C (50 °F) in the early to mid-spring, young worms emerge from their cocoons. The newborn worms are initially tiny and translucent, but when they eat organic matter and leaf litter, they grow rapidly and drastically change the structure of the soil. They mature in approximately two months, generally by midsummer. The smooth, milky-white clitellum that completely envelops the body makes it easy to identify adult A. agrestis, which are normally 3 to 5 inches long.

These worms reproduce by parthenogenesis, which enables populations to expand quickly because each individual can make cocoons without mating. Only the resilient cocoons in the soil remain to overwinter when the adult worms perish in late October due to a drop in temperature. When the next generation appears the following spring, the cycle is repeated.

== Invasiveness ==
Amynthas agrestis became a problem in the United States, specifically the Southern United States, during the 19th century. Concern is increasing about this invasive species.

Amynthas agretis was introduced to the United States from Asia. It is thought that international trade has provided human-mediated paths for transmission of organisms across the large bodies of water. Although the human-mediated path of how Asian jumping worms got to the United States is unclear, it is most likely due to horticulture. In the past decades, an increase in trade across the Pacific and the number of Asian invasive earthworm species has increased across North America. Biological invasions are a very significant problem on the global scale

An earthworm's job is extremely vital to the soil ecosystem. The organisms feeding and burrowing change the physical and biological characteristics of the soil. Therefore, when there is an invasive species within the soil it can cause mass destruction to the physical, chemical and biological properties of our soil

Amynthas agretis are so invasive due to a couple of their traits. They are rapid asexual reproducers, they reach maturity and reproduce very quickly, with potential for two generations every season. They have a large appetite and eat large amounts of the organic material on the soil surface, including leaves and mulch which depletes nutrients and can change the soil structure. Due to soil disruption, it can harm native plants and create a spongy, coffee-ground texture in the soil. Finally, in many areas, they do not have any natural predators which allows for their populations to flourish unchecked.

To prevent the spread, avoid buying and moving materials such as soil, compost, mulch, or potted plants from an infested area to a new location. Inspect the plant before planting, after gardening or working in an infested area, clean soil and debris off tools before moving somewhere else. When possible, purchase bare-root plants and do not use jumping worms as bait.

To dispose and control them, if you know an infested area, place the worms in a sealed plastic bag and leave in the sun for at least 10 minutes. Pouring dish soap and a water solution on them until they are dead, then seal the bag and throw it in the trash is also a solution. Finally, you can also do a heat treatment on them by spreading soil, mulch or compost on the plastic sheet in the direct sun. Then cover the material with a clear plastic sheet that can raise them to over 104 °𝐹, for three days which can kill the worms and cocoons.
