= Archipheretima =

Scientific classification
- Kingdom: Animalia
- Phylum: Annelida
- Clade: Pleistoannelida
- Clade: Sedentaria
- Class: Clitellata
- Order: Opisthopora
- Family: Megascolecidae
- Genus: Archipheretima; Michaelsen, 1928

Genus of earthworms

Archipheretima is a genus of earthworms within the family Megascolecidae. This genus is so far known to occur only in central and northern islands of the Philippines and Borneo. Members of this genus are unique from standard earthworms as rather than having a subterannean based lifestyle of burrowing in substrate, Archipheretima earthworms are often found in broad daylight crawling above ground in forest environments. Some species are also known to be arboreal, but thought to only exhibit it facultatively or during the early juvenile stages. Both juveniles and adults have being found on plant leaf axils in genera such as Pandanus and Freycinetia. Colorations of this genus are known to be intensely colored with hues atypical of earthworms. Colorations include deep blues, turquoise, and bright green cuticular iridescence. Some species also have patternings ontop of these colorations, with A. ophiodes having irregular white flecks on its dorsal side, and A. middletoni having patterns of scattered white spots with smaller yellow spots within that give the resemblance of fried eggs. Locals who live with these earthworms have also reported that individuals are capable of spraying a toxic fluid from their backs when disturbed.

== Species ==
- Archipheretima cofini James, 2009
- Archipheretima gritzae James, 2009
- Archipheretima iris (Michaelsen, 1892)
- Archipheretima margaritacea (Michaelsen, 1892)
- Archipheretima mazarredi (Rosa, 1894)
- Archipheretima middletoni James, 2009
- Archipheretima ophiodes (Michaelsen, 1929)
- Archipheretima pandanophila James, 2009
- Archipheretima picta (Michaelsen, 1892)
- Archipheretima ricei James, 2009
- Archipheretima zonata (Michaelsen, 1922)
