= Pithemera =

Scientific classification
- Kingdom: Animalia
- Phylum: Annelida
- Clade: Pleistoannelida
- Clade: Sedentaria
- Class: Clitellata
- Order: Opisthopora
- Family: Megascolecidae
- Genus: Pithemera; Sims & Easton, 1972

Genus of annelid worms

Pithemera is a genus of annelids belonging to the family Megascolecidae.

The species of this genus are found in Southeastern Asia.

Species:

- Pithemera altaresi Hong, 2018
- Pithemera bicincta (Perrier, 1875)
- Pithemera donvictorianoi Aspe & James, 2015
- Pithemera duhuani Hong & James, 2008
