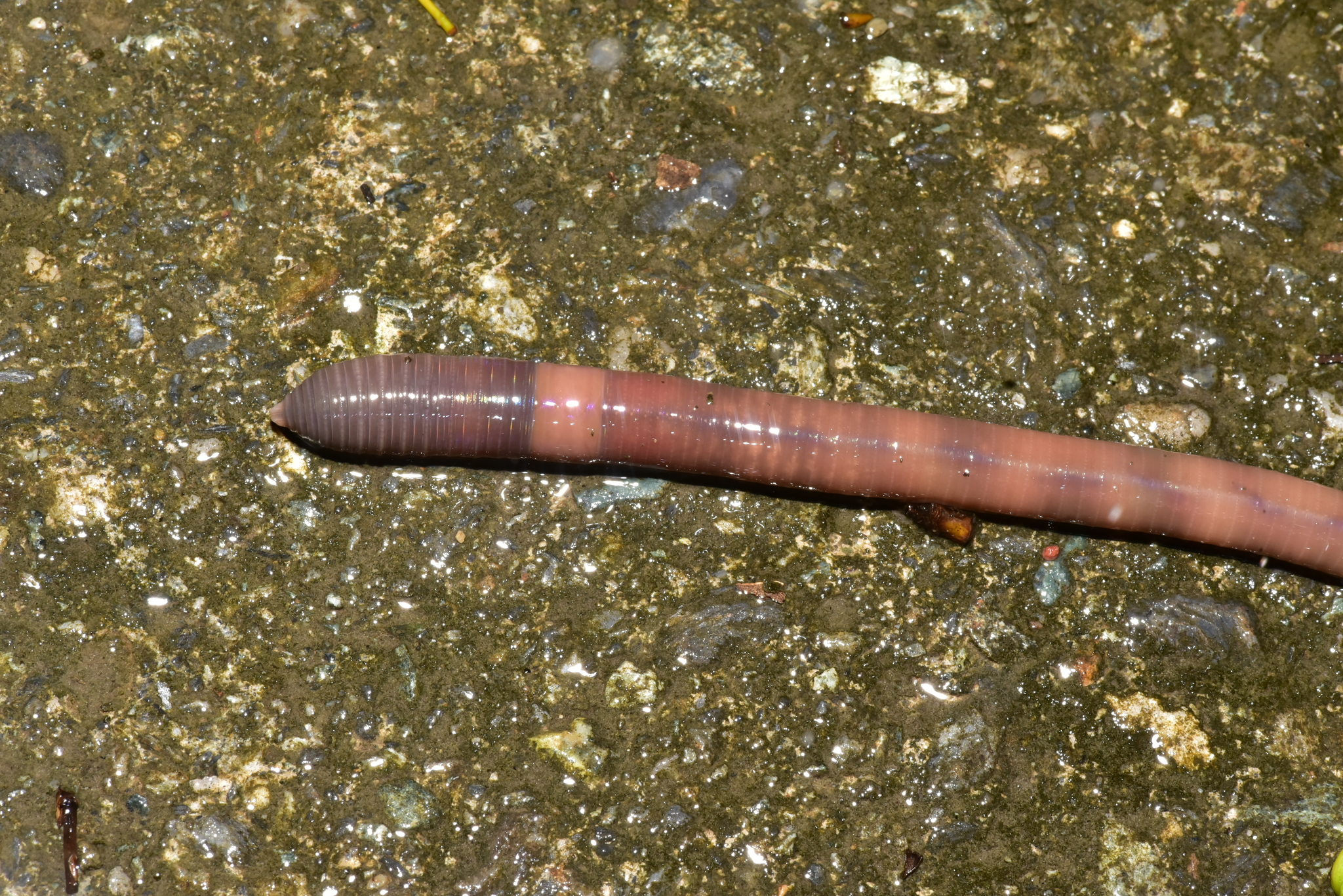
- Amynthas aspergillum (Taiwan)

Scientific classification
- Kingdom: Animalia
- Phylum: Annelida
- Clade: Pleistoannelida
- Clade: Sedentaria
- Class: Clitellata
- Order: Opisthopora
- Family: Megascolecidae
- Genus: Amynthas; Kinberg, 1867

= Amynthas =

Genus of annelid worms

Jumping behaviour.

Amynthas is a genus of earthworms in the family Megascolecidae. They are known as jumping worms, snake worms, or crazy worms because of their erratic thrashing behaviour when disturbed. The genus is native to East Asia, but they are invasive in many areas of the United States. They are a matter of concern in many states, as they disrupt the native forest ecology by affecting soil structure and chemistry.

== Appearance ==
Amynthas species can be differentiated from other earthworms by their clitellum, which is pale, annular, is close to the head, and lies flat against the body. They vary in size between 3.8 and 20.3 cm (1.5 and 8.0 in).

== Life cycle ==
Amynthas species' faster reproduction rate and their ability to reproduce asexually (parthenogenesis) has contributed to their spread into the United States. The worms reach maturity in 60 days, which allows them to have two hatches per year. Eggs are wrapped in small cocoons, which overwinter while the adults die off at the first freeze each year. The young then emerge the next spring.

== Species ==
- Amynthas agrestis (Goto and Hatai, 1899)
- Amynthas alexandri (Beddard, 1900)
- Amynthas assimilis (Hong & Kim, 2002)
- Amynthas auriculus (Chanabun & Panha, 2023)
- Amynthas baikmudongensis (Hong, 2017)
- Amynthas bantanensis (Chanabun & Panha, 2023 )
- Amynthas borealis (Panha & Bantaowong, 2011)
- Amynthas comptus (Gates, 1932)
- Amynthas defecta (Gates, 1930)
- Amynthas dorualis
- Amynthas exiguus (Gates, 1930)
- Amynthas fucosus (Gates, 1933)
- Amynthas gracilis (Kinberg, 1867)
- Amynthas hilgendorfi (Michaelsen, 1892)
- Amynthas hupbonensis (Stephenson, 1931)
- †Amynthas japonicus (Horst, 1883)
- Amynthas kinmenensis
- Amynthas longicauliculatus (Gates, 1931)
- Amynthas luridus (Shen, Chang, & Chih, 2019)
- Amynthas mekongianus (Cognetti, 1922)
- Amynthas minimus
- Amynthas mirifius
- Amynthas moakensis
- Amynthas morrisi (Beddard, 1892)
- Amynthas mujuensis
- Amynthas obsoletus
- Amynthas papulosus (Rosa, 1896)
- Amynthas phatubensis (Panha & Bantaowong, 2011)
- Amynthas polyglandularis
- Amynthas pulvinus
- Amynthas pyeongchangensis (Hong & James, 2009)
- Amynthas ruiyenensis (Shen, Chang, & Chih, 2019)
- Amynthas sakonnakhonensis (Chanabun & Panha, 2023)
- Amynthas sangumburi
- Amynthas siam (Blakemore, 2011)
- Amynthas srinan (Panha & Bantaowong, 2011)
- Amynthas taiwumontis
- Amynthas tessellatus
- Amynthas tokioensis (Beddard, 1892)
- Amynthas tontong (Panha & Bantaowong, 2011)
- Amynthas wuhumontis
- Amynthas wujhouensis
