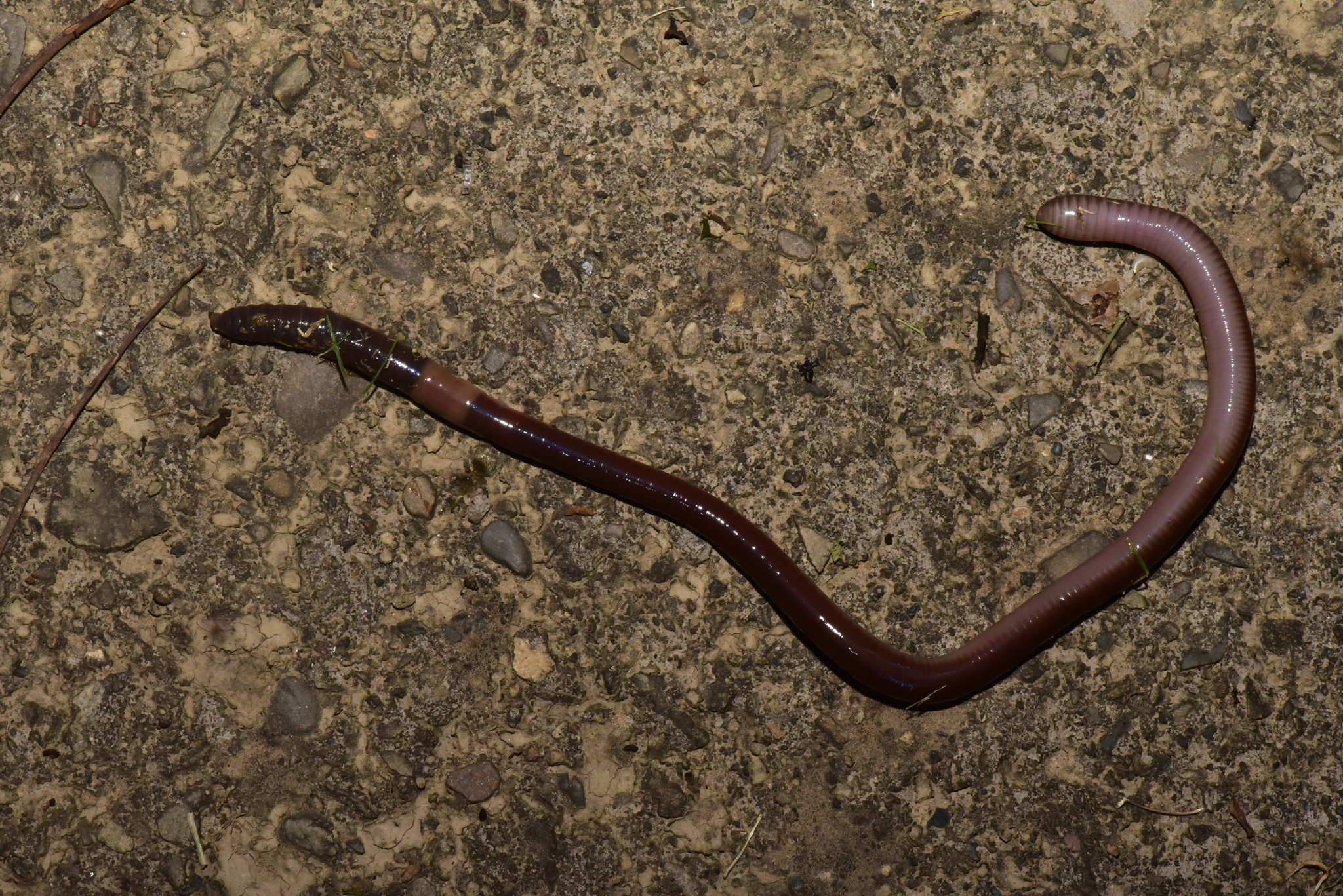
- Metaphire formosae

Scientific classification
- Kingdom: Animalia
- Phylum: Annelida
- Clade: Pleistoannelida
- Clade: Sedentaria
- Class: Clitellata
- Order: Opisthopora
- Family: Megascolecidae
- Genus: Metaphire; Sims & Easton, 1972

Synonyms
- Rhodopis Kinberg, 1866

= Metaphire =

Genus of annelid worms

Metaphire is a genus of annelids belonging to the family Megascolecidae. The species of this genus are found in south-eastern Asia.

== Species ==
The following species are recognised in the genus Metaphire:

- Metaphire acincta (Goto & Hatai, 1899)
- Metaphire anomala (Michaelsen, 1907)
- Metaphire bannaensis
- Metaphire bariaensis Nguyen, Nguyen, Lam & Nguyen, 2020
- Metaphire bifoliolare Tan & Zhong, 1987
- Metaphire biforatum Tan & Zhong, 1987
- Metaphire bindjeyensis (Michaelsen, 1899)
- Metaphire brevipenis Qiu, 1988
- Metaphire bununa C-F.Tsai, S-C.Tsai & Liaw, 2000
- Metaphire catbaensis (Thai & Le, 1993)
- Metaphire chaubinhensis (Do & Tran, 1994)
- Metaphire coacervata Qiu, 1993
- Metaphire coniporophorata (Thai & Samphon, 1989)
- Metaphire dacnomontis (Thai & Huynh, 1992)
- Metaphire dadingmontis Zhang, Li, Fu & Qiu, 2006
- Metaphire daliensis Yuan & Dong, 2019
- Metaphire decemtheca Nguyen, Lam & Nguyen, 2021
- Metaphire dipapillata (Thai & Tran, 1986)
- Metaphire doiphamon Bantaowong & Panha, 2016
- Metaphire dorsobitheca (Thai & Huynh, 1992)
- Metaphire dorsomultitheca Nguyen & Nguyen, 2015
- Metaphire easupana (Thai & Huynh, 1993)
- Metaphire extraopapillae Wang & Qiu, 2005
- Metaphire feijani C.-H.Chang & J.-H.Chen, 2004
- Metaphire fluvialoides (Huynh, 1998)
- Metaphire gastromonotheca (Do & Tran, 1995)
- Metaphire giengensis Nguyen, Lam & Nguyen, 2022
- Metaphire gjellerupi (Cognetti, 1914)
- Metaphire glandularis (Goto & Hatai, 1899)
- Metaphire glareosa Tsai, Tsai & Liaw, 2000
- Metaphire grandipenes Bantaowong & Panha, 2011
- Metaphire guarina (Rosa, 1894)
- Metaphire guizhouensis Qiu, Y.Hong & Wei, 1991
- Metaphire guizouensis Qiu, Hong & Wei, 1991
- Metaphire haenyeo Blakemore, 2012
- Metaphire haui Nguyen, Nguyen, Lam & Nguyen, 2020
- Metaphire hijauensis Ng & Panha, 2018
- Metaphire houlleti (Perrier, 1872)
- Metaphire houlletoides Nguyen, Nguyen, Lam & Nguyen, 2020
- Metaphire hunanensis Tan & Zhong, 1986
- Metaphire impudens (Michaelsen, 1899)
- Metaphire iranomala Nguyen, Lam & Nguyen, 2021
- Metaphire javanica (Kinberg, 1866)
- Metaphire khaochamao Bantaowong & Panha, 2016
- Metaphire khaoluangensis Bantaowong & Panha, 2016
- Metaphire khoii (Do & Tran, 1994)
- Metaphire kiengiangensis Nguyen & Trinh, 2015
- Metaphire kinki Blakemore, 2022
- Metaphire magna (Chen, 1938)
- Metaphire mangophiloides Nguyen & Le, 2015
- Metaphire matsuensis Shen, 2014
- Metaphire mochauana (Do & Huynh, 1991)
- Metaphire munglongmontis (Thai & Tran, 1986)
- Metaphire muuido Blakemore, Lee & Seo, 2015
- Metaphire nanaoensis Chang & Chen, 2005
- Metaphire nanlingmontis Zhang, Li, Fu & Qiu, 2006
- Metaphire neoexilis (Thai & Samphon, 1988)
- Metaphire nhani (Huynh & Nguyen, 2005)
- Metaphire nhuongi Nguyen, 2016
- Metaphire paiwanna C-F.Tsai, S-C.Tsai & Liaw, 2000
- Metaphire paka Blakemore, 2007
- Metaphire phaluongana (Do & Huynh, 1992)
- Metaphire planatoides Nguyen, Nguyen, Lam & Nguyen, 2020
- Metaphire praepinguis (Gates, 1935)
- Metaphire ptychosiphona Qiu & Zhong, 1993
- Metaphire puyuma C-F.Tsai, Shen & S-C.Tsai, 1999
- Metaphire quadripapillata (Michaelsen, 1899)
- Metaphire reclusa Yuan & Dong, 2019
- Metaphire rusydii Fahri, Amaliah & Nguyen
- Metaphire ryunome Blakemore, 2012
- Metaphire sanmingensis Sun, Jiang, Bartlam, Qiu & Hu, 2018
- Metaphire saxicalcis Bantaowong & Panha, 2016
- Metaphire sedimensis Ng & Panha, 2018
- Metaphire seponensis (Thai & Samphon, 1989)
- Metaphire setosa Nguyen, Nguyen, Lam & Nguyen, 2020
- Metaphire songbeensis Nguyen, Nguyen, Lam & Nguyen, 2020
- Metaphire songkhlaensis Bantaowong & Panha, 2016
- Metaphire songklaensis
- Metaphire surinensis Bantaowong & Panha, 2016
- Metaphire tahanmonta C-H.Chang & J-H.Chen, 2005
- Metaphire taiwanensis C-F.Tsai, S-C.Tsai & Shen, 2004
- Metaphire tanbode Blakemore, 2010
- Metaphire tengjhihensis C.-H.Chang & J.-H.Chen, 2014
- Metaphire thaibinhensis (Thai, 1984)
- Metaphire trangensis Bantaowong & Panha, 2016
- Metaphire travancorensis (Fedarb, 1898)
- Metaphire tripidoporophoratus (Thai & Nguyen, 1993)
- Metaphire trivandrana (Stephenson, 1916)
- Metaphire trutina C-F.Tsai, J-H.Chen, S-C.Tsai & Shen, 2003
- Metaphire tschiliensis
- Metaphire viridis Feng & Ma, 1987
- Metaphire wuzhimontis Qiu & Sun, 2013
- Metaphire yeni S-C.Tsai, Shen & C-F.Tsai, 2000
- Metaphire yuanpowa C-H.Chang & J-H.Chen, 2005
- Metaphire yuhsii (Tsai, 1964)
