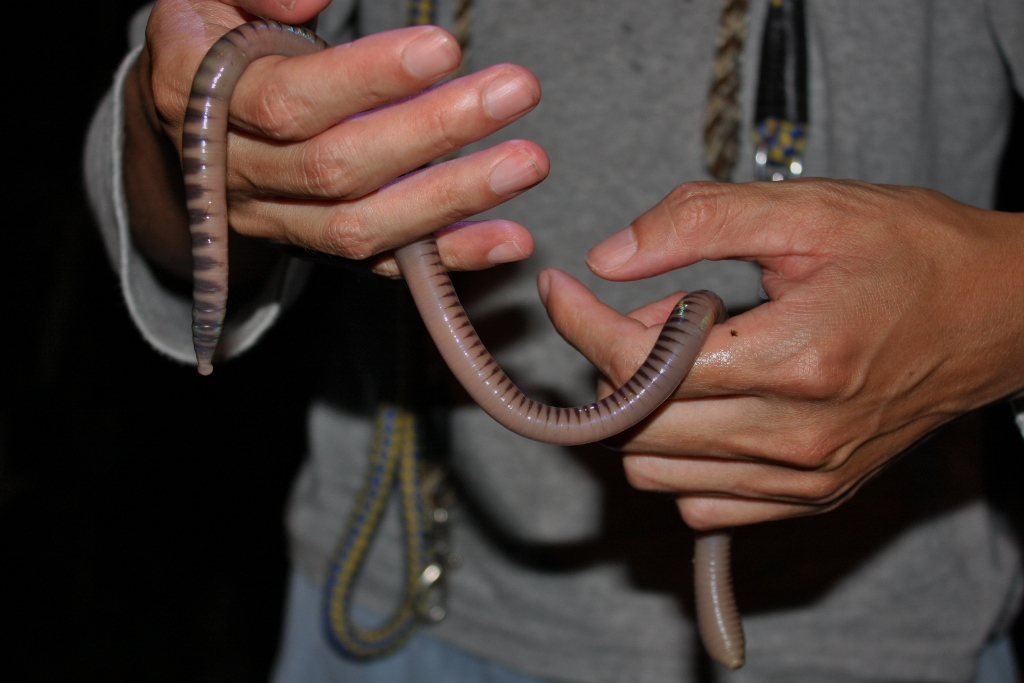
- Megascolecidae found in Sai Kung West Country Park, Hong Kong belonging to genus Amynthas

Scientific classification
- Kingdom: Animalia
- Phylum: Annelida
- Clade: Pleistoannelida
- Clade: Sedentaria
- Class: Clitellata
- Order: Opisthopora
- Suborder: Crassiclitellata
- Family: Megascolecidae; Rosa, 1891

Genera
- Over 65, see text

= Megascolecidae =

Family of annelid worms

Megascolecidae is a family of earthworms native to Madagascar, Australia, New Zealand, Asia, and North America. At up to 2 meters in length, their large size distinguishes the Megascolecidae from other earthworm families. They are an essential part of maintaining soil structure, minor carbon sequestration, and maintaining terrestrial ecosystems.

== Physiological features ==
Different species of the Megascolecidae have different physiological features, but some similarities of physiological features can be found between species. The family contains relatively large individuals. The length of earthworms can vary from 1.0 cm (0.39 in) to 2 m (6 ft 7 in). The number of spermathecal pores is normally paired, but multiples can be present in some species. The location of spermathecal pores and how they are positioned in different segmental locations is used in the identification of different megascolecidids.

Earthworms ingest a variety of organic materials in the soil since they live in terrestrial environments. Earthworms in this family have the ability to decompose lignocellulose, which requires assistance from microorganisms in their digestive system. Aside from microorganisms, digestive enzymes such as amylase and cellulase, and proteins can be found in different regions of the gut. Chemical digestion mainly occurs in the intestinal caeca of earthworms, which have higher protease activity than other parts of the gut.

Genital markings in the Megascolecidae family can be used to distinguish species.

== Reproductive system ==
The Megascolecidae are oviparous, laying eggs to reproduce. They are biparental. The ideal condition of reproduction for the megascolecidids is 25 °C, where the eggs hatch the quickest and have the highest cocoon production.

The male reproductive organ of the Megascolecidae includes testes, seminal vesicles, spermathecae, prostate glands, and spermathecal pores. The sperm can be found in testes and seminal vesicles, but cannot be found in spermathecae. The female reproductive organ consists of female pores, which normally occur in pairs. Both male and female reproductive organs are present in earthworms because they are monoecious. To breed, two earthworms exchange sperm. Long after they are separated, the egg case is secreted. It forms a ring around the worm, then the worm removes the ring from its body and injects its own eggs and the other worm's sperm into it. Afterwards, the egg case is sealed and ready to hatch, grow, and become a cocoon.

== Lifecycle ==
The Megascolecidae lifecycle takes around 50–57 days, depending on the external environments and habitat. The rate of growth during the first 14 days is very low, however; after 21–28 days, the rate of growth increases and then cycles up and down throughout the worm's life with no pattern. The growth rate of these worms is correlated to the temperature of their environment. As temperatures increase from 30 °C, a significant growth rate and decreasing the time to sexual maturity are seen. The ideal living temperature of megascolecidids is around 15–30 °C. Overall mean growth can range from 1.34–1.79 mg/day, depending on the abundance of worms, environmental conditions, and size. The cocoon production of Megascolecidae species also is correlated with the temperature of the environment.

== Distribution and habitat ==
Megascolecidae species can be found in Australia, New Zealand, Asia, North America, South America, and Europe. The intercontinental presence of Megascolecidae species can be explained by the Permanence of Continent Theory, which provides the explanation of most Cenozoic distributions; this theory, though, does not explain the presence of European Megascolecidae in North America. The intercontinental distribution of Megascolecidae has two different theories that explains its phenomenon; land bridges and continental drift.

The Megascolecidae family originated in Australia. Australia has a number of species that are native to different parts of the country; Anisochaeta sebastiani is an example. This species can be found from Queensland to Tasmania. Fifty-three known species of these earthworms can be found in Western Australia; Graliophilus georgei and G. secundus are some examples. G. zeilensis can be found in the Northern Territory, specifically in Mount Zeil, West MacDonnell Ranges. Graliophilus zeilensis also can be found on the highest point of the mountain where average rainfall of the region is 250 mm annually. This distinguishes them from other species from Graliophilus.

Metaphire and Amynthas are two common genera belonging to Megascolecidae. They can be found in different countries in Asia.

Eight different species of Metaphire can be found in Malaysia: M. sedimensis, M. hijaunensis, M..e songkhlaensis, M. pulauensis, M. pulauensis, M. fovella, M. balingensis, and M. strellana. These species are commonly found in soil containing medium to high organic material. such as loamy soil.

In Indonesia, 9 different genera can be found; Amynthas, Archipheretima, Metaphire, Metapheretima, Pheretima, Pithemera, Planapheretima, Pleinogaster, and Polypheretima. Pheretimoid is the biggest group of species, which consists of 65 species. Some intrageneric groups are restricted to mainland Asia, but others are native to Indo-Australian Archipelago.

The ideal habitat for Megascolecidae is a terrestrial environment with soil and with a high content of organic material, such as loamy soil, cattle or pig manure, and aerobically digested sewage sludge. Megascolecidae species grow and produce more cocoons during the summer than the winter, because their lifecycle is highly correlated to the temperature and humidity of the environment. Some Megascolecidae species have adapted to colder temperatures and drier areas, though, which enables them to live in higher-altitude regions of the land.

== Ecology ==
Megascolecidae form an important part of the soil ecosystem, in that they indicate soil health and maintain soil productivity. The abundance of earthworms is highly correlated to soil pH, texture, water content, and temperature. Earthworms have the ability to biomonitor soil pollutants. This is because of earthworms' burrowing habit serves to facilitate water flow and agrochemicals through the soil profile, so are able to perform carbon sequestration and reduce soil pollutants]. Invasive earthworms can have a significant impact causing changes in soil profiles, nutrient and organic matter content and other soil organisms or plant communities. In most cases the disturbed areas includes agricultural systems or previously areas that are lacking of earthworms would see the biggest impact of the invasive earthworms. The impact of earthworms on soil structure is due to the rate of net nitrogen mineralization.

== Genera ==
- Aceeca Blakemore, 2000
- Aridulodrilus Dyne, 2021
- Amphimiximus Blakemore, 2000
- Amynthas Kinberg, 1867
- Anisochaeta Beddard, 1890
- Anisogogaster Blakemore, 2010
- Aporodrilus Blakemore, 2000
- Archipheretima Michaelsen, 1928
- Arctiostrotus McKey-Fender, 1982
- Argilophilus Eisen, 1893
- Austrohoplochaetella Jamieson, 1971
- Begemius Easton, 1982
- Caecadrilus Blakemore, 2000
- Chetcodrilus Fender & McKey-Fender, 1990
- Comarodrilus Stephenson, 1915
- Cryptodrilus Fletcher, 1886
- Dendropheretima James, 2005
- Deodrilus Beddard, 1890
- Didymogaster Fletcher, 1886
- Digaster Perrier, 1872
- Diporochaeta Beddard, 1890
- Drilochaera Fender & McKey-Fender, 1990
- Driloleirus Fender & McKey-Fender, 1990
- Duplodicodrilus Blakemore, 2008
- Eastoniella Jamieson, 1977
- Fletcherodrilus Michaelsen, 1891
- Gastrodrilus Blakemore, 2000
- Gemascolex Edmonds & Jamieson, 1973
- Geofdyneia Jamieson, 2000
- Graliophilus Jamieson, 1971
- Haereodrilus Dyne, 2000
- Healesvillea Jamieson, 2000
- Heteroporodrilus Jamieson, 1970
- Hiatidrilus Blakemore, 1997
- Hickmaniella Jamieson, 1974
- Hypolimnus Blakemore, 2000
- Isarogoscolex James, 2005
- Kincaidodrilus McKey-Fender, 1982
- Lampito Kinberg, 1867
- Macnabodrilus Fender & McKey-Fender, 1990
- Megascolex Templeton, 1844
- Megascolides McCoy, 1878
- Metapheretima Michaelsen, 1928
- Metaphire Sims & Easton, 1972
- Nelloscolex Gates, 1939
- Nephrallaxis Fender & McKey-Fender, 1990
- Notoscolex Fletcher, 1886
- Oreoscolex Jamieson, 1973
- Paraplutellus Jamieson, 1972
- Pericryptodrilus Jamieson, 1977
- Perionychella Michaelsen, 1907
- Perionyx Perrier, 1872
- Perissogaster Fletcher, 1887
- Pheretima Kinberg, 1867
- Pithemera Sims & Easton, 1972
- Planapheretima Michaelsen, 1934
- Pleionogaster Michaelsen, 1892
- Plutelloides Jamieson, 2000
- Plutellus Perrier, 1873
- Polypheretima Michaelsen, 1934
- Pontodrilus Perrier, 1874
- Propheretima Jamieson, 1995
- Provescus Blakemore, 2000
- Pseudocryptodrilus Jamieson, 1972
- Pseudonotoscolex Jamieson, 1971
- Retrovescus Blakemore, 1998
- Scolecoidea Blakemore, 2000
- Sebastianus Blakemore, 1997
- Simsia Jamieson, 1972
- Spenceriella Michaelsen, 1907
- Tassiedrilus Blakemore, 2000
- Terrisswalkerius Jamieson, 1994
- Tonoscolex Gates, 1933
- Torresiella Dyne, 1997
- Toutellus Fender & McKey-Fender, 1990
- Troyia Jamieson, 1977
- Vesiculodrilus Jamieson, 1973
- Woodwardiella Stephenson, 1925
- Zacharius Blakemore, 1997
