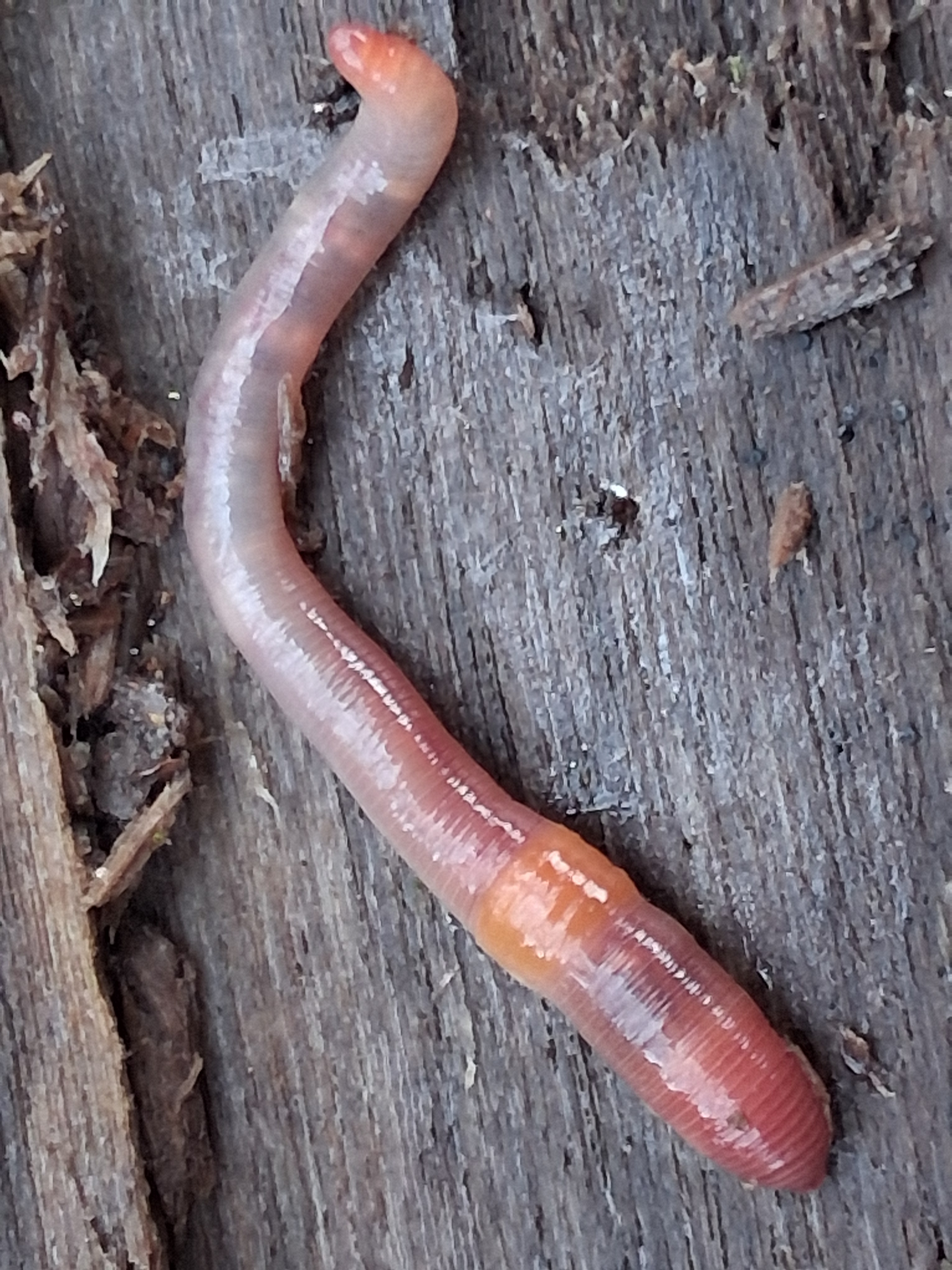
- Bimastos rubidus

Scientific classification
- Kingdom: Animalia
- Phylum: Annelida
- Clade: Pleistoannelida
- Clade: Sedentaria
- Class: Clitellata
- Subclass: Oligochaeta
- Superorder: Metagynophora
- Order: Opisthopora; Michaelsen, 1930

= Opisthopora =

Order of annelids

Opisthopora is an order of mostly terrestrial worms.

It is an order of the subclass Oligochaeta, which is distinguished by meganephridiostomal, male pores which open posteriorly to the last testicular segment. It includes the megadrile families of the mostly terrestrial true earthworms. There are currently eight known families.

== Families ==
- Eudrilidae
- Glossoscolecidae
- Lumbricidae
- Megascolecidae
- Moniligastridae
- Ocnerodrilidae
- Octochaetidae
