= Gustav Eisen =

Swedish-American zoologist, entomologist and naturalist (1847–1940)

- Born: August 2, 1847; Stockholm, Sweden
- Died: October 29, 1940; New York City, United States of America
- Education: University of Uppsala
- Known for: Studies of worms; Cultivation of raisins and figs
- Scientific career
- Fields: Zoology Horticulture
- Workplaces: California Academy of Sciences

Gustavus Augustus Eisen (August 2, 1847 − October 29, 1940) was a Swedish-American polymath. He became a member of California Academy of Sciences in 1874 and a Life Member in 1883. In 1893, he became the 'Curator of Archaeology, Ethnology, and Lower Animals' at the academy. He later changed titles to 'Curator of Marine Invertebrates'. In 1938, he was appointed as an 'Honorary Member', which is considered the highest honor from the academy.

== Biography ==
Eisen was born in Stockholm, Sweden, on August 2, 1847. He attended school at Visby and later graduated from the University of Uppsala in 1873. He came to California that same year to participate in a biotic survey sponsored by the Swedish Academy of Sciences. He decided to make California his home and joined the California Academy of Sciences the following year.

He was known to have diverse interests, including "art and art history, archeology and anthropology, agronomy and horticulture, history of science, geography and cartography, cytology, and protozoology, as well as marine invertebrate zoology"

A 2012 article in the San Francisco Chronicle describes him as, "One of those 19th century polymaths, Eisen also studied malaria-vector mosquitoes, founded a vineyard in Fresno, introduced avocados and Smyrna figs to California, campaigned to save the giant sequoias, and wrote a multivolume book about the Holy Grail."

He is perhaps best known for his studies of oligochete worms and many species were named after him including those in the genus Eisenia. In addition, he is considered to have been responsible for the introduction of the avocado and the smyrna fig to California and he wrote a detailed history of figs.

He was a correspondent of Charles Darwin and his work was referenced twice by Darwin in The Formation of Vegetable Mould through the Action of Worms.

Mt. Eisen, in the Sierra Nevada in California, was named after him.

== World renowned ==
Eisen's opinions were sought on the practicalities of new horticulture crops in Australia. His advice was valued in fig cultivation and in processing grapes into raisins.

== Organisms named after him ==
Earthworms

- Achaeta eiseni Vejdovsky
- Diplocardia eiseni Michaelsen
- Eisenia eiseni Levinsen
- Eisenia Malm
- Eisenia fetida
- Eisenia hortensis
- Eisenia andrei
- Eiseniona Omodeo
- Eisenoides Gates
- Eiseniella Michaelsen
- Eukerria eiseniana Rosa
- Fridericia eiseni Dózsa-Farkas

Brown algae

- Eisenia Areschoug
- Eisenia bicyclis
- Eisenia arborea Areschoug

Vascular Plants

- Phacelia eisenii Brandegee
- Bacopa eisenii (Kellogg) Pennell
- Clarkia eiseniana Kellog
- Ranunculus eiseni Kellog

Mosquitoes

- Anopheles eiseni Coquillett

Ant

- Atzeca foreleg eiseni Pergande

Hymenoptera

- Anthidiellum eiseni PergaCockerell
- Centris eisenii Fox
- Mesostenus eisenii Ashmead

Grasshopper

- Brachystola eiseni Bruner

Copepods

- Diaptomus eiseni Liljeborg

Zygoptera

- Enallagma eiseni Calvert

Tipulidae

- Erioptera eiseni Alexander

Diptera

- Hermetia eiseni Townsend
- Zophina eiseni Townsend

Spider

- Linyphia eiseni Banks
- Pardosa eiseni Thorell

Snake

- Tantilla eiseni Stejneger

Fish

- Xenotoca eiseni Rutter

== Publications ==
- Eisen, G.A. 1888. On the anatomy of Sutroa rostrata, a new annelid of the sub-family Lumbriculina. Memoirs of the California Academy of Sciences 2(1):1–9.
- Eisen, G.A. 1890. The raisin industry. A practical treatise on the raisin grapes, their history, culture and curing. Available online at https://archive.org/details/raisinindustrypr00eise.
- Eisen, G.A. 1893. Anatomical studies on new species of Ocnerodrilus. Proceedings of the California Academy
- of Sciences, ser. 2, 3:228–290.
- Eisen, G.A. 1894. On California Eudrilidae. Memoirs of the California Academy of Sciences 2(3):21–62.
- Eisen, G.A. 1895. Pacific Coast Oligochaeta I. Memoirs of the California Academy of Sciences 2(4):63–122.
- Eisen, G.A. 1896. Pacific Coast Oligochaeta II. Memoirs of the California Academy of Sciences 2(5):123–200.
- Eisen, G.A. 1897. Plasmocytes; the survival of the centrosomes and archoplasm of the nucleated erythrocytes, as free and independent elements in the blood of Batrachoseps attenuatus Esch. Proceedings of the California Academy of Sciences, ser. 3, Zoology, 1(1):1–72.
- Eisen, G.A. 1897. Explorations in the Cape Region of Baja California. Journal of the American Geographical Society of New York, Vol. 29, No. 3 (1897), pp. 271–280.
- Eisen, G.A. 1899. Notes on North-American earthworms of the genus Diplocardia. Zoological Bulletin Vol. 2, No. 4, Feb., 1899 . https://www.jstor.org/stable/10.2307/1535422
- Eisen, G.A. 1900. Researches in American Oligochaeta, with especial reference to those of the Pacific coast and adjacent islands. Proceedings of the California Academy of Sciences, ser. 3, Zoology, 2(2):85–276.
- Eisen, G.A. 1900. Explorations in the Cape Region of Baja California. Journal of the American Geographical Society of New York. https://www.jstor.org/stable/10.2307/197262
- Eisen, G.A. 1900. The Spermatogenesis of Batrachoseps. Polymorphous spermatogonia, auxocytes, and spermatocytes. Journal of Morphology. DOI: 10.1002/jmor.1050170102.
- Eisen, G. A. 1901. The fig: its history, culture, and curing, with a descriptive catalogue of the known varieties of figs. Available online here: https://archive.org/details/figitshistorycul00eise.
- Eisen, G.A. 1903. The earthquake and volcanic eruption in Guatemala in 1902. Bulletin of the American Geographical Society. https://www.jstor.org/stable/10.2307/197952.
