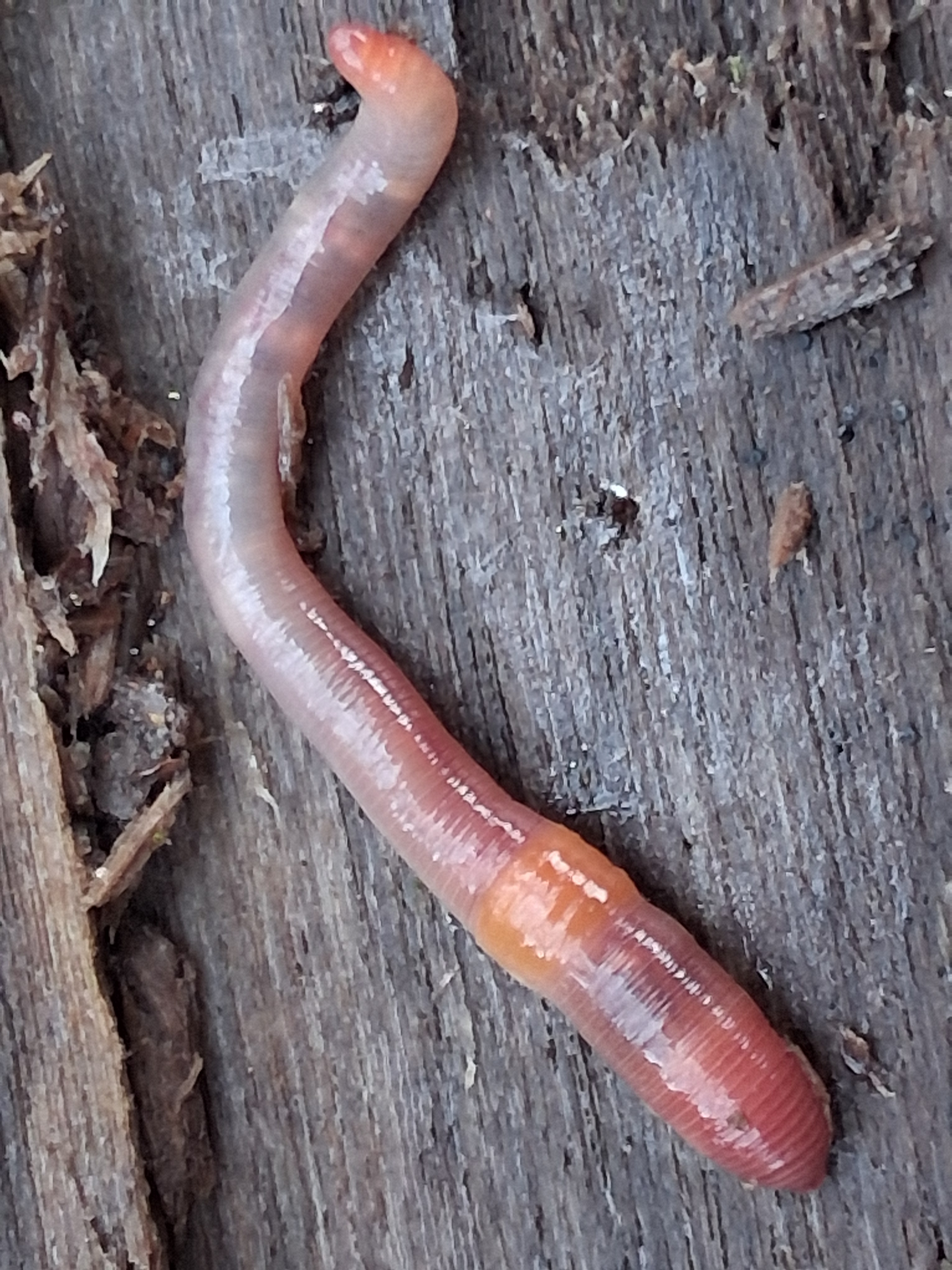
- In Norfolk, England

Scientific classification
- Kingdom: Animalia
- Phylum: Annelida
- Clade: Pleistoannelida
- Clade: Sedentaria
- Class: Clitellata
- Order: Opisthopora
- Family: Lumbricidae
- Genus: Bimastos
- Species: B. rubidus

Binomial name
- Bimastos rubidus (Savigny, 1826)

Subspecies
- See text

Synonyms
- List: Enterion rubidum Savigny, 1826; Allolobophora subrubicunda Eisen, 1873; Allolobophora norvegicus Eisen, 1874; Allolobophora tenuis Eisen, 1874; Dendrobaena rubida Omodeo, 1956; Dendrodrilus rubidus Blakemore, 2008

= Bimastos rubidus =

Bimastos rubidus Temporal range: Early Holocene - recent, 0.01–0 Ma

Species of annelid worm

Bimastos rubidus is a species of earthworm in the family Lumbricidae. Formerly placed in its own genus and referred to as Dendrodrilus rubidus, it is now believed to be a member of the genus Bimastos. It is a widespread introduced species, occurring on every continent except Antarctica, as well as many islands. Though originally believed to be native to Europe, fossil and genetic evidence suggests that it actually originated in North America. It is sometimes used to produce vermicompost and as fishing bait, and is marketed under many nonspecific names, including red wiggler, jumping red wiggler, red trout worm, jumbo red worm, and pink worm. Other common names include bank worm, tree worm, and gilt tail.

Highly variable in appearance, individuals of this species may appear red-violet, chestnut brown or even a bright purplish colour, with the colouration being darker on the upper side than on the underside. Measuring 2 to 9 cm (1 to 4 in) in length and 2 to 4 mm (0 to 0 in) in width, the body of this worm is divided into many segments, with the exact segment that certain structures are located on varying between individuals. These variations have been used to classify individuals into four different forms, though they differ only in physical anatomy and not on the genetic level. Some of these forms reproduce sexually while others are parthenogenetic, capable of producing offspring without fertilisation. Members of this species are hermaphroditic, bearing both male and female reproductive organs.

Though it prefers cool, moist conditions in substrate with large amounts of organic matter, this species is highly adaptable and can inhabit a wide range of habitats such as woodlands, caves and the nests of ants. It is even tolerant of polluted soils, having been found in areas contaminated with chemicals such as arsenic, copper and nickel. This adaptability has allowed it to colonise many areas outside of its native range, which it typically reaches when unintentionally transported in soil, timber or plants, or when bait worms are discarded by anglers. In such areas it is typically considered an invasive species, as its activity alters soil and leaf litter in ways that can cause the local extinction of native species.

== Taxonomy ==
In 1821, French zoologist Marie Jules César Savigny conducted research on earthworms found within Paris, France. His findings were published in 1826 as part of a journal article edited by French zoologist Georges Cuvier, which summarised the work conducted by the French Academy of Sciences. During his research, Savigny discovered 22 different earthworm species within the vicinity of the city. Among these was a species that he determined was unknown to science at the time, and he gave it the scientific name Enterion rubidum. Over a century later, Italian biologist Pietro Omodeo revised the classification of earthworms. Believing that this species belonged to the genus Dendrobaena, he erected the subgenus Dendrodrilus within this genus and assigned the species to it in 1956, thus renaming it as Dendrobaena (Dendrodrilus) rubida. Later authors would elevate Dendrodrilus to genus level, making it a monotypic genus with D. rubidus as its only species.

A molecular study published in 2017 revealed that this species (known as Dendrodrilus rubidus at the time) is more closely related to some species of the genus Bimastos than to others, such that Bimastos as recognised at the time was a paraphyletic grouping. The authors therefore declared that the species should be included as a species of Bimastos, thus renaming it as Bimastos rubidus. Because Dendrodrilus included no other species and was established after Bimastos was, the former genus became a junior synonym of the latter.

=== Forms and subspecies ===
Based on differences in internal and external anatomy, experts have proposed that a number of different forms of this species exist, with some authors even considering these forms to be separate subspecies or species. By the end of the 20th Century, some recognised up to four such forms as valid:

Species form	Trinomial authority	Description
B. r. rubidus (Nominate subspecies)	(Savigny, 1826)	Clitellum (collar-like thickened section) on segment 25 or 26 to 31, spermathecae (sperm-receiving organs) sometimes present but often empty, indistinct tubercles on the underside of segments 29 to 30.
B. r. norvegicus	Eisen, 1874	Clitellum on segments 26 to 32, two pairs of spermathecae clearly visible on segments 9 to 10, tubercles indistinctly visible on the underside of segments 29 to 30 or completely absent.
B. r. subrubicundus	Eisen, 1873	Clitellum on segments 25 or 26 to 31 or 32, two pairs of fluid-filled spermathecae on segments 9 to 10, wide rectangular tubercles clearly visible on the underside of segments 28 to 30.
B. r. tenuis	Eisen, 1874	Clitellum on segments 26 to 31, with no spermathecae or tubercles.

A 2017 study analysed individuals of the rubidus, subrubicundus and tenuis forms found in North America, concluding that despite the anatomical differences, they do not differ on a molecular genetic level. This same conclusion was reached by a paper published in 2023 that studied individuals found in Russia and Belarus. Therefore, these variants should not be considered as subspecies but merely species forms that differ only morphologically.

== Description ==
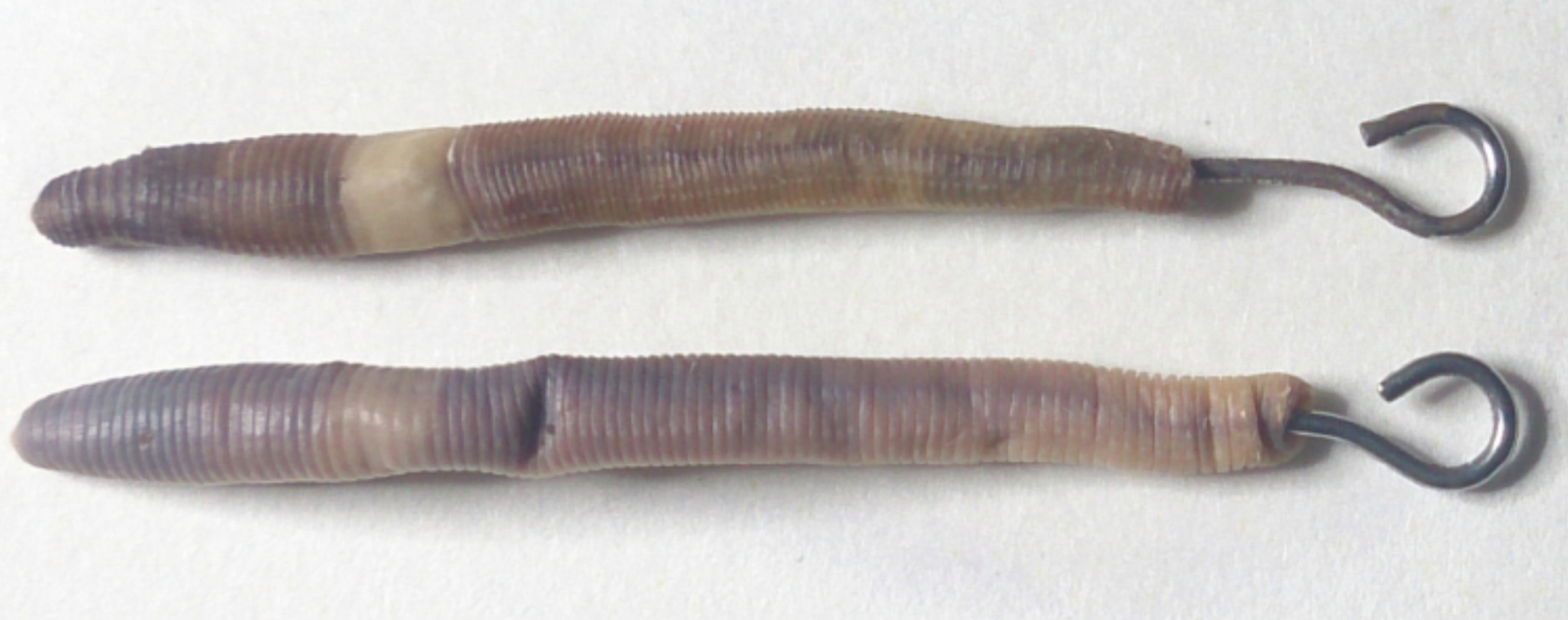
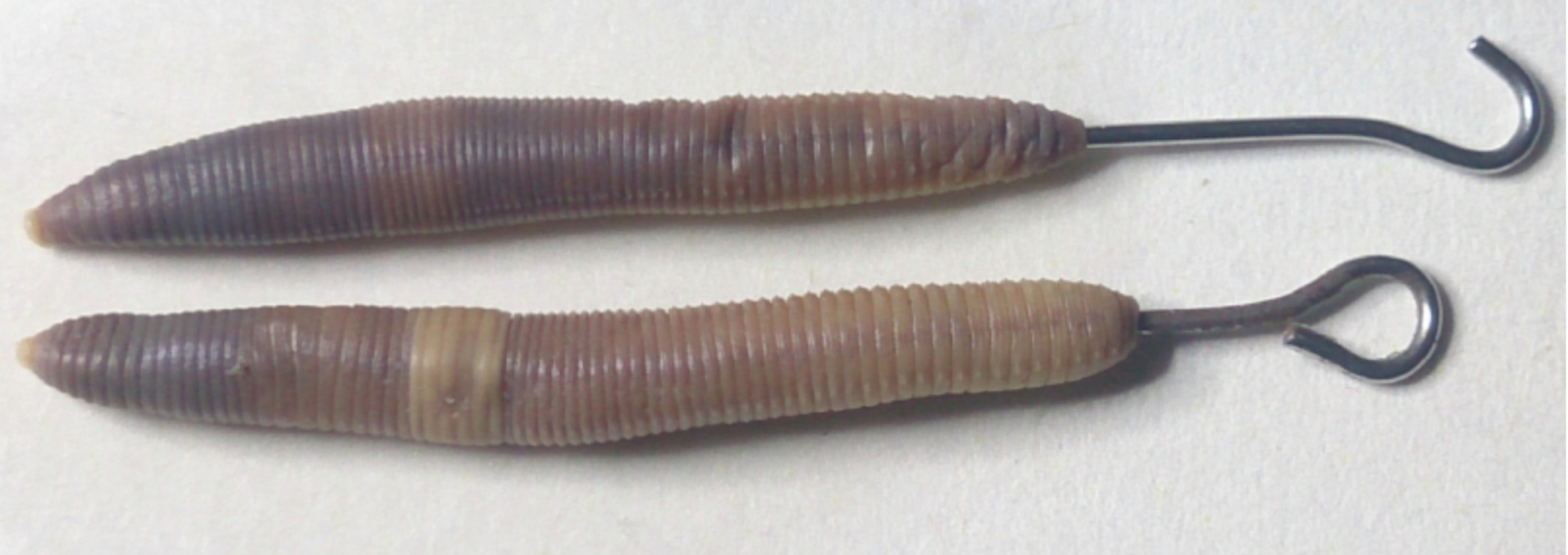
Specimens showing the variation in pigmentation within this species

The body of this earthworm measures 2 to 9 cm (1 to 4 in) long and 2 to 4 mm (0 to 0 in) wide. The upper side is typically darker in colour than the underside, though exact colouration is variable. For example, a 2017 paper focused on North American specimens stated that this species has red-violet colouration. Meanwhile, a 2023 study found that individuals from Western Siberia are chestnut brown, whilst those from European Russia, the northwest Caucasus and Belarus are a bright purplish colour. Some worms from the Caucasus are evenly purple across the entire body, but most individuals have more intense pigmentation in the head end than in the tail end.

The first segment (known as the prostomium) has overlapping lobes, a condition described as "epilobous". The body segments possess hair-like setae arranged in pairs, with the pairs on the worm's sides being more widely spaced than those on the underside. The clitellum (thickened, collar-like section) has a shape resembling that of a saddle, and is located from segments 25 or 26 to 31 or 32, with the exact positioning varying between forms. Swollen glandular structures known as the "tubercula pubertatis" are visible on the underside of the clitellum in some but not all individuals, occurring from segments 28 or 29 to 30 if at all. This species is hermaphroditic and individuals possess both male and female reproductive organs, with the sperm-releasing male pore and the egg-releasing female pore located on segments 15 and 14 respectively. Swollen tumescences are visible around the male pore, but not beyond segment 15. Small openings known as "dorsal pores" are present on the upper side of most of the body segments. The first dorsal pore is typically located in the groove between the fifth and sixth segments, though individuals in which there is such a pore between the fourth and fifth segments are also known.

Internally, the earthworm's body segments are divided by thin walls of tissue known as "septa", with those between the fifth and eleventh segments being slightly thicker. The tenth to twelfth segments contain the calciferous glands, which have bulges known as diverticula on the part within the tenth segment. A pair of large excretory organs known as nephridia stretch throughout all but the last segments of the body, a condition described as "holoic". The inside of the intestine bears a distinct fold called a typhlosole, which has a lamelliform (plate-like) structure. The internal structure of the reproductive system is variable between individuals; some have two pairs of sperm-receiving organs known as spermothecae while others lack them entirely, and each individual has either three or two pairs of seminal vesicles.

== Distribution and habitat ==
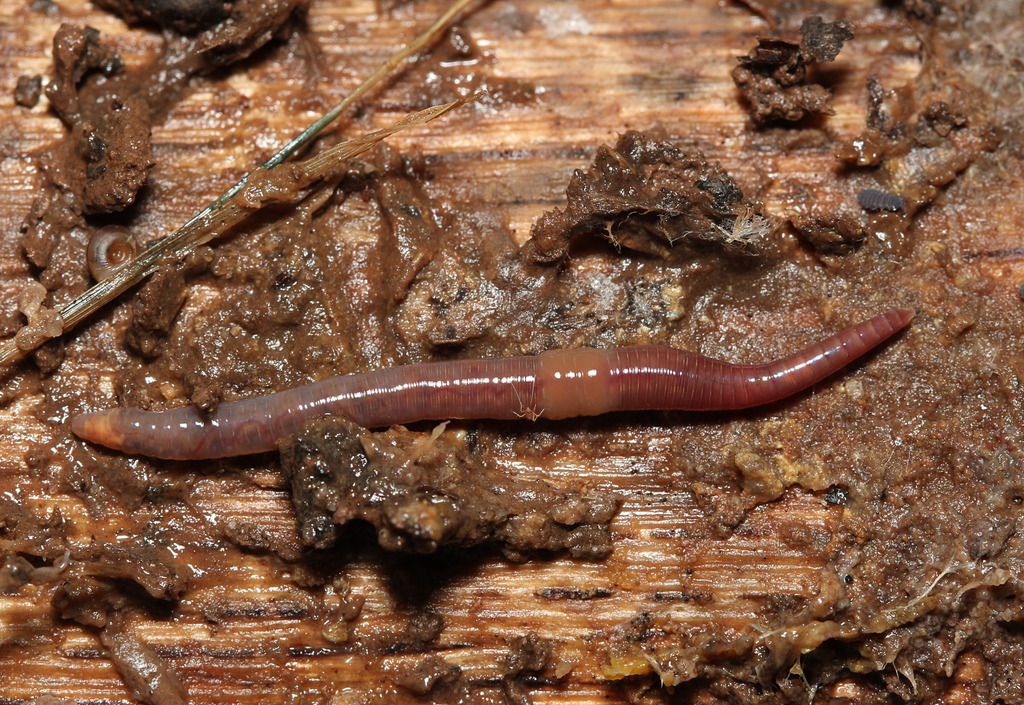
Inhabiting rotting wood in Saarland, Germany

This is an epigeic species, one which occurs on the soil surface in leaf litter and in the top layers of the soil, up to 10 centimeters deep. It prefers substrates rich in organic material, such as rotting wood and other plant matter, compost, peat, and manure. Cool and moist conditions are also ideal for it, likely explaining why tropical populations commonly occur at high altitudes. An acid-tolerant species, it is commonly found in the acidic litter of coniferous forests in North America and Europe, but is highly adaptable and also occurs in many other habitat types. Caves are another habitat it is known to occur in, and the species is regularly found in biological surveys of North American caves. However, this is likely a harsh habitat for this worm as it lacks specialist adaptations for surviving in caves. In the forests of Finland, it is known to inhabit the organic soils of the nest mounds of the red wood ant (Formica aquilonia), and it may help to keep the nests free of fungi. This earthworm is tolerant of soils with high levels of heavy metals and toxic semimetals. It has been observed in mine spoils contaminated with arsenic and in nickel- and copper-contaminated soils near smelting operations.

This is one of many earthworms that are now familiar worldwide as introduced and sometimes invasive species, and can be found on every continent except Antarctica, but does occur on many subantarctic islands. Individuals have probably been exchanged back and forth between different continents, being transported unintentionally with the import of soil, timber and plants. Another common way this species spreads is through the release of individuals used as fishing bait, as bait worms are commonly lost and dumped in the habitat on fishing trips.

Previously, this species was thought to have originated in Europe, and the North American populations were therefore designated as non-native. Experts formerly believed that the Upper Midwest region of the United States has no native modern earthworms, the last native taxa having been wiped out during the Ice Age. Bimastos rubidus was theorised to have been one of multiple earthworm species introduced by European settlers, being unintentionally transported in the soil used as ballast for their ships. However, the discovery of a fossilised B. rubidus cocoon from lake sediment deposited over 10,000 years ago in Ontario, Canada revealed that this species was present in North America long before the first European settlers arrived. This is further supported by a study published in 2017, which determined via genetic analysis that the closest relatives of B. rubidus are species native to North America, and that it is only distantly related to European species. Therefore, B. rubidus may actually be native to North America and introduced to Europe instead.

== Biology ==
=== Reproduction ===
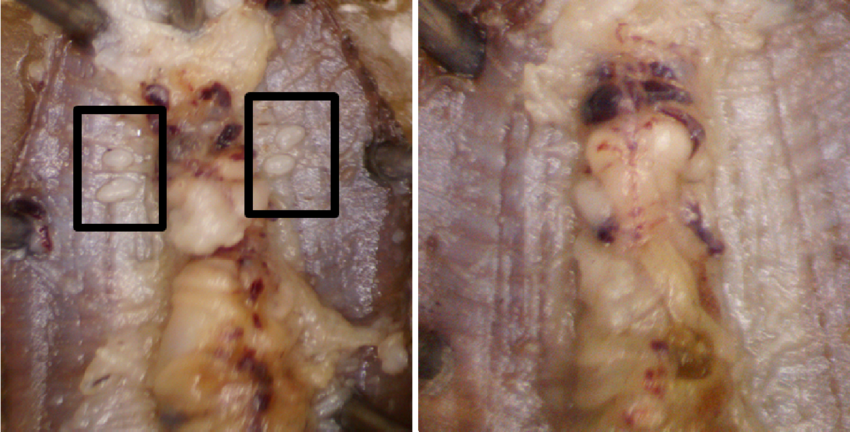
Internal anatomy of a sexually reproducing specimen with two pairs of spermothecae (left) and a parthenogenetic one which lacks them entirely (right)

Bimastos rubidus is a species capable of multiple modes of reproduction, as there are morphs that reproduce sexually and ones which do so by parthenogenesis (producing young without fertilisation). Individuals of parthenogenetic forms lack spermathecae, as they do not require sperm to reproduce and thus have no need for such organs, and the evolution of such forms is believed to have occurred multiple separate times. Like other earthworms, this species lays eggs which are encased in cocoons, with each cocoon containing multiple eggs. On average, each cocoon has an incubation time of 22 days, after which 1 to 3 hatchlings will emerge, with roughly 85% of cocoons hatching successfully. The young worms grow rapidly, capable of gaining 3.84 mg (0.000135 oz) in weight each day and reaching sexual maturity 54 days after hatching. The species has a high rate of reproduction, and can complete its life cycle in 75 days. However, growth rate is variable between different forms, with the B. r. norvegicus form having a lower growth rate and longer juvenile stage than the B. r. tenuis form. Temperature also affects individual growth rate, with experiments revealing that B. r. tenuis can mature in 7 to 10 weeks if kept at 20 °C (68 °F), but is still in the juvenile stage after 300 days if kept at only 2 °C (36 °F).

While the worms themselves are sensitive to cold temperatures, the cocoons are very cold-hardy. Those of the B. r. tenuis form can stay viable over the winter in temperatures below −40 °C (−40 °F). In an experiment, 50% of a sample of cocoons kept in liquid nitrogen at a temperature of −196 °C (−320.8 °F) for 24 hours still had viable embryos. Their ability to survive such cold comes from their very low water content and the presence of cryoprotectant compounds such as sorbitol. In cold climates the adults die off and the cocoons overwinter, a new generation emerging when temperatures rise.

=== As an invasive species ===
Bimastos rubidus and other epigeic earthworms are considered invasive in parts of their range where they are non-native because they alter the composition and stratification of the leaf litter on the forest floor as they consume it. In addition, their tunnelling activity can physically disturb the roots of plants and mycorrhizal networks. This alters the ecosystems involved with the various soil horizons, a change which has a cascading effect through other ecosystems. Communities of soil invertebrates, microorganisms and understory plants can be altered in abundance and distribution after non-native earthworms invade an area, potentially leading to the local extinction of rare species. The impacts are further exacerbated when multiple invasive earthworm species of different ecological niches are present in the same area. There are no good control methods for exotic earthworms that do not have the potential to affect other organisms, so prevention of introductions is more important.

== Uses ==
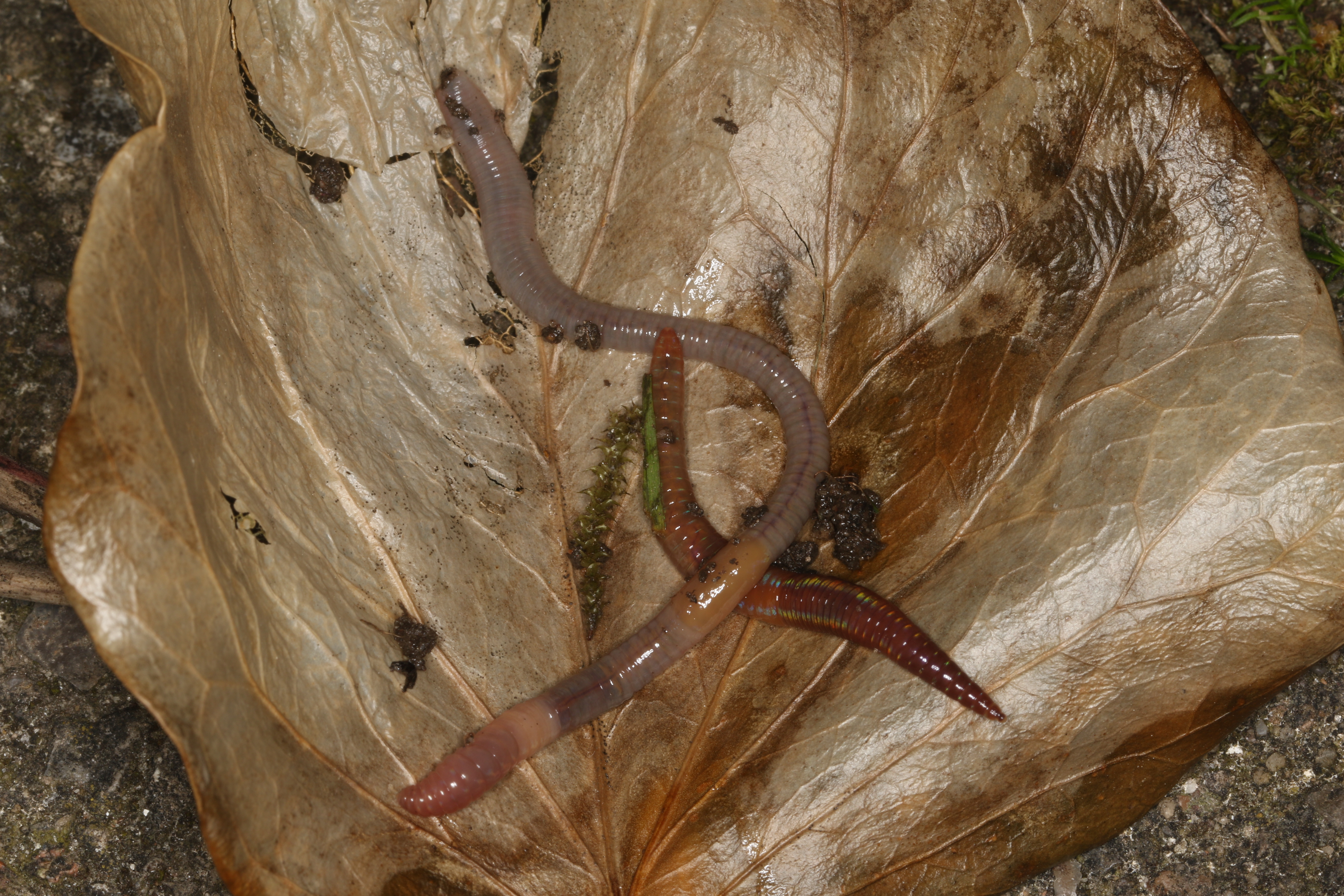
Bimastos rubidus (the longer worm) and Lumbricus rubellus (the shorter worm) are both commonly used as fishing bait and sometimes mislabelled as each other

Bimastos rubidus is one of many earthworm species used as fishing bait, often collectively known as "nightcrawlers" to anglers. It is one of several species sold in American bait shops as "red wigglers", with a 2007 study finding that 61% of the sampled bait shops had this species available for sale, making it the third most commonly available bait species (after Lumbricus terrestris and Lumbricus rubellus). Other common names that this species is sold under include jumping red wiggler, red trout worm, jumbo red worm, and pink worm. However, many of these names are also used for different species, and thus reveal little about which species is actually being sold. B. rubidus can often be found in shipments of worms labelled as another species, such as L. terrestris or L. rubellus.

Additionally, this species has been reared to decompose food waste and produce vermicompost, a practice known as vermiculture. Its high reproductive rate and tolerance of a wide range of environmental conditions make it a good candidate for vermicomposting. However, it is seldom used in vermiculture, with other species such as Eisenia andrei, Eisenia fetida and Dendrobaena veneta being more commonly used.

== See also ==
- Earthworms as invasive species
