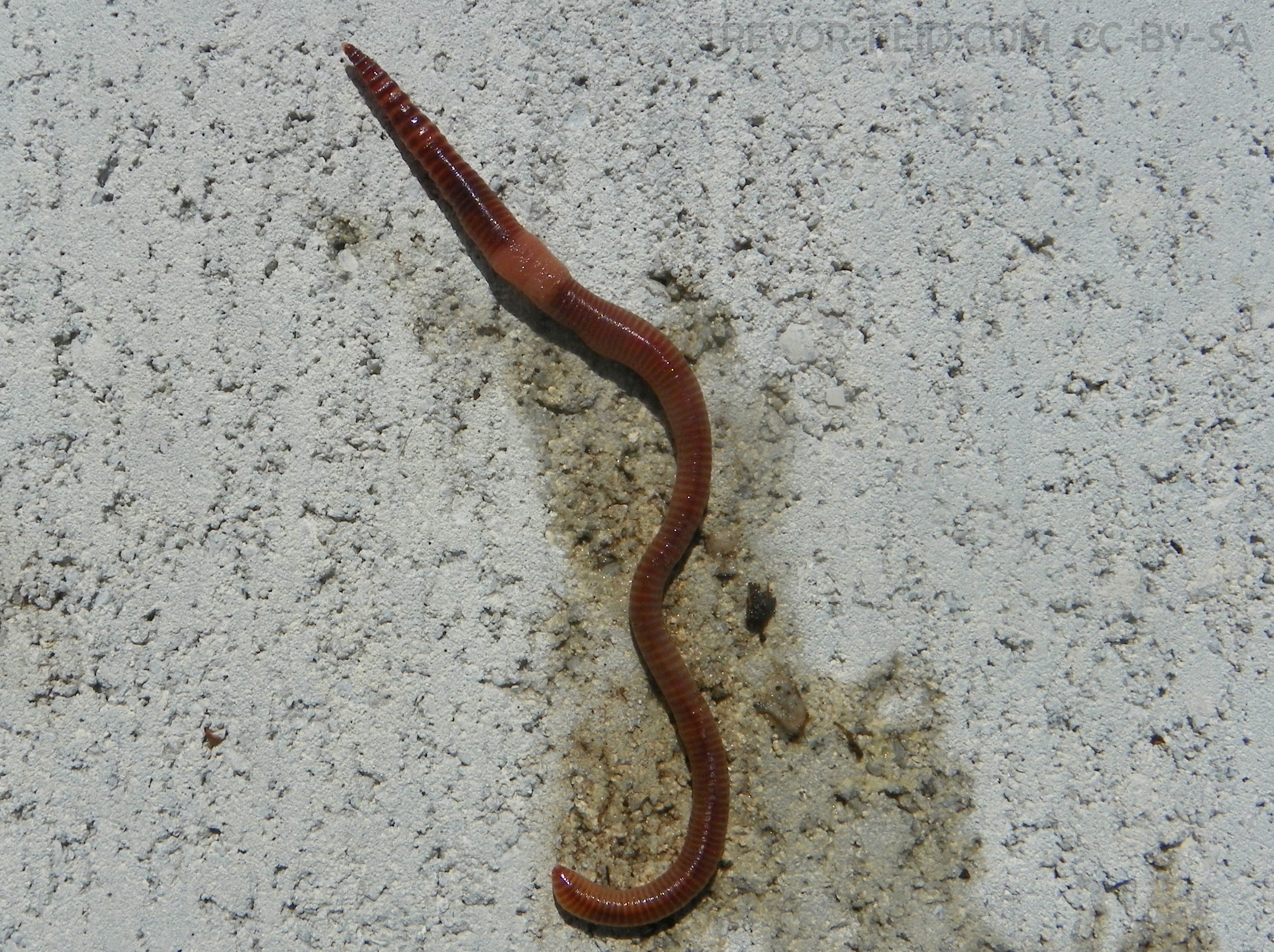

Scientific classification
- Kingdom: Animalia
- Phylum: Annelida
- Clade: Pleistoannelida
- Clade: Sedentaria
- Class: Clitellata
- Order: Opisthopora
- Family: Lumbricidae
- Genus: Dendrobaena
- Species: D. hortensis

Binomial name
- Dendrobaena hortensis (Michaelsen, 1890)

Synonyms
- Eisenia hortensis; Dendrobaena veneta (Rosa, 1886) var. hortensis

= Dendrobaena hortensis =

Species of annelid

The European nightcrawler (Dendrobaena hortensis) is a medium-small earthworm averaging about 1.5 g when fully grown. Generally blueish, pink-grey in color with a banded or striped appearance, the tips of their tails are often cream or pale yellow. When the species has not been feeding, it is pale pink. The species is usually found in deep woodland litter and garden soils that are rich in organic matter in European countries. D. hortensis is sold primarily as a bait worm, but its popularity as a composting worm is increasing.

It was considered part of Eisenia until 2003. It was also formerly considered part of the similar Dendrobaena veneta, but now just part of the species complex. Both are useful compost worms. The two species are probably not distinguished in vermicomposting. In general, the E. hortensis name is more common in North America while the D. veneta name is more common in Europe.

== Etymology ==
The former genus Eisenia is named after Swedish scientist Gustav Eisen. According to the International Code of Zoological Nomenclature, the specific name hortensis ("of the garden") is derived from Latin hortus meaning "garden".

The other specific epithet veneta refers to the Veneto region of northern Italy.

== Usage ==
Compared to Eisenia fetida, D. hortensis does best in an environment with a higher carbon to nitrogen ratio. This makes it well suited to compost pits high in fibrous materials commonly known as browns. European nightcrawlers can be invasive and should be used only in contained compost systems in parts of the world with northern deciduous and boreal forest ecosystems.

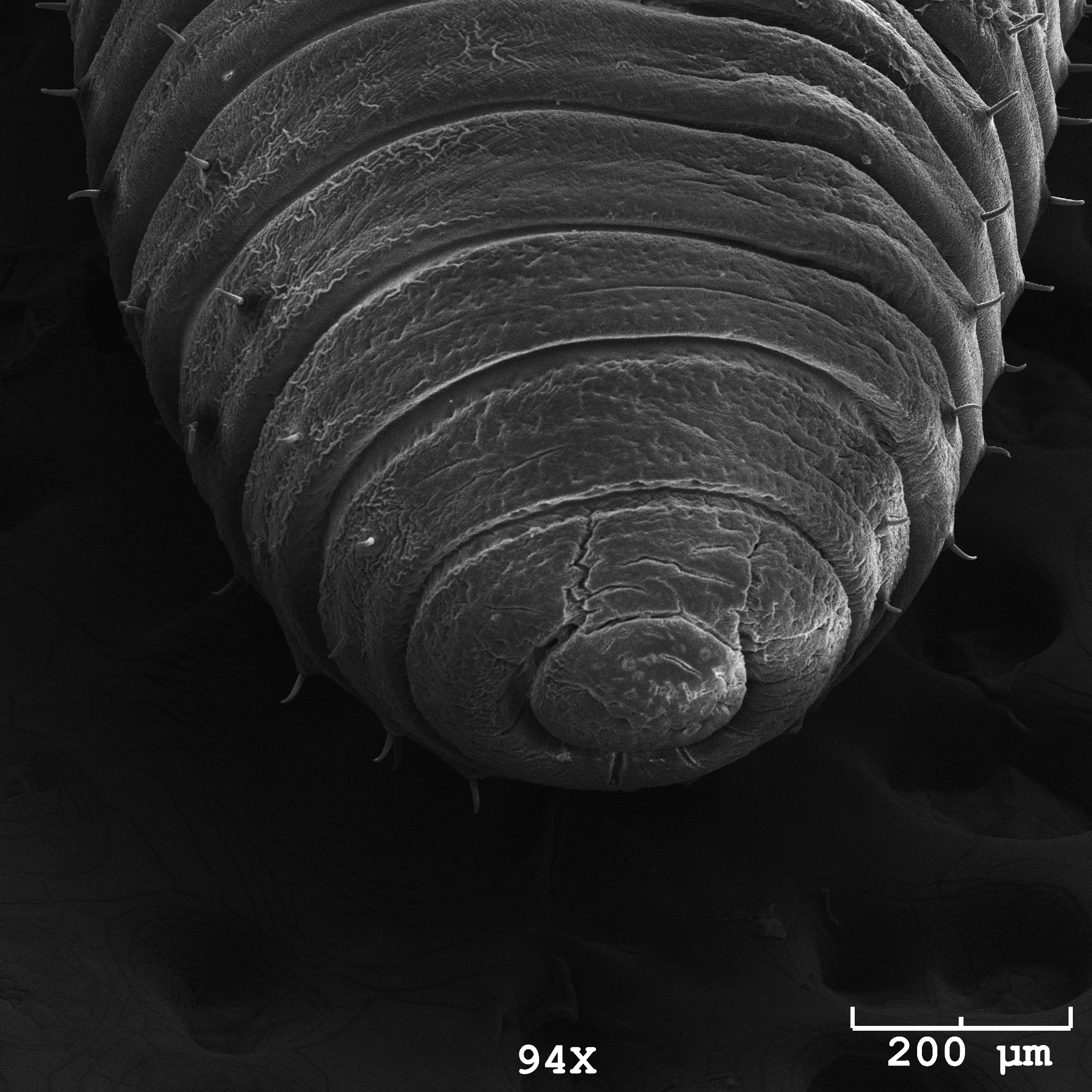
Scanning electron micrograph of a newly hatched European nightcrawler (Dendrobaena hortensis)

== Reproduction ==
D. hortensis, as a hermaphrodite, has both male and female reproductive organs. In mating, the weaker partner is forced into the female role, which is more expensive in terms of biological reproduction costs, for a sperm cell is generally less massive and energy-demanding than an ovum (egg cell), which is the female reproductive cell (gamete) in anisogamous organisms. Two worms join clitella, the large, lighter-colored bands that contain the worms' reproductive organs, and are only prominent during the reproduction process. The two worms exchange sperm. Both worms may secrete cocoons that contain an egg each. These cocoons are lemon-shaped and are pale yellow at first, becoming more brownish as the worms inside become mature. These cocoons are clearly visible to the naked eye.

Statistics

- From egg to sexual maturity is about 20 weeks.
- Net reproduction of 0.8 eggs per adult per week occurs.
- Egg cells are oviposited in a cocoon.
- One E. hortensis embryo per egg per cocoon occurs.

== Size and life stages ==
When purchasing European nightcrawlers, both size and quantity are important considerations, because they reflect the worms' age and reproductive maturity. Different size options commonly offered by suppliers correspond to distinct life stages and typical uses:

=== Cocoons (eggs) ===
Cocoons are the reproductive cases that contain developing embryos. Purchasing cocoons is appropriate for buyers who want to establish or expand a population from the very beginning and are willing to wait for the worms to hatch and mature. Cocoons require careful handling and appropriate environmental conditions to hatch successfully.

=== Juvenile ===
Juvenile nightcrawlers are young worms that have hatched but have not yet reached sexual maturity. They are well suited for long-term composting projects because they will continue growing and reproducing over time. Juveniles generally consume and process organic material effectively as they develop into adults.

=== Breeders / Adults ===
Breeder or adult nightcrawlers are fully mature worms that are capable of rapid reproduction. These are the most commonly sold stage, particularly by suppliers aiming to provide worms that will quickly establish a breeding population and accelerate waste processing in composting systems. Adults are generally preferred when immediate composting performance and quick population growth are desired.
