= Octolasion tyrtaeum =

Scientific classification
- Kingdom: Animalia
- Phylum: Annelida
- Clade: Pleistoannelida
- Clade: Sedentaria
- Class: Clitellata
- Order: Opisthopora
- Family: Lumbricidae
- Genus: Octolasion
- Species: O. tyrtaeum

Binomial name
- Octolasion tyrtaeum Savigny in Cuvier, 1826

Species of earthworm

Octolasion tyrtaeum, also known as the woodland white worm, is a species of earthworm in the family Lumbricidae.

== Taxonomy ==
Octolasion tyrtaeum is a species of earthworm in the genus Octolasion and the family Lumbricidae. It is believed that the species may be the same as O. lacteum.

== Habitat ==
Occurring in a large variety of soil and habitat types, O. tyrtaeum is widespread across the globe, and is more common in wet soil.

== Environmental impact ==
A large population of O. tyrtaeum in the Northwest Himalayan forest has been recorded influencing soil nutrient dynamics, reducing microbial and microarthropod communities, and significantly reducing litter thickness, organic layers, C/N ratio and soil PH. In 2023, it and O. cyaneum were recorded in Turtuk, a village in Ladakh which previously had no earthworm records.

== Description ==
The species is generally whitish-grey in colour. Can either be small (4-8 cm long) or large (10-14 cm). These differences in size are not environmental; they belong to different mtDNA lineages. The first dorsal pore 9/10-12/13, and the total number of segments generally ranges from 76-136. Clitellum is saddle shaped on segments 30-35, the prostomium is epilobic, and the tubercula pubertatis on segments 31-34. Nedriphores are aligned and obvious. Bladders are elongated and ocarina-shaped, and the spermatheca are always empty.

== Life cycle ==
This species is parthenogenetic. Under lab conditions, the incubation period ranged from 30-45 days, with fertile cocoons changing colour from a pale yellow, to a light pink/red during hatching, then black. Infertile cocoons turned black after a few days. Most cocoons held 2-3 hatchlings.
