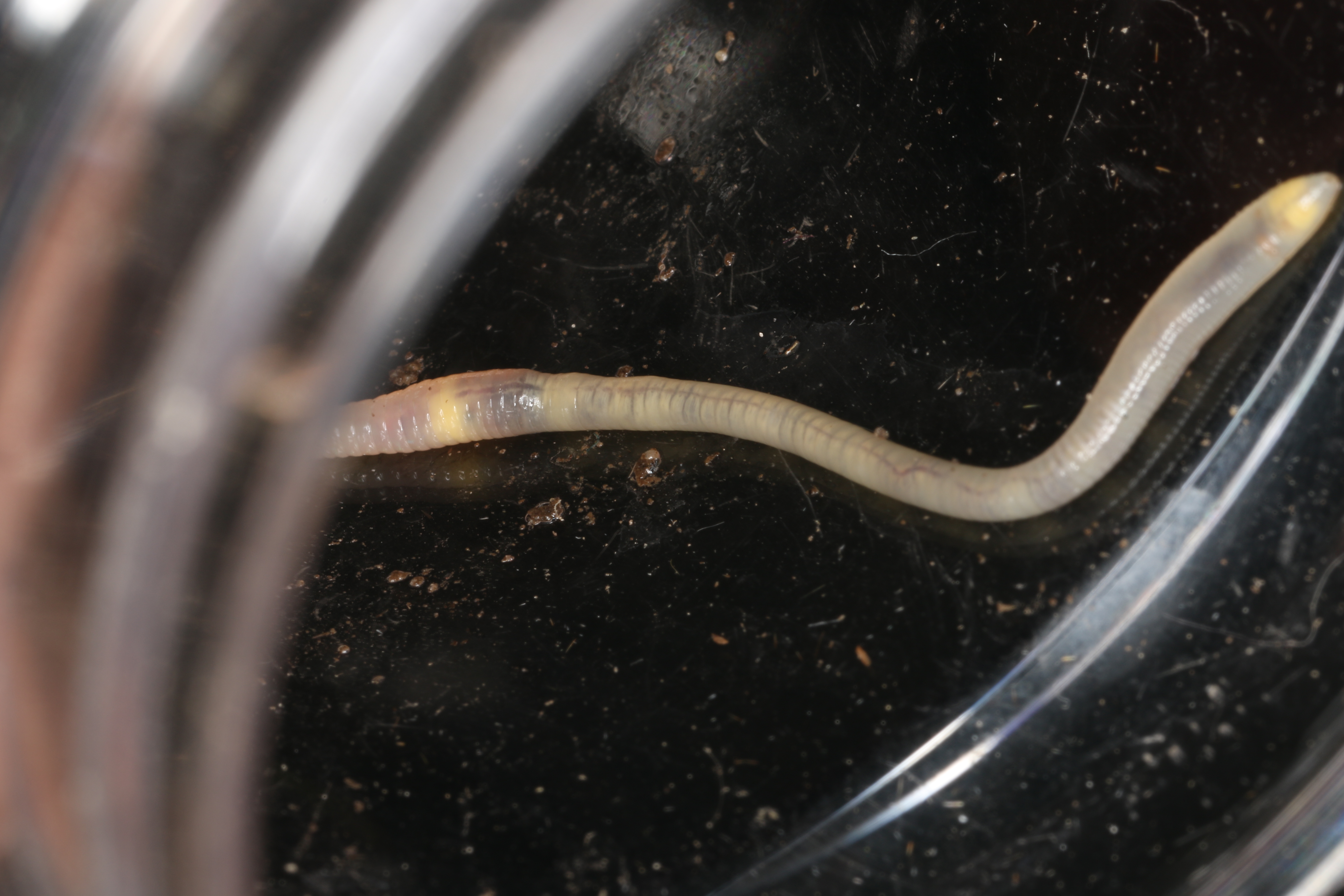
- Example of Bimastos rubidus

Scientific classification
- Kingdom: Animalia
- Phylum: Annelida
- Clade: Pleistoannelida
- Clade: Sedentaria
- Class: Clitellata
- Order: Opisthopora
- Family: Lumbricidae
- Genus: Bimastos; Moore, 1893

Type species
- Bimastos palustris Moore, 1895

Species
- Bimastos parvus; Bimastos rubidus; Bimastos palustris; Bimastos eiseni; Bimastos longictumidus; Bimastos heimburgeri; Bimastos schwerti; Bimastos welchi

Synonyms
- Allolobophoridella Mršić, 1990; Dendrodrilus Omodeo, 1956

= Bimastos =

Genus of annelid worms

Bimastos is a genus of lumbricid worm thought to be native to North America but has since been introduced to every continent apart from Antarctica. Recent molecular analysis has subsumed Dendrodrilus and Allolobophoridella under this genus. The clade holding Bimastos and Eisenoides seems to have diverged from Eurasian lumbricid Eisenia during the Late Cretaceous, approximately 69.2–76.1 million years ago. This, along with the discovery of an earthworm cocoon attributed to B. rubidus from lake sediment dated over 7,000 years old in Ontario, Canada contradicts the widely held notion that Bimastos and its junior synonyms are invasive worms from Europe which have colonized North America. Its ancestors likely entered North America via the Bering Land bridge or the De Geer route and colonized elsewhere after European contact. This genus is one of the few native earthworms in previously glaciated North American environments; for example, it appears to be the only extant earthworm native to the Alaskan interior.

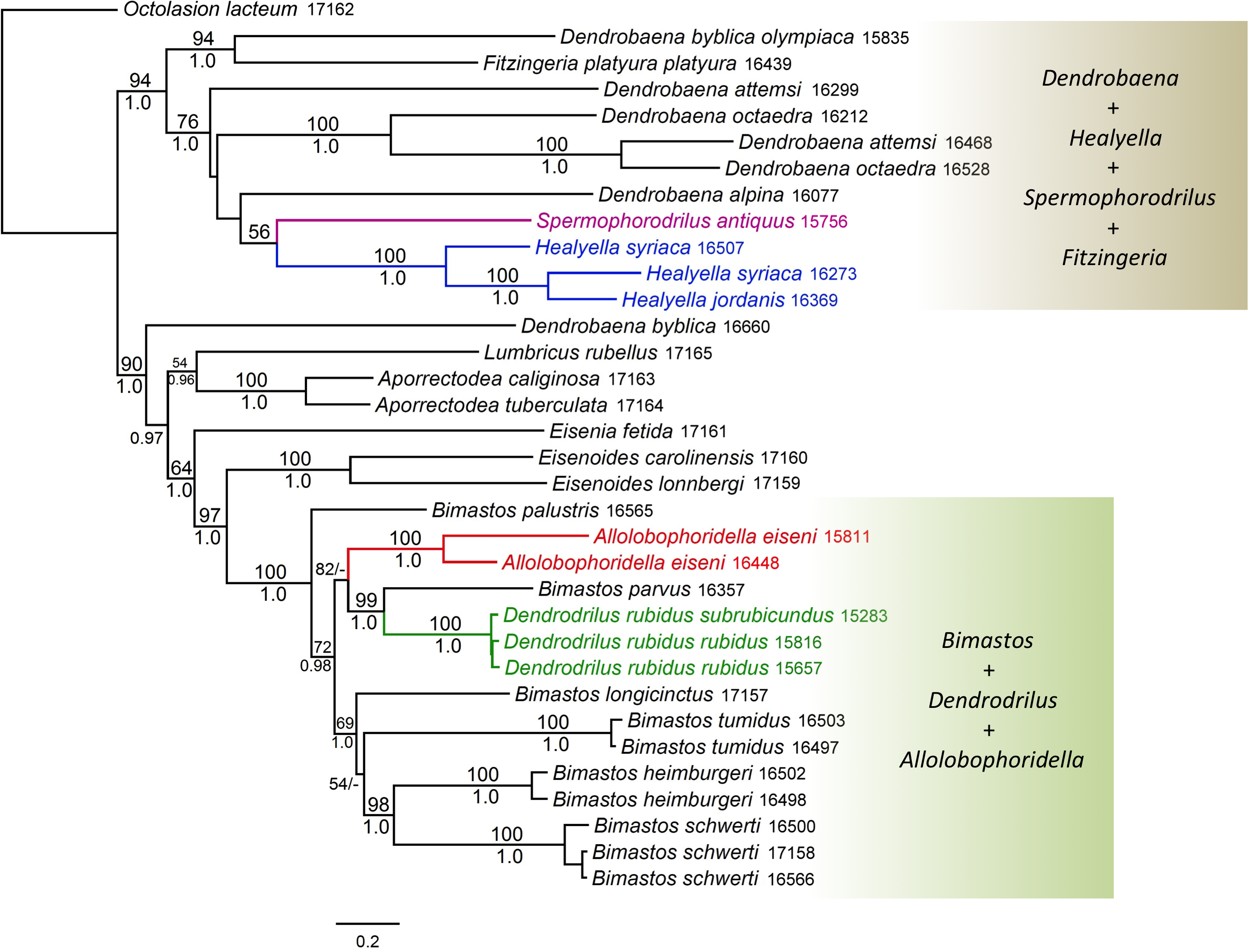
Molecular phylogeny of selected lumbricid worms
