= Eisenia =

Eisenia may refer to:

- Eisenia (alga), a brown alga genus
- Eisenia (annelid), an earthworm genus
