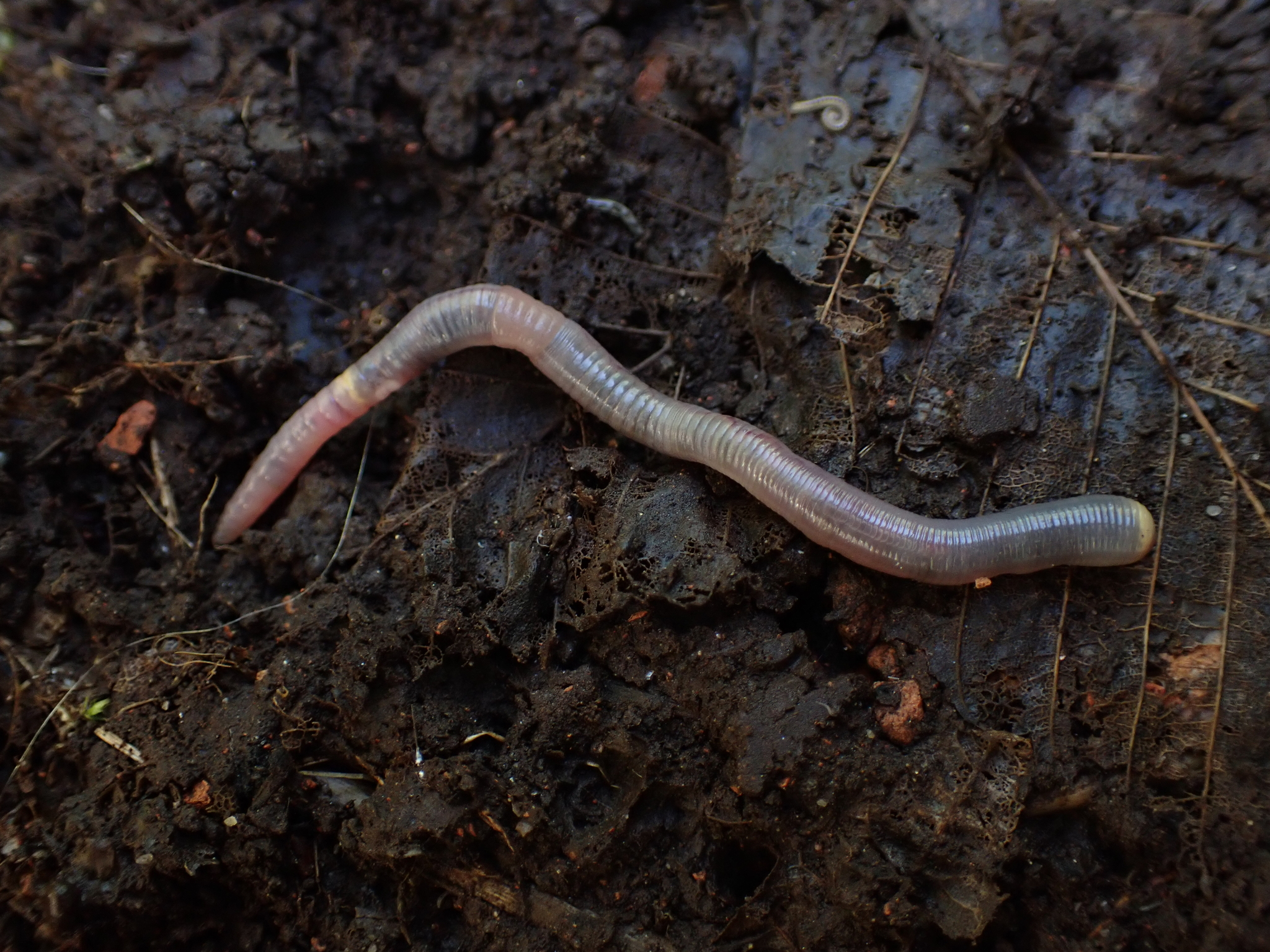

Scientific classification
- Kingdom: Animalia
- Phylum: Annelida
- Clade: Pleistoannelida
- Clade: Sedentaria
- Class: Clitellata
- Order: Opisthopora
- Family: Lumbricidae
- Genus: Octolasion
- Species: O. cyaneum

Binomial name
- Octolasion cyaneum (Savigny, 1826)

Synonyms
- List: Allolobophora cyanea (Savigny in Cuvier, 1826); Enterion cyaneum Savigny in Cuvier, 1826; Lumbricus cyaneus (Savigny in Cuvier, 1826); Octolasium cyaneum (Savigny in Cuvier, 1826); Octolasium cyaneum Maksimova & Mukhin, 2015; Octolasion cyaneum var. armoricum Bouche, 1972; Octolasium cyaneum var. armoricum Bouché, 1972; Helodrilus kempi Stephenson, 1922; Octolasium cyaneum Michaelsen, 1900; Allolobophora cyanea profuga Protz, 1895; Allolobophora cyanea studiosa Michaelsen, 1890; Allolobophora studiosa Michaelsen, 1890; Allolobophora cyanea profuga Rosa, 1884; Allolobophora cyanea stagnalis; Lumbricus alyattes Kinberg, 1866; Lumbricus stagnalis Hoffmeister, 1845; Lumbricus stagnilis Hoffmeister, 1845

= Octolasion cyaneum =

Species of worm

Octolasion cyaneum, known commonly as the blue-grey earthworm or steel-blue worm, is a species of earthworm in the genus Octolasion. It is one of the most widespread lumbricids, and can be found on every continent.

== Taxonomy ==
Octolasion cyaneum is a species of earthworm in the genus Octolasion and the family Lumbricidae.

== Habitat ==
O. cyaneum is entirely endogeic (lives strictly underground), and often found in waterlogged soil. It, along with the rest of the Octolasion genus, is believed to be native to Europe. It is highly invasive, and often outcompetes native worms thanks to its tolerance for adverse soil conditions, preference for human-made grasslands, and it's strict parthenogenic reproductive cycle.

== Appearance ==
O. cyaneum is typically blue, grey or white in colouration, with the exception of the last segment of its tail, which is usually yellow. The body is largely cylindrical, save for the posterior where it becomes octagonal. Length ranges from 65-140mm, with a diameter of 6-8mm. Segment number ranges from 100-160.

O. cyaneum is very visually similar to O. lacteum, but can be differentiated by the position of the clitellum (30-35) and the position of the tuberculata pubertatis (31-34). The prostomium is epilobic. In most Lumbricidae species, the first dorsal pore is usually in the furrow between segments 5/6. In O. cyaneum, it's on segments 9/11, 10/11 and 11/12, between setal lines. The clitellum (segments 29-34, 35) is usually beige or yellow in colour and saddle shaped. The setae are small, paired closely together in the anterior portion and widely in the posterior portion. The setae of segments 10, 18, 19, 20, and 21 are usually related to the swelling of the genitals. On the 15th segment between setal lines bc, male pores are paired. From segments 9-12 there are 4 pairs of seminal vesicles. Two pairs (9/10/11) of spermathecal pore openings between setal lines cd. Spermatheca are always empty. Anterior septa slightly thickened, 7/8—-12, 13.

== Life cycle ==
O. cyaneum is obligatorily parthenogenetic. Parthenogenesis (asexual reproduction) is common in this genus, and can result in genetically identical individuals born from small populations consisting of only a few worms. In the wild, O. cyaneum typically produces only one hatchling (singleton) per cocoon. However, in laboratory conditions a cocoon producing two hatchlings is more common, with 20% of cocoons producing twins.

In lab conditions, sexual maturity in singletons was achieved in 24-28 weeks, incubated at 15ºC. This time could be reduced by culturing the worms at a slightly higher temperature, and/or providing more food. For example, full sexual maturity was recorded in 17-18 weeks at 20ºC.
