= Reynoldsia =

Reynoldsia may refer to:

- Reynoldsia (plant), an obsolete genus of plants
- Reynoldsia (fly), a genus of flies in the tribe Coenosiini
- Reynoldsia (annelid), or Norealidys, a genus of earthworms
