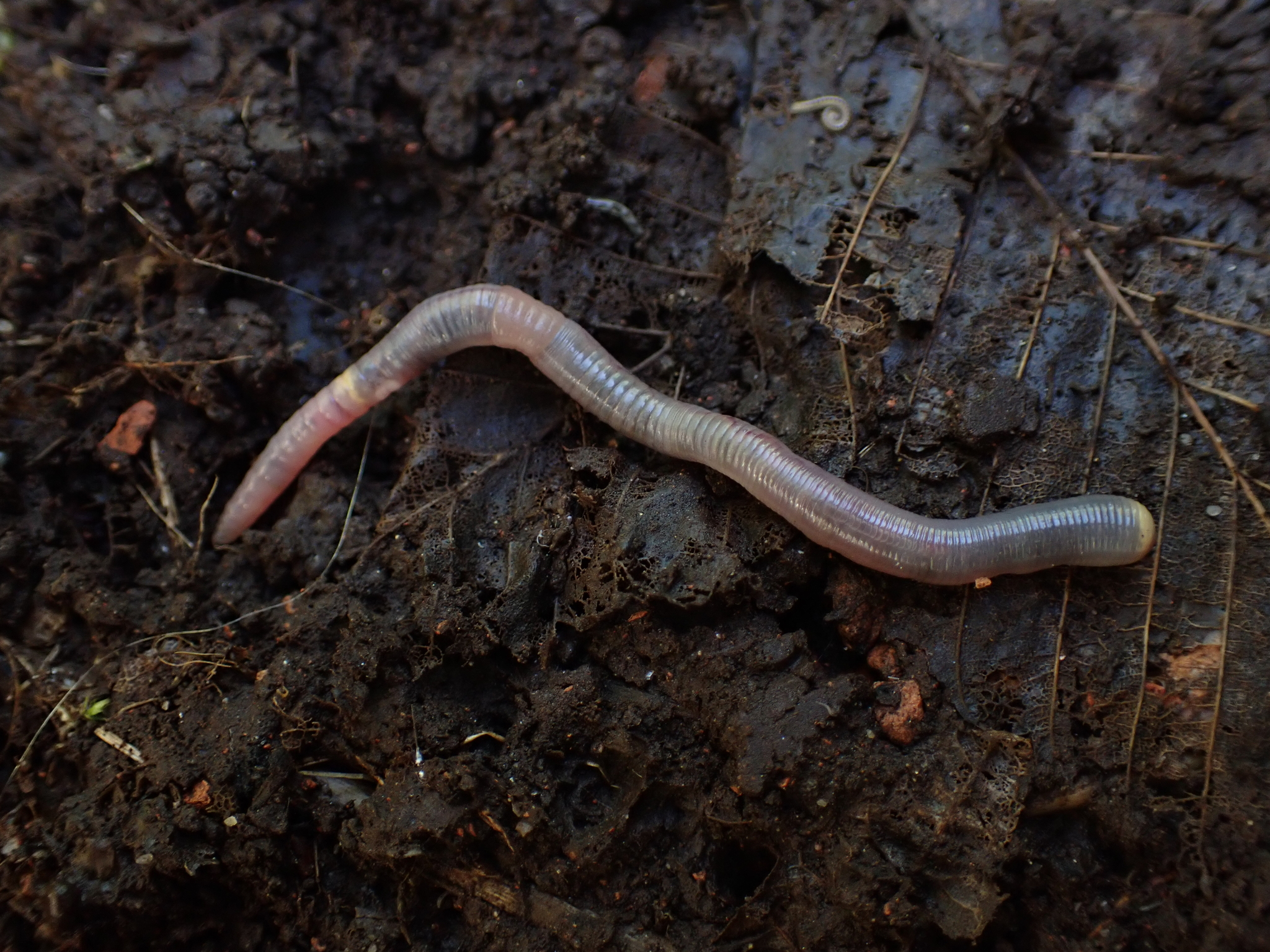
- Octolasion cyaneum

Scientific classification
- Kingdom: Animalia
- Phylum: Annelida
- Clade: Pleistoannelida
- Clade: Sedentaria
- Class: Clitellata
- Order: Opisthopora
- Family: Lumbricidae
- Genus: Octolasion; Örley, 1885

= Octolasion =

Genus of annelid worms

Octolasion, also known as field worms, is a genus of annelids belonging to the family Lumbricidae. Its name comes from the Greek words for 'eight' and 'hairy', named after its 8 longitudinal rows of setae. The positioning of these setae also gives its body an octagonal appearance when viewed posteriorly.

The species of this genus are found in Europe and Northern America. As of 2026, it has over 3,700 observations on iNaturalist.

Species:

- Octolasion lacteovicinum Sicsi, 1968
- Octolasion montanum Örley, 1885
- Octolasion tyrtaeum Savigny, 1826
- Octolasion lacteum Örley, 1881
- Octolasion cyaneum Savigny, 1826
