= Eisenoides lonnbergi =

Scientific classification
- Kingdom: Animalia
- Phylum: Annelida
- Clade: Pleistoannelida
- Clade: Sedentaria
- Class: Clitellata
- Order: Opisthopora
- Family: Lumbricidae
- Genus: Eisenoides
- Species: E. lonnbergi

Binomial name
- Eisenoides lonnbergi (Michaelsen, 1894)

Species of earthworm

Eisenoides lonnbergi is a species of earthworm native to North America that bioaccumulates a high amount of lead in its body from soil it consumes. This is anomalous as lead is usually immobile in soil and does not bioaccumulates up trophic levels compared to the amount of bioaccumulation seen in E. lonnbergi the general rule is that lead concentration in plants and animals is usually lower than in the soil. This might be due to the low calcium and high acidity in the soils at the collection sites in the Maryland Patuxent Wildlife Refuge area where the worms lived. External image. This species of earthworm is usually found in wetland sites such as bogs where they are recorded to be the only earthworms present, and seems to either have an affinity for highly acidic soils or an edaphic affinity or endemism towards highly acidic wet soils that lets it survive where no competition can occur against it. It is threatened by the invasive earthworms in areas that are not as acidic. The loss of wetlands in the northeast is also an example of habitat loss affecting their range. Including the wetlands of Upstate New York.
