= Bacopa crenata =

Scientific classification
- Kingdom: Plantae
- Clade: Tracheophytes
- Clade: Angiosperms
- Clade: Eudicots
- Clade: Asterids
- Order: Lamiales
- Family: Plantaginaceae
- Genus: Bacopa
- Species: B. crenata

Binomial name
- Bacopa crenata (P.Beauv.) Hepper

Synonyms
- Bacopa calycina (Benth.) Engl. ex De Wild.; Erinus africanus Pers.; Herpestis calycina Pennell; Herpestis crenata P. Beauv; Herpestis thonnginii Benth.; Moniera calycina (Benth.) Hiern

Species of flowering plant

Bacopa crenata, the waterhyssop, brahmi, or moneywort, is a perennial or annual medicinal herb indigenous to tropical Africa and Madagascar.

== Description ==
Bacopa crenata is a non-aromatic herb, growing up to 40 cm (16 in) in height. Its leaves are opposite, oblong, slightly serrated on their margin, and 1.4–1.5 cm (0.55–0.59 in) thick. Its leaves are also lanceolate to ovate and are arranged oppositely (opposite deccusate) on the stem. Its flowers are small, actinomorphic, and range from white to blue or purple, with four to five petals. Its ability to grow in water makes it a popular aquarium plant.

== Habitat and ecology ==
Bacopa crenata grows in marshy areas throughout West Africa, Angola, Madagascar, Kenya, and Tanzania.

== Uses ==
The leaves of Bacopa crenata are used in Africa to treat conjunctivitus and headaches, and to heal wounds.
