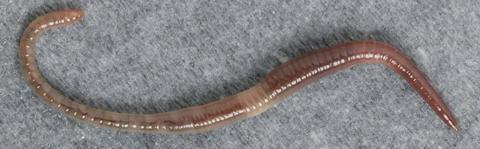
- Dendrobaena octaedra

Scientific classification
- Kingdom: Animalia
- Phylum: Annelida
- Clade: Pleistoannelida
- Clade: Sedentaria
- Class: Clitellata
- Order: Opisthopora
- Family: Lumbricidae
- Genus: Dendrobaena; Eisen, 1873

= Dendrobaena =

Genus of annelid worms

Dendrobaena is a genus of annelids belonging to the family Lumbricidae.

The genus has cosmopolitan distribution.

== Species ==
Species:

- Dendrobaena alpina (Rosa, 1884)
- Dendrobaena apora Qiu & Bouché, 1998
- Dendrobaena attemsi (Michaelsen, 1903)
- Dendrobaena auriculifera Zicsi, 1969
- Dendrobaena baksanensis Pĭzl, 1984
- Dendrobaena balcanica (Cernosvitov, 1931)
- Dendrobaena bogdanowii Kulagin, 1889
- Dendrobaena bokakotorensis Šapkarev, 1975
- Dendrobaena boneiensis (Michaelsen, 1910)
- Dendrobaena bosniaca Mršić, 1988
- Dendrobaena bruna Omodeo & Rota, 1989
- Dendrobaena burgosana Qiu & Bouché, 1998
- Dendrobaena byblica (Rosa, 1898)
- Dendrobaena caucasica Kulagin, 1889
- Dendrobaena cevdeti Szederjesi, Pavlíček, Coşkun & Csuzdi, 2014
- Dendrobaena clujensis Pop, 1938
- Dendrobaena cognettii Michaelsen, 1903
- Dendrobaena colloquia Bouche, 1973
- Dendrobaena durmitorensis Mršić, 1988
- Dendrobaena epirotica Zicsi & Michalis, 1993
- Dendrobaena faucium Michaelsen, 1910
- Dendrobaena franzi Zicsi, 1965
- Dendrobaena fridericae Omodeo & Rota, 1989
- Dendrobaena ganglbaueri (Rosa, 1894)
- Dendrobaena grmecensis Mršić, 1991
- Dendrobaena hamzalensis Mršić, 1991
- Dendrobaena hauseri Zicsi, 1973
- Dendrobaena hortensis (Michaelsen, 1890)
- Dendrobaena hrabei (Cernosvitov, 1934)
- Dendrobaena hurcanica Kvavadze & Nikolaishvili, 1980
- Dendrobaena hypogea Malevics, 1947
- Dendrobaena hyrcanica Kvavadze & Nikolaishvili, 1980
- Dendrobaena ilievae Kvavadze & Miloikova, 1993
- Dendrobaena illyricus (Cognetti de Martiis, 1906)
- Dendrobaena imeretiana Kvavadze, 1992
- Dendrobaena jahorensis Mršić, 1991
- Dendrobaena jastrebensis Mršić & Šapkarev, 1987
- Dendrobaena jeanneli Pop, 1948
- Dendrobaena juliana Omodeo, 1954
- Dendrobaena karacadagi Szederjesi, Pavlíček & Csuzdi, 2019
- Dendrobaena kelassuriensis Kvavadze, 1985
- Dendrobaena kervillei (Michaelsen, 1910)
- Dendrobaena kozuvensis Karaman, 1972
- Dendrobaena kozuvensis Sapkarev, 1971
- Dendrobaena kurashvilii Kavaadze, 1971
- Dendrobaena loebli Zicsi, 1985
- Dendrobaena lumbricoides Bretscher, 1901
- Dendrobaena luraensis Szederjesi & Csuzdi, 2012
- Dendrobaena lusitana Graff, 1957
- Dendrobaena macedonica Mršić, 1991
- Dendrobaena mahnerti Zicsi, 1974
- Dendrobaena mahunkai Csuzdi, Pavlíček & Misirlioğlu, 2007
- Dendrobaena mamissonica Kvavadze, 1984
- Dendrobaena manherti Zicsi, 1974
- Dendrobaena mariupolienis Wyssotzky, 1898
- Dendrobaena mariupoliensis
- Dendrobaena michalisi Karaman, 1972
- Dendrobaena monspessulana Qiu & Bouché, 1998
- Dendrobaena montenegrina Karaman, 1972
- Dendrobaena montenegrina Mršić, 1988
- Dendrobaena montenigrina Karaman, 1972
- Dendrobaena mrazeki (Cernosvitov, 1935)
- Dendrobaena mrsici Qiu & Bouche, 1998
- Dendrobaena nasonowii Kulagin, 1889
- Dendrobaena nassonovi Kulagin, 1889
- Dendrobaena negevis Csuzdi & Pavlíček, 1999
- Dendrobaena nevoi Csuzdi & Pavlíček, 1999
- Dendrobaena nicaensis Vedovini, 1970
- Dendrobaena nivalis Omodeo & Rota, 1989
- Dendrobaena ochridana Sapkarev, 1977
- Dendrobaena octaedra (Savigny, 1826)
- Dendrobaena oltenica (Pop, 1938)
- Dendrobaena omodeoi Csuzdi, Pavlíček & Misirlioğlu, 2007
- Dendrobaena orientalis Černosvitov, 1940
- Dendrobaena orientaloides Zicsi, 1985
- Dendrobaena osellai Zicsi, 1970
- Dendrobaena pantaleonis (Chinaglia, 1913)
- Dendrobaena papukiana Mršić, 1987
- Dendrobaena parabyblica Perel, 1972
- Dendrobaena pavliceki Szederjesi & Csuzdi, 2018
- Dendrobaena pentheri (Rosa, 1905)
- Dendrobaena persimilis Omodeo & Rota, 1989
- Dendrobaena perula Omodeo & Rota, 1989
- Dendrobaena pindonensis Zicsi & Michalis, 1993
- Dendrobaena platyura
- Dendrobaena proandra Omodeo & Rota, 1989
- Dendrobaena pseudohortensis Šapkarev, 1977
- Dendrobaena pseudorrosea Moreno, Jesus & Cosín, 1982
- Dendrobaena ressli Zicsi, 1973
- Dendrobaena retrosella Szederjesi & Csuzdi, 2012
- Dendrobaena riparia Bretscher, 1901
- Dendrobaena rivulicola Chandebois, 1958
- Dendrobaena rothschildae Csuzdi & Pavlíček, 1999
- Dendrobaena ruffoi Zicsi, 1970
- Dendrobaena samarigera (Rosa, 1893)
- Dendrobaena sasensis Sapkarev, 1983
- Dendrobaena schmidti (Michaelsen, 1907)
- Dendrobaena semitica (Rosa, 1893)
- Dendrobaena serbica Karaman, 1973
- Dendrobaena sketi Karaman, 1972
- Dendrobaena slovenica Mršić, 1991
- Dendrobaena steineri Zicsi, 1994
- Dendrobaena succincta (Rosa, 1905)
- Dendrobaena succinta (Rosa, 1905)
- Dendrobaena swanetiana Kvavadze, 1992
- Dendrobaena szalokii Szederjesi, Pavlíček, Coşkun & Csuzdi, 2014
- Dendrobaena taurica Szederjesi & Csuzdi, 2018
- Dendrobaena vejdovskyi (Cernosvitov, 1935)
- Dendrobaena velkhovrhia Mršić, 1988
- Dendrobaena velkovrhi Mrsic, 1988
- Dendrobaena veneta (Rosa, 1886)
- Dendrobaena verihemiandra Kvavadze, Patsiashvili & Suladze, 1989
- Dendrobaena vraicensis Mršić, 1991
- Dendrobaena vranicensis Mrsic, 1991
- Dendrobaena zicsi Karaman, 1973
