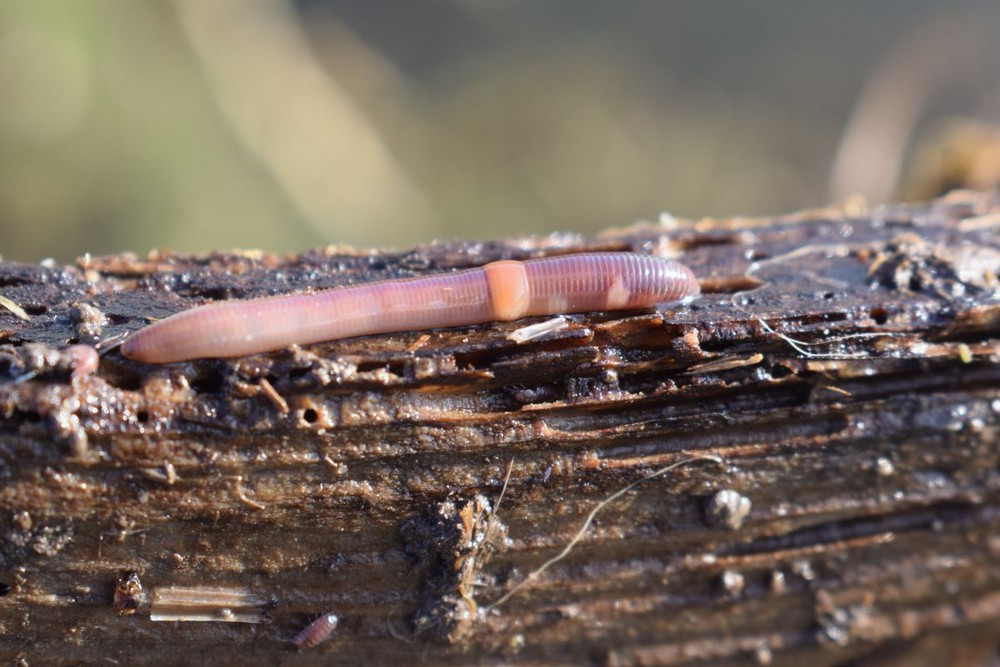
- Satchellius mammalis

Scientific classification
- Domain: Eukaryota
- Kingdom: Animalia
- Phylum: Annelida
- Clade: Pleistoannelida
- Clade: Sedentaria
- Class: Clitellata
- Order: Opisthopora
- Family: Lumbricidae
- Genus: Satchellius; Gates, 1975

= Satchellius =

Genus of earthworms within the family Lumbricidae

Satchellius is a genus of earthworms within the family Lumbricidae. Members of this genus are found in the European regions of the British Isles, the northern coast of Western Europe, and Scandinavia.

== Species ==
- Satchellius alvaradoi (Moreno, Jesus & Diaz Cosin, 1982)
- Satchellius madeirensis (Michaelsen, 1891)
- Satchellius mammalis (Savigny in Cuvier, 1826)
