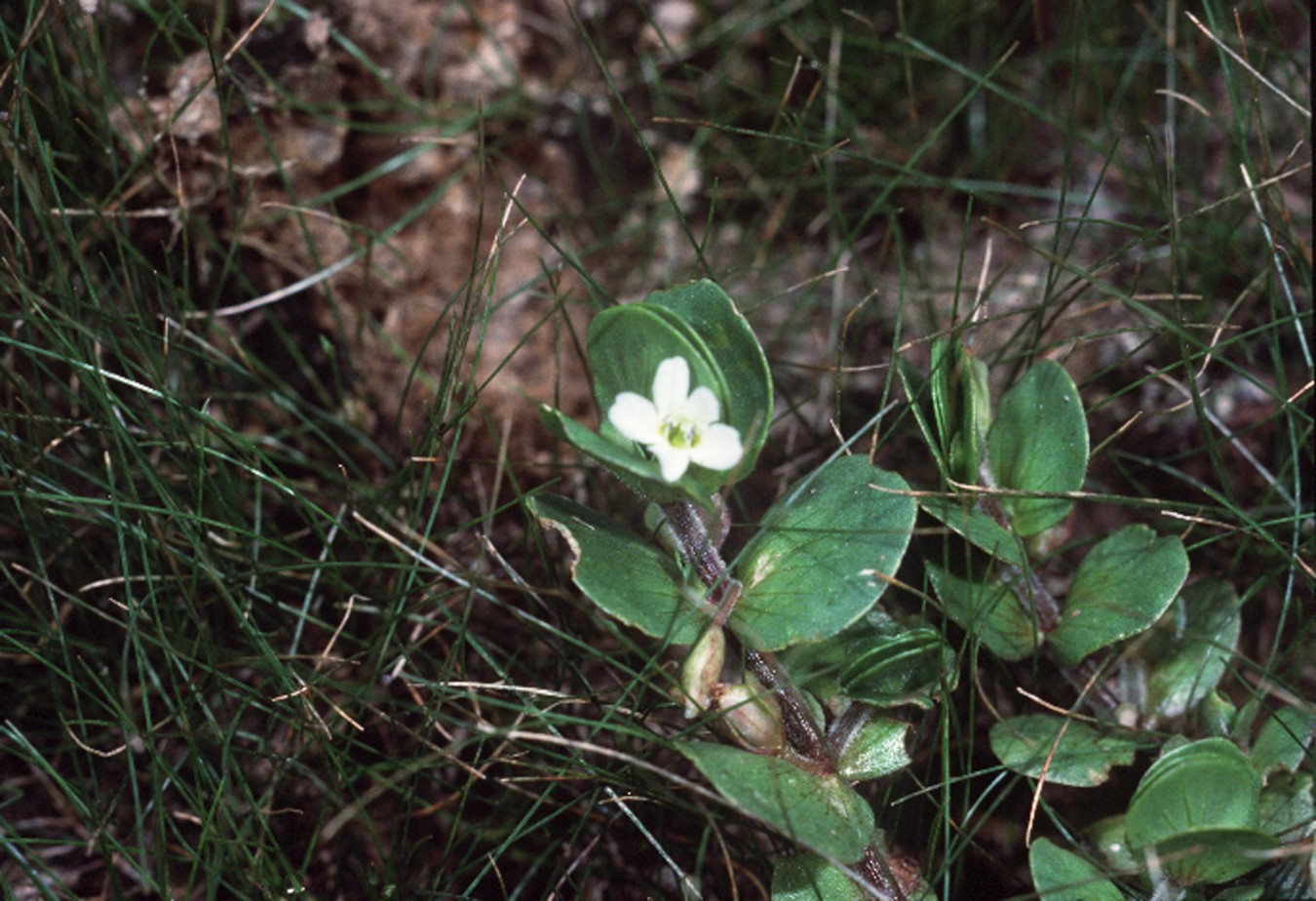

Conservation status
- Secure (NatureServe)

Scientific classification
- Kingdom: Plantae
- Clade: Embryophytes
- Clade: Tracheophytes
- Clade: Spermatophytes
- Clade: Angiosperms
- Clade: Eudicots
- Clade: Asterids
- Order: Lamiales
- Family: Plantaginaceae
- Genus: Bacopa
- Species: B. rotundifolia

Binomial name
- Bacopa rotundifolia (Michx.) Wettst.

Synonyms
- Bramia rotundifolia; Herpestis rotundifolia; Hydranthelium rotundifolium; Macuillamia rotundifolia; Moniera rotundifolia; Ranapalus rotundifolius

= Bacopa rotundifolia =

Aquatic plant species in the veronica family

Bacopa rotundifolia is a species of water hyssop known as the disk water hyssop or round-leafed water hyssop, due to the shape of its leaves. This is an aquatic plant native to water bodies of the central United States and well known in other areas as an invasive weed of waterways. The round leaves are 1 to 3 centimeters wide and each has six longitudinal veins. The plant produces yellow-throated white flowers. The plant is in bloom during the fall, its fruit/seed abundance is medium and its seed spread rate is slow. The plant has no commercial use.

== Taxonomy ==
Bacopa rotundifolia was scientifically described in 1803 by André Michaux and named Moniera rotundifolia. It was moved to another genus five different times, but it was moved to Bacopa in 1891 by Richard Wettstein giving the species its accepted name. Together with its genus it is part of the family Plantaginaceae. It has 14 synonyms.

Table of Synonyms
Name	Year	Notes
Bacopa nobsiana H.Mason	1952	= het.
Bacopa obovata (Raf.) Fernald	1937	= het.
Bacopa simulans Fernald	1942	= het.
Bacopa tweediei (Benth.) Parodi	1930	= het.
Bramia rotundifolia (Michx.) Britton	1913	≡ hom.
Herpestis rotundifolia (Michx.) Pursh	1813	≡ hom.
Herpestis tweediei Benth.	1846	= het.
Hydranthelium obovatum (Raf.) Pennell	1935	= het.
Hydranthelium rotundifolium (Michx.) Pennell	1935	≡ hom.
Macuillamia obovata Raf.	1840	= het.
Macuillamia rotundifolia (Michx.) Raf.	1840	≡ hom.
Moniera rotundifolia Michx.	1803	≡ hom.
Moniera tweedyi Kuntze	1891	= het.
Ranapalus rotundifolius (Michx.) Pennell	1919	≡ hom.
Notes: ≡ homotypic synonym; = heterotypic synonym
