= Prosellodrilus amplisetosus =

Scientific classification
- Kingdom: Animalia
- Phylum: Annelida
- Clade: Pleistoannelida
- Clade: Sedentaria
- Class: Clitellata
- Order: Opisthopora
- Family: Lumbricidae
- Genus: Prosellodrilus
- Species: P. amplisetosus

Binomial name
- Prosellodrilus amplisetosus Bouché, 1972

Species of annelid

Prosellodrilus amplisetosus is a species of earthworm native to Aquitaine in south-western France; it has also been introduced to a site in County Louth, Ireland.
