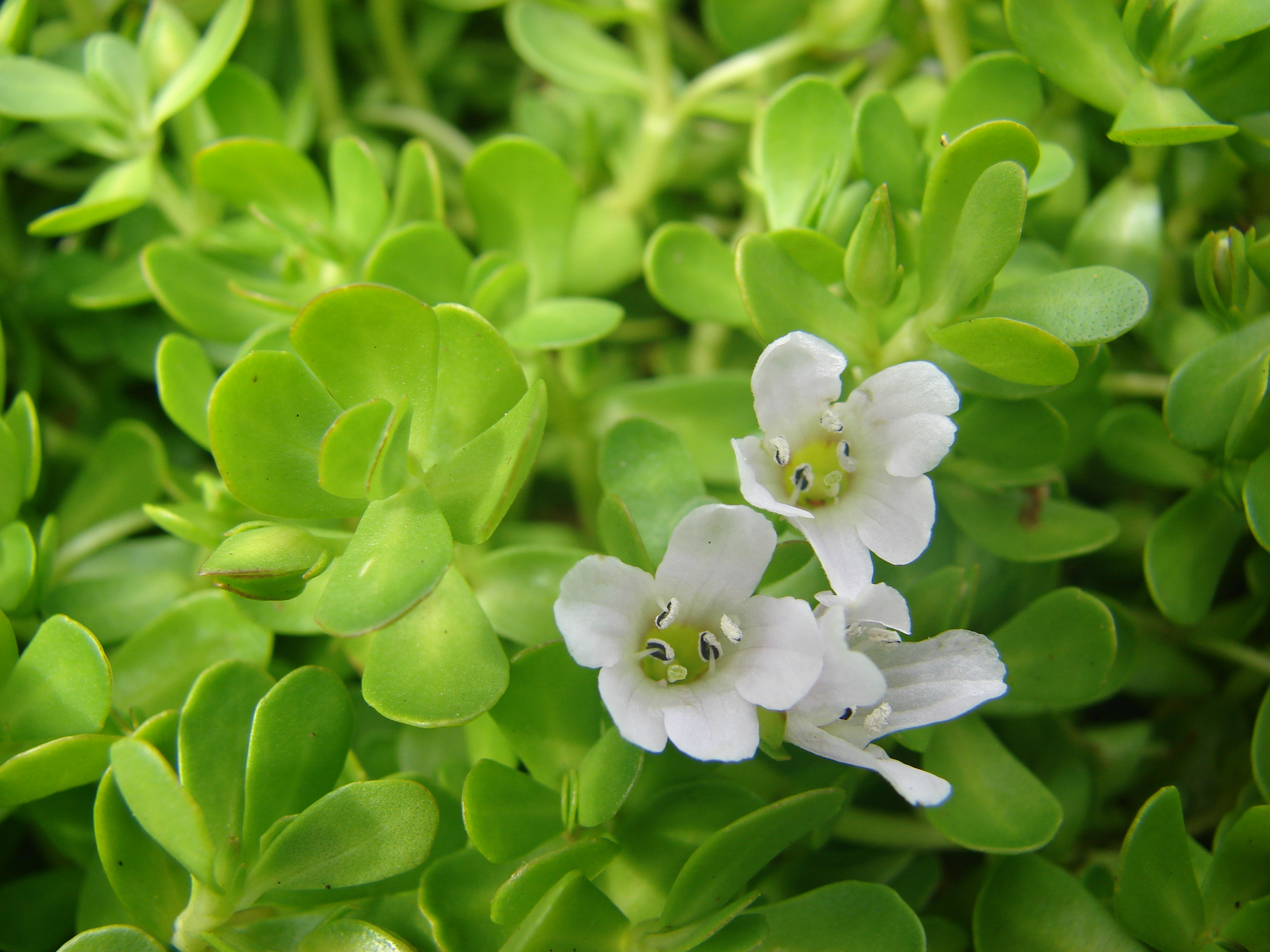
- Bacopa monnieri

Scientific classification
- Kingdom: Plantae
- Clade: Tracheophytes
- Clade: Angiosperms
- Clade: Eudicots
- Clade: Asterids
- Order: Lamiales
- Family: Plantaginaceae
- Tribe: Gratioleae
- Genus: Bacopa; Aubl. (1775), nom. cons.

Species
- 60; see text

Synonyms
- Allocalyx Cordem. (1895); Anisocalyx Hance (1853); Blanckia Neck. (1790), opus utique oppr.; Brami Adans. (1763); Bramia Lam. (1785); Caconapea Cham. in Linnaea 8: 28 (1833); Calytriplex Ruiz & Pav. (1794); Cardiolophus Griff. (1836); Conobea Aubl. (1775); Habershamia Raf. (1825); Heptas Meisn. (1840); Herpestis Gaertn. (1807); Hydranthelium Kunth (1825); Hydropyxis Raf. in Fl. Ludov.: 94 (1817); Hydrotrida Willd. ex Britton & A.Br. (1913); Macuillamia Raf. (1825); Moniera P.Browne (1756), nom. rej.; Maeviella Rossow (1983-1985 publ. 1985); Mella Vand. (1788); Monocardia Pennell (1919 publ. 1920); Naiadothrix Pennell (1920); Quinquelobus Benj. (1847); Ranapalus Kellogg (1877); Ranaria Cham. (1833); Septas Lour. (1790), nom. illeg.; Septilia Raf. (1838); Silvinula Pennell (1920); Sinobacopa D.Y.Hong (1987); Sphaerotheca Cham. & Schltdl. (1827)

= Bacopa =

Genus of aquatic plants

Bacopa is a genus of 60 aquatic plants belonging to the family Plantaginaceae. It is commonly known as waterhyssop (or water hyssop, though this is more misleading as Bacopa is not very closely related to hyssop but simply has a somewhat similar appearance).

== Description ==
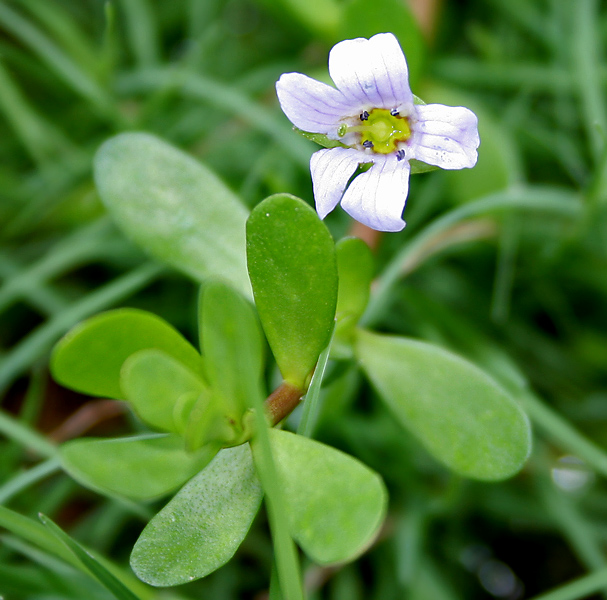
Bacopa monnieri in Hyderabad, India

They are annual or perennial, with decumbent or erect stems. The leaves are opposite or whorled, and sessile. The leaf blade is regular, round to linear, and the venation is palmate or pinnate. Its stems are hairy or smooth. The flowers are produced solitary or in pairs from leaf axils, usually radially symmetrical, with five sepals and five petals, and they are usually white, blue, or purple. Dispersal and propagation is by seeds and stem fragments. Crushed leaves have a distinctive 'lemon' scent.

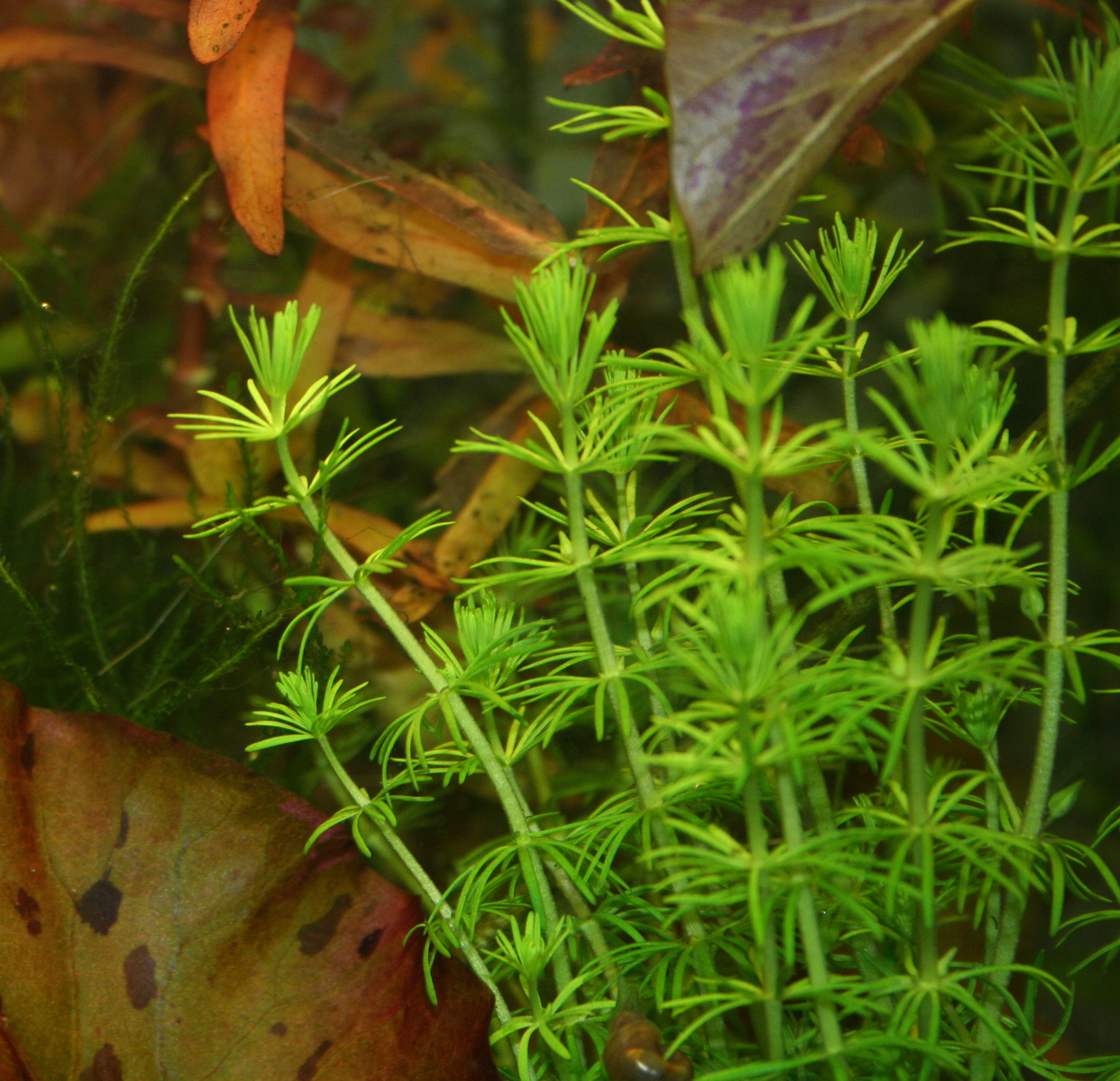
Bacopa myriophylloides

== Habitat and range ==
Bacopa species are found in tropical and subtropical regions of the world, particularly the Americas. A few are regarded as weeds and excess stock should not be dumped in warmer regions. Most grow in moist amphibious conditions, though some like B. myriophylloides seem to be wholly aquatic.

== Uses ==
Bacopa monnieri is used in Ayurvedic medicine. Preliminary clinical research found that the herb may improve cognition.

== Cultivation ==
Some of these species are commonly used in freshwater aquariums and ponds in warmer climates. Most are easy to grow and will tolerate a wide range of conditions. B. monnieri will tolerate brackish water up to 15 ppt, due to specialized adaptations that enable it to survive in saline environments. Algal infestation can be a problem in brighter lighting conditions.

== Species ==
60 species are accepted.

- Bacopa albida (Pennell) Standl.
- Bacopa angulata (Benth.) Loefgr. & Edwall
- Bacopa aquatica Aubl.
- Bacopa arenaria (J.A.Schmidt) Loefgr. & Edwall
- Bacopa aubletiana Scatigna
- Bacopa australis V.C.Souza
- Bacopa axillaris (Benth.) Standl.
- Bacopa bacopoides (Benth.) Pulle
- Bacopa beccabunga (Griseb.) B.L.Rob.
- Bacopa bracteolata Standl.
- Bacopa braunii (Ernst) Pennell
- Bacopa callitrichoides (Kunth) Pennell
- Bacopa caroliniana (Walter) B.L.Rob. – lemon bacopa, blue water hyssop, giant bacopa
- Bacopa cochlearia (Huber) L.B.Sm.
- Bacopa congesta Chodat & Hassl.
- Bacopa connata (Pennell) Pennell
- Bacopa crenata (P.Beauv.) Hepper
- Bacopa decumbens (Fernald) F.N.Williams
- Bacopa depressa (Benth.) Loefgr. & Edwall
- Bacopa dubia Chodat & Hassl.
- Bacopa egensis (Poepp.) Pennell
- Bacopa eisenii (Kellogg) Pennell – Gila River waterhyssop
- Bacopa floribunda (R.Br.) Wettst.
- Bacopa gracilis (Benth.) Loefgr. & Edwall
- Bacopa gratioloides (Cham.) Chodat
- Bacopa hamiltoniana (Benth.) Wettst.
- Bacopa humifusa (Griseb.) B.L.Rob.
- Bacopa imbricata (Benth.) Pennell
- Bacopa innominata (G.Maza) Alain – tropical waterhyssop
- Bacopa lacertosa Standl.
- Bacopa lanigera (Cham. & Schltdl.) Wettst.
- Bacopa laxiflora (Benth.) Edwall
- Bacopa lecomtei Bonati
- Bacopa lisowskiana Mielcarek
- Bacopa longipes (Pennell) Standl.
- Bacopa madagascariensis (Benth.) Pennell
- Bacopa micromonnieria (Griseb.) B.L.Rob.
- Bacopa minuta Borhidi & O.Muñiz
- Bacopa monnieri (L.) Wettst. – water hyssop, moneywort, herb of grace
- Bacopa monnierioides (Cham.) B.L.Rob.
- Bacopa myriophylloides (Benth.) Wettst.
- Bacopa neuwiedii Scatigna
- Bacopa occultans (Hiern) Hutch. & Dalziel
- Bacopa oxycalyx Alain
- Bacopa paraguariensis (S.Moore) Hassl.
- Bacopa pennellii G.M.Barroso & Ichaso
- Bacopa punctata Engl.
- Bacopa repens (Sw.) Wettst.
- Bacopa reptans (Benth.) Edwall
- Bacopa rotundifolia (Michx.) Wettst. – disc waterhyssop
- Bacopa salzmannii (Benth.) Edwall
- Bacopa scabra (Benth.) Descole & Borsini
- Bacopa scoparioides (Cham. & Schltdl.) Scatigna
- Bacopa semiserrata (Schrank) B.L.Rob.
- Bacopa serpyllifolia (Benth.) Pennell
- Bacopa sessiliflora (Benth.) Edwall
- Bacopa stemodioides (Pennell) Pennell
- Bacopa stricta (Schrad.) Wettst. ex Edwall – yerba de culebra
- Bacopa valerii Standl. & L.O.Williams
- Bacopa verticillata (Pennell & Gleason) Pennell

== See also ==
- Chaenostoma cordatum syn. Sutera cordata, a plant also known by the obsolete name Bacopa.
