= Prosellodrilus =

Scientific classification
- Kingdom: Animalia
- Phylum: Annelida
- Clade: Pleistoannelida
- Clade: Sedentaria
- Class: Clitellata
- Order: Opisthopora
- Family: Lumbricidae
- Genus: Prosellodrilus; Bouché, 1972

Genus of annelid worms

Prosellodrilus is a genus of annelids belonging to the family Lumbricidae.

The species of this genus are found in Europe.

Species:

- Prosellodrilus alatus Bouché, 1972
- Prosellodrilus albus Zicsi & Csuzdi, 1999
- Prosellodrilus amplisetosus Bouché, 1972
- Prosellodrilus arenicola Qiu & Bouché, 1998
