= Eophila eti =

Scientific classification
- Domain: Eukaryota
- Kingdom: Animalia
- Phylum: Annelida
- Clade: Pleistoannelida
- Clade: Sedentaria
- Class: Clitellata
- Order: Opisthopora
- Family: Lumbricidae
- Genus: Eophila
- Species: E. eti

Binomial name
- Eophila eti Blakemore, 2008

Species of annelid worms

Eophila eti is a worm found in Tasmania a member of the Lumbricidae family. It is commonly called the mystery worm. The holotype specimen was found in 2008 in northern Tasmania, Dalgarth Forest Reserve.

Based on its name and description as an enigma it might later be moved taxonomically after further genetics work is published.

Eophila eti, Blakemore, R.J. 2008. It was added as part of group Oligochaeta on June 15, 2011.
