= Eiseniella =

Scientific classification
- Kingdom: Animalia
- Phylum: Annelida
- Clade: Pleistoannelida
- Clade: Sedentaria
- Class: Clitellata
- Order: Opisthopora
- Family: Lumbricidae
- Genus: Eiseniella; W. Michaelsen, 1900

Genus of annelid worms

Eiseniella is a genus of worms in the Lumbricidae. The genus was described in 1900 by W. Michaelsen. It has cosmopolitan distribution. Two species are described:

- E. neapolitana
- E. tetraedra
