= Eiseniona =

Scientific classification
- Domain: Eukaryota
- Kingdom: Animalia
- Phylum: Annelida
- Clade: Pleistoannelida
- Clade: Sedentaria
- Class: Clitellata
- Order: Opisthopora
- Family: Lumbricidae
- Genus: Eiseniona; Omodeo, 1956

Genus of annelid worms

Eiseniona is a genus of annelids belonging to the family Lumbricidae.

Species:

- Eiseniona albolineata Cosín, Trigo & Mato, 1989
- Eiseniona carpetana Alvarez, 1970
- Eiseniona gabriellae Omodeo, 1984
- Eiseniona gerardoi Díaz Cosín, 2014
- Eiseniona gerardoi Omodeo, 1956
- Eiseniona oliveirai (Rosa, 1894)
- Eiseniona sineporis (Omodeo, 1952)
