= Norealidys =

Scientific classification
- Kingdom: Animalia
- Phylum: Annelida
- Clade: Pleistoannelida
- Clade: Sedentaria
- Class: Clitellata
- Order: Opisthopora
- Family: Lumbricidae
- Genus: Norealidys; Blakemore, 2008
- Species: N. andaluciana

Binomial name
- Norealidys andaluciana (Qiu & Bouche 1998)

Genus of Clitellata

Norealidys is a replacement name for preoccupied earthworm genus Reynoldsia - non Reynoldsia (Diptera : Muscidae) [nec botanical genus Reynoldsia of flowering plant family Araliaceae] - under ICZN (1999) as previously flagged. The genus is currently monotypic, with Norealidys andaluciana as the sole species.
