= Eisenia andrei =

Scientific classification
- Kingdom: Animalia
- Phylum: Annelida
- Clade: Pleistoannelida
- Clade: Sedentaria
- Class: Clitellata
- Order: Opisthopora
- Family: Lumbricidae
- Genus: Eisenia
- Species: E. andrei

Binomial name
- Eisenia andrei Bouché, 1972

Synonyms
- Eisenia fetida andrei

Species of annelid worm

Eisenia andrei is a close relative of the 'brandling' or 'tiger' worm Eisenia fetida. Like E. fetida, it is epigeic, i.e. it prefers to live in compost or leaf litter rather than mineral soils.

It can be distinguished from E. fetida as it is darker in colour, and the characteristic stripes are less pronounced. Although its status as a separate species was fully confirmed in the mid-1980s by molecular analyses (based on electrophoresis of protein isoforms), E. andrei is still often misidentified and confused with E. fetida. The muscles of the Eisenia andrei embryos appear in groups of at least two distinct muscles that cross the ventral midline and initially reach towards the lateral side of the embryo. The two species are very similar morphologically in terms of their needs, general reproductive performances, and life cycles, however, E. andrei has a growth rate and cocoon production at a quicker rate than E. fetida due to its more advanced substrate nature.
