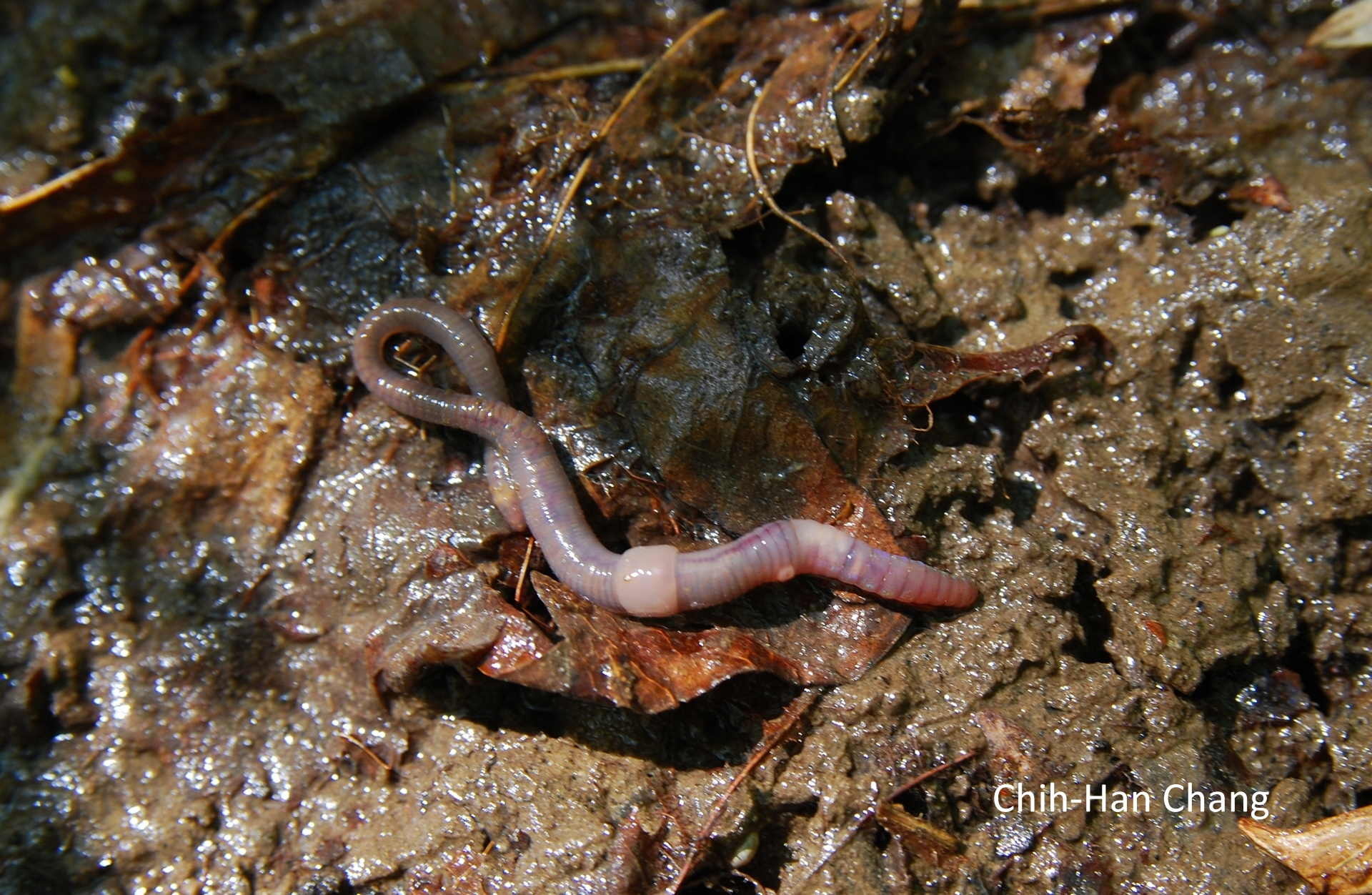
- A picture of an O.Lacteum in its natural moist environment

Scientific classification
- Kingdom: Animalia
- Phylum: Annelida
- Clade: Pleistoannelida
- Clade: Sedentaria
- Class: Clitellata
- Order: Opisthopora
- Family: Lumbricidae
- Genus: Octolasion
- Species: O. lacteum

Binomial name
- Octolasion lacteum Örley, 1885

= Octolasion lacteum =

Species of worm

Octolasion lacteum is a species of earthworm of the genus Octolasion. In New Zealand it has been found in West Coast soils and in Canterbury. They are found in mostly moist areas deep under the soil as they feed in the nutrients within the soil. Unlike other worm species, these are known to survive in acidic soil as well as soil that is not as organic compared to other places. They provide some important roles in the ecosystem as well as threats to other species as well. After a drought, they help the soil get more organic by adding more carbon dioxide in the soil and the waste from the O. lacteum also provides nutrients for the soil. In another case, they can also be invasive in a way that they suck up carbon in the soil which means plants have less causing a disruption to the food web. Lastly, they reproduce by cross parthogenic reproduction.

== Taxonomy ==
Octolasion lacteum is a species of earthworm in the genus Octolasion, family Lumbricidae. They were first in New Zealand in N.A. Martin's garden around the 1970s. The DNA found within the specific species is also found to be able to deal with high radiation exposure.

== Habitat ==
Mostly all O. lacteum live under soil in moist environments mainly. They are commonly found inside mould and muddy soil. They can be found in a broader range of environmental conditions unlike other worm species. They can be found in acidic soil with a pH of 4.7 as well as less organic soils with an organic matter of 7.3%. In some cases, they can also be found in an organic matter of between 4.3% and 5.5%. Also, they are found to compete with plants for resources. As they are known to eat a lot, plants suck up the nutrients available for them limiting the growth of the worms. In order for them to survive, the environment needs to be plant free in a moist muddy environment. They are also found to be able to survive in areas of high radiation exposure. Unlike other species of worms, O. lacteum lives deep under the soil feeding on soil nutrients rather than leaf litter.

== Ecology ==
Earthworms are ecologically important in restoring carbon levels in the soil after a drought. They also help increase mineral nitrogen in soil. Their waste products also restore other nutrients. In some instances, O. lacteum can become invasive and usurp all the carbon in the soil, starving local vegetation.

As tiny as they may be, they have an important role in which they help the ecosystem as well as humans. After a drought, they help the soil get better by increasing the rate of Carbon dioxide in the soil which is used by plants to grow. They also help increase mineral Nitrogen in soil which is essential for soil. This is important to humans in a way because with good quality of soil bring a better growth rate of plants and trees which are used daily by almost every human and animal in the planet. After depositing waste from their bodies, the waste product provides nutrients for the soil to be able to pass on to the next level on the food web. In some instances, Octolasion Lacteum can also be a threat to the environment. In some areas, they become invasive and suck up Carbon in the soil causing a loss for the trees and other plants growing in the area.

== Reproduction ==
Almost all species of worms have the same method of reproduction. In the family of Lumbricidae, reproduction occurs by cross parthenogenesis reproduction. Parthenogenesis reproduction is a type of asexual reproduction that was not require fertilization of the egg cell. This is a process of asexual reproduction that occurs by bipartioning, stolonisation, or budding. In males, the funnels are full of spermatozoa while spermathecae is full of spermatozoa as well. The most active time for reproduction is usually in the spring or in the autumn when the conditions are moist which makes it ideal for survival of the worms. Although all details of the sperm transfer is not known, it is observed that the clitellum tends to move backwards developing the seminal groves that connect the male pores to the tubercula pubertatis. After that, the spermatozoa flows through the seminal groves which then goes to the partners spermathecae pores.
