= Bacopa eisenii =

Conservation status
- Vulnerable (NatureServe)

Scientific classification
- Kingdom: Plantae
- Clade: Tracheophytes
- Clade: Angiosperms
- Clade: Eudicots
- Clade: Asterids
- Order: Lamiales
- Family: Plantaginaceae
- Genus: Bacopa
- Species: B. eisenii

Binomial name
- Bacopa eisenii (Kellogg) Pennell

Species of aquatic plant

Bacopa eisenii is a species of water hyssop known by the common name Gila River water hyssop. It is native to California and Nevada, where it grows in wet habitat such as rice paddies and muddy river banks. This aquatic plant has rounded or oval leaves 1 to 3 centimeters (0.39 to 1.18 in) long with several longitudinal veins. The flower appears on a stout pedicel; it is white with a bright golden throat. The fruit is a capsule containing many seeds.
