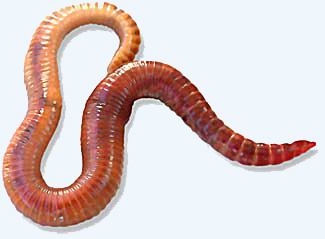

Scientific classification
- Kingdom: Animalia
- Phylum: Annelida
- Clade: Pleistoannelida
- Clade: Sedentaria
- Class: Clitellata
- Order: Opisthopora
- Family: Lumbricidae
- Genus: Eisenia
- Species: E. fetida

Binomial name
- Eisenia fetida (Savigny, 1826)

Synonyms
- Eisenia foetida (older spelling)

= Eisenia fetida =

Species of annelid worm

Eisenia fetida, known under various common names such as manure worm, redworm, brandling worm, panfish worm, trout worm, tiger worm, red wiggler worm, etc., is a species of earthworm adapted to decaying organic material. These worms thrive in rotting vegetation, compost, and manure. They are epigean, rarely found in soil. In this trait, they resemble Lumbricus rubellus.

The worm is reddish-brown in color, has small rings around its body, and has a yellowish tail. Groups of bristles (called setae) on each segment of the worm move in and out to grip nearby surfaces as it stretches and contracts its muscles to push itself forward or backward.

E. fetida worms are native to Europe, but have been introduced (both intentionally and unintentionally) to every other continent except Antarctica.

E. fetida also possesses a unique natural defense system in its coelomic fluid; cells called coelomocytes secrete a protein called lysenin, which is a pore-forming toxin, which is able to permeabilize and lyse invading cells. It is best at targeting foreign cells whose membranes contain significant amounts of sphingomyelin. (Lysenin is also toxic to organisms lacking sphingomyelin in their cell walls, including Bacillus megaterium, though the pathway is not understood).

== Uses ==
E. fetida is used for vermicomposting of both domestic and industrial organic waste. Vermicomposting septic systems have been used for decades and allow for decentralized on-site processing of blackwater using Eisenia fetida. Tiger worms are also being tested for use in a flushless toilet, currently being trialled in India, Uganda and Myanmar.

Red worm is widely used in fishing, being one of the most ideal baits for tench, bream, and roach.

== Odor ==
When roughly handled a redworm exudes a pungent liquid, thus the specific name fetida meaning "foul-smelling". This is presumably an antipredator adaptation.

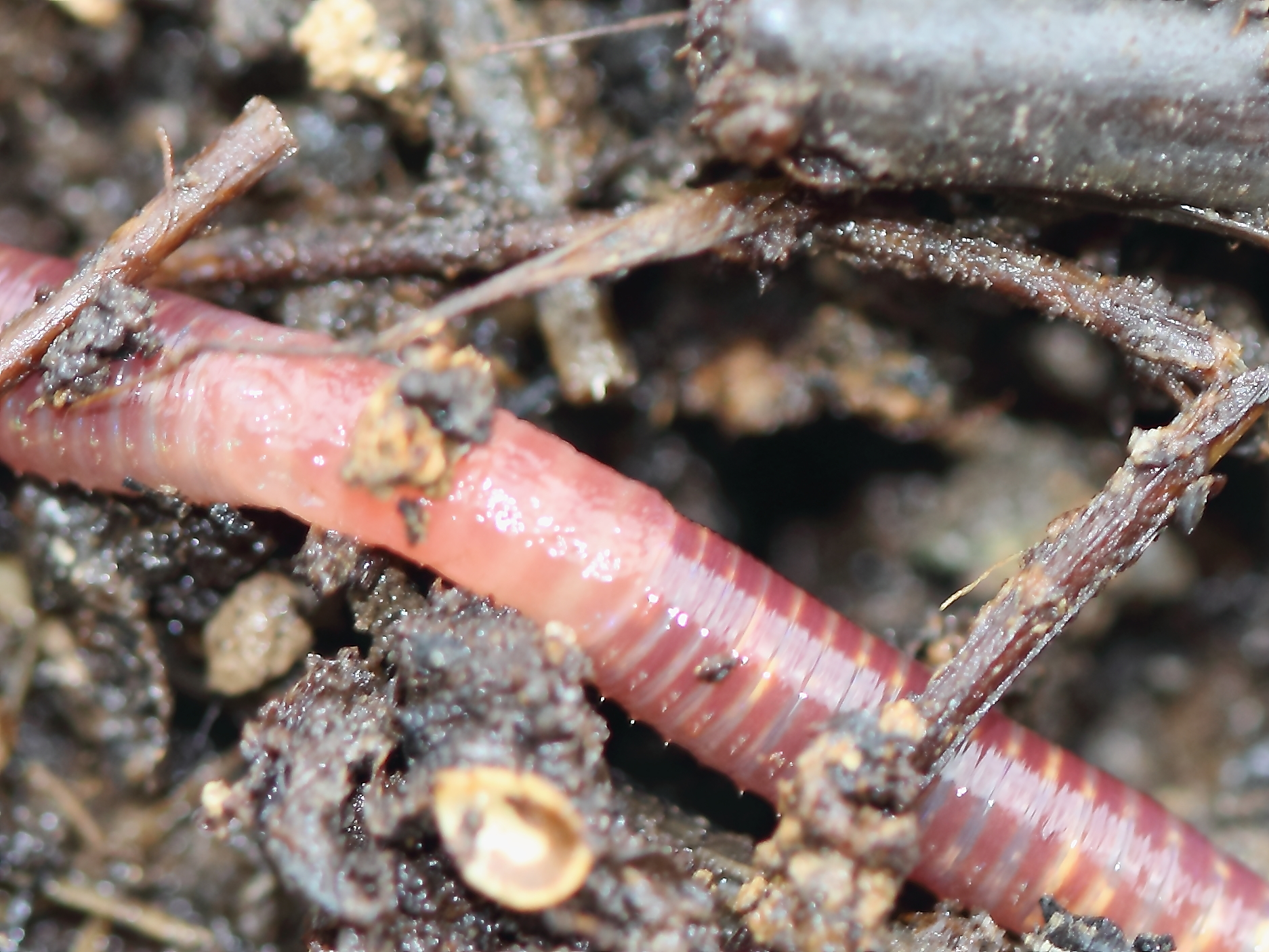
Close-up of E. fetida with visible bristles

== Related species ==
E. fetida is closely related to E. andrei, also referred to as E. f. andrei. The only simple way of distinguishing the two species is that E. fetida is sometimes lighter in colour, however identification by morphology is not reliable. Molecular analyses have confirmed their identity as separate species, and breeding experiments have shown that they do produce hybrids.

The mitochondrial genetic characteristics of the Irish population of E. fetida could be the result of reproductive isolation, so suggests that this sample may constitute an unrecognized species or subspecies of E. fetida.

== Reproduction ==
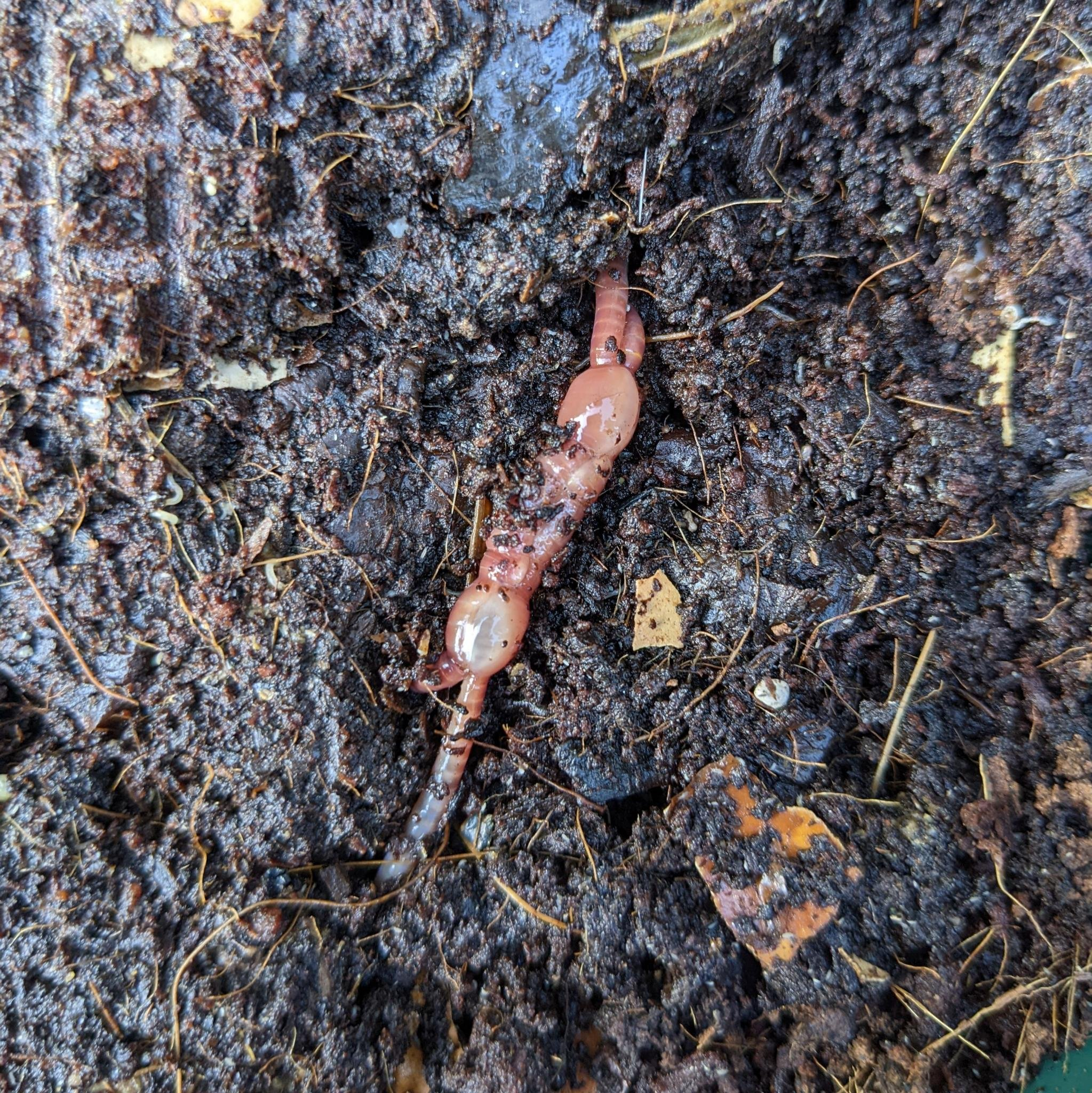
E. fetida copulating in a compost bin

As with other earthworm species, E. fetida is hermaphroditic, and uniparental reproduction is possible, even if usually the reproduction is between copulating individuals. The two worms join clitella, the large, lighter-colored bands which contain the worms' reproductive organs, and which are only prominent during the reproduction process. The two worms exchange sperm. This sperm can be stored for several months in a specialized organ called the spermathecae. In ideal conditions, each earthworm can lay approximately 3 cocoons per week, and each cocoon may contain anywhere from 1-9 fertilized eggs. These cocoons are lemon-shaped and are pale yellow at first, becoming more brownish as the worms inside become mature. These cocoons are clearly visible to the naked eye. At 25°C, E. fetida hatches from its cocoon in about 3 weeks.

== DNA repair ==
Ionizing radiation induces DNA strand breaks and oxidized DNA bases in both spermatogenic cells and somatic cells of E. fetida, and also induces the repair of these damages.

== Lifespan ==
The lifespan of E. fetida under controlled conditions varies between one and five years.

== Habitat ==
The ideal habitat of Eisenia fetida includes organic matter that they can feast on. Usually they live just beneath the surface to avoid light. The temperature of the mixture in which they reside should be between 4.5°C to 32°C. In the summer, they will actively go deeper than 15 centimeters to find cooler areas as they don't prefer heat. The cocoons that they form can handle even harsher temperatures.
