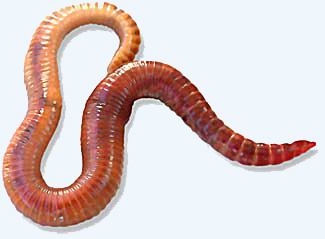
- Eisenia fetida

Scientific classification
- Kingdom: Animalia
- Phylum: Annelida
- Clade: Pleistoannelida
- Clade: Sedentaria
- Class: Clitellata
- Order: Opisthopora
- Family: Lumbricidae
- Genus: Eisenia; Malm, 1900

Type species
- Enterion fetidum Savigny, 1826

Species
- 14 species (see text)

= Eisenia (annelid) =

Genus of annelids

Eisenia is a genus of earthworms in the family Lumbricidae. They are sometimes known as rosy worms. The genus is named after Swedish-American scientist Gustav Eisen. They burrow in soil and sediment in both terrestrial and freshwater environments. They have Palaearctic distribution, with introduced populations elsewhere.

== Species ==
There are 14 recognized species:

- Eisenia andrei (Bouché, 1972)
- Eisenia anzac Blakemore, 2011
- Eisenia balatonica (Pop, 1943)
- Eisenia fetida (Savigny in Cuvier, 1826)
- Eisenia grandis Michaelsen, 1907
- Eisenia hydrophilica Kvavadze, 1979
- Eisenia japonica (Michaelsen, 1891)
- Eisenia kucenkoi Michaelsen, 1903
- Eisenia lucens (Waga, 1857)
- Eisenia nordenskioldi (Eisen, 1878)
- Eisenia rhodopensis Černosvitov, 1937
- Eisenia schelkovnikovi Michaelsen, 1907
- Eisenia skorikowi Michaelsen, 1903
- Eisenia spelaea (Rosa, 1901)
- Eisenia zhongshanensis (Liu, T., 2026)

There are also many described species with uncertain status.
