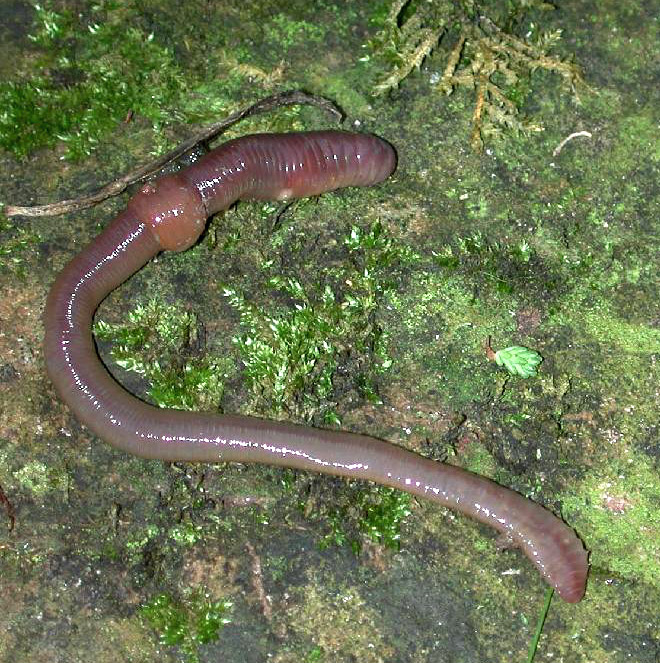
- Lumbricus terrestris, the common European earthworm

Scientific classification
- Kingdom: Animalia
- Phylum: Annelida
- Clade: Pleistoannelida
- Clade: Sedentaria
- Class: Clitellata
- Order: Opisthopora
- Superfamily: Lumbricoidea
- Family: Lumbricidae; Rafinesque, 1815

Genera
- See text

= Lumbricidae =

Family of annelid worms

The Lumbricidae are a family of earthworms. About 33 lumbricid species have become naturalized around the world, but the bulk of the species are in the Holarctic region, from Canada (e.g. Bimastos lawrenceae on Vancouver Island) and the United States (e.g. Eisenoides carolinensis, E. lonnbergi, and most Bimastos spp.) and throughout Eurasia to Japan (e.g. Eisenia japonica, E. koreana, and Helodrilus hachiojii). An enigmatic species in Tasmania is Eophila eti. Currently, 670 valid species and subspecies in about 42 genera are recognized. This family includes the majority of earthworm species well known in Europe and Asia.

== Etymology ==
While the origins of the word "lumbricidae" have long puzzled historians, recent scholarship has placed its roots in the Latin "umbilicus," due to the resemblance of earthworms to the umbilical cord.

== Genera ==
The family consists of these genera:

- Allolobophora Eisen, 1874
- Alpodinaridella Mršić, 1987
- Aporrectodea Orley, 1885
- Bimastos Moore, 1893
- Castellodrilus Qiu & Bouché, 1998 stat. nov.
- Cataladrilus Qiu & Bouché, 1998
- Cernosvitovia Omodeo, 1956
- Creinella Mršić, 1986
- Dendrobaena Eisen, 1874
- Eisenia Malm, 1877
- Eiseniella Michaelsen, 1900
- Eiseniona Omodeo, 1956
- Eophila Rosa, 1893
- Ethnodrilus Bouché, 1972
- Eumenescolex Qiu & Bouché, 1998
- Fitzingeria Zicsi, 1978
- Flabellodrilus Gérard, Decaëns & Marchán in Gérard et al., 2023
- Gatesona Qiu & Bouché, 1998
- Healyella Omodeo & Rota, 1989
- Helodrilus Hoffmeister, 1845
- Heraclescolex Qiu & Bouché, 1998
- Iberoscolex Qiu & Bouché, 1998
- Imetescolex Szederjesi, Marchán & Csuzdi In Szederjesi et al., 2022
- Italobalkaniona Mršić & Šapkarev, 1988
- Kenleenus Qiu & Bouché, 1998
- Kritodrilus Dumnicka, 1983
- Lumbricus Linnaeus, 1758
- Meroandriella Mršić, 1987
- Octodriloides Zicsi, 1986
- Octodrilus Omodeo, 1956
- Octolasion Örley, 1885
- Octolasium Michaelsen, 1900
- Omilurus Templeton, 1836
- Orodrilus Bouché, 1972
- Perelia Easton, 1983
- Philomontanus Bozorgi, Seiedy, Malek, Aira, Pérez-Losada & Domínguez, 2019
- Pietromodeona Qiu & Bouché, 1998
- Postandrilus Qiu & Bouché, 1998
- Proctodrilus Zicsi, 1985
- Prosellodrilus Bouché, 1972
- Reynoldsia Qiu & Bouché, 1998
- Satchellius Gates, 1975
- Scherotheca Bouché, 1972
- Spermophorodrilus Bouché, 1975
- Tetragonurus Eisen, 1874 is preoccupied by a genus of fish: Tetragonurus Risso, 1810. Tetragonurus Eisen is a junior homonym, now accepted as Eiseniella.
- Zophoscolex Qiu & Bouché, 1998

== Range ==
The worms in the family Lumbricidae originate from Europe, but over time, members of the family have since been introduced and spread around the globe.

=== Europe ===
Members of Lumbricidae are native to Europe and are most diverse in southern Europe. Thirty species from the family occur in Ireland and Britain. Notably, a single mature individual of the species Prosellodrilus amplisetosus was found in a survey of soil biodiversity in Ireland. P. amplisetosis had never been recorded in Ireland before, but is commonly found in France or Spain. It is thought to have been introduced by humans through agricultural supplies. Another interesting case is of the species Dendrobaena attemsi in Scandinavia. It was first found in a national park in Sweden, the furthest north the species has been found. The discovery of D. attemsi implies the range of the species is moving north. Not only in Sweden are species of Lumbricidae expanding their range; many of the species found in Finland are exhibiting similar increases in range and Lumbricidae worms are also expanding into northeastern Europe, starting from the near Baltic Sea.

A 2022 molecular phylogenetic study of the highly diverse Franco-Iberian genus Zophoscolex showed most of the Iberian species to form a distinct clade, formally described as Castellodrilus stat. nov. Other species were moved to the genera Cataladrilus and Compostelandrilus, with the remaining species remaining in Zophoscolex restricted to French representatives.

=== Asia ===
The Lumbricidae make up the majority of earthworms found in China, despite not being native to the area.

At higher elevations in India, some species of Lumbicidae can be found.

=== North America ===
When European settlers came to North America, so did European earthworms including the Lumbricidae. Before this, the area in North America where glaciers had been were mostly worm-free. Lumbricidae worms are known to be expanding into the Great Lakes region. The introduced worms have an impact on the native species and environments. Species from the family, such as Lumbricus rubellus, are believed to have displaced the local species in a number of regions. In others, Lumbricidae species outweigh the native species in biomass. Despite this, they are not as productive in processing nitrogen and phosphorus as the native species. Lumbricidae worms also tend to have a higher species richness than native North American worms, though the species richness of both the native and Lumbricidae decreases with increasing latitudes.

=== New Zealand and Australia ===
Similar to North America, worms from the family were introduced to New Zealand and Australia by European settlers.

== Predators ==
Harvestmen, especially from the genera Leiobunum and Hadrobunus, are known to consume Lumbricidae earthworms. This happens mostly in temperate regions. Another species known to prey on lumbricids is Ichthyophis bannanicus, the Bannan caecilian. Lumbricids are an important part of its diet.
