= Giant earthworm =

The Giant earthworm is a name often given to a variety of large invertebrates in the class Clitellata, many being from the family Megascolecidae. It may refer to:

== Australia and New Zealand ==
- Giant Gippsland earthworm, up to 3 m in length
- Spenceriella gigantea, up to 1.4 m in length
- Lake Pedder earthworm, extinct

== North America ==
- Giant Palouse earthworm, up to 1 m in length
- Oregon giant earthworm, up to 0.9 m in length

== South America ==
- Rhinodrilus fafner, extinct

== Europe ==
- Lumbricus badensis, up to 0.6 m in length

== Africa ==
- Microchaetus rappi up to 1.8 m in length

== Southeast Asia ==
- Amynthas mekongianus, the Mekong worm, up to 2.9 m (10 ft) in length
- Kinabalu giant earthworm, up to 0.7 m in length

== Cryptozoology ==
- Indus worm, Pakistan
- Lambton Worm, North East England
- Minhocão, Brazil
- Mongolian death worm, Gobi Desert
- Tatzelwurm, European Alps, a hoax

== See also ==
- Archispirostreptus gigas, a giant millipede
- Caecilian, a worm-like amphibian
- Giant tube worm
- Lineus longissimus or bootlace worm, up to 55 metres long
- Marine worm
- Sheltopusik, a glass lizard with worm-like appearance
- Sphaerotheriida, the giant pill millipede
