= Microchaetus rappi =

Scientific classification
- Kingdom: Animalia
- Phylum: Annelida
- Clade: Pleistoannelida
- Clade: Sedentaria
- Class: Clitellata
- Order: Opisthopora
- Family: Microchaetidae
- Genus: Microchaetus
- Species: M. rappi

Binomial name
- Microchaetus rappi Beddard, 1886

Species of annelid

Microchaetus rappi, the African giant earthworm, is a large earthworm in the family Microchaetidae, the largest of the segmented worms (commonly called earthworms). It averages about 1.4 meters (4.6 ft) in length, but can reach a length at least of 1.8 meters (5.9 ft) and can weigh over 1.5 kilograms (3.3 lb).

== Original discovery ==
Microchaetus rappi was first described in 1849 by Dr. Rapp as Lumbricus microchaetus with "an associated proposal for a new genus named Microchaetus" (p. 31). Microchaetus was also presented as a possible new genus at the time. The site in where it was originally documented was labelled as 'Cape', a southern region in South Africa. They were described to surface after heavy rain, were almost 1.20 meters (3.9 ft) long, 1.80 meters (5.9 ft) when stretched out, and were "about as thick as one's forefinger". In a letter from Rapp to his colleague Beddard, it was stated that "these worms appear only one, two, or three times a year ... They never seem to return to the earth, but to be killed within six hours by the heat of the sun". The letter goes on to state that "no domestic animal whatever — dogs, pigs, fowls &c.— touch them". The soil they were found in was described as "impregnated with brackish water". Plisko states in her article that the broad description of the site "was imprecise", and when originally described by Rapp, "the recorded observations on the anatomy ... were very few". In the same paper, Beddard requested and received specimens of large earthworms for careful dissection and study. After dissection, he decided that the species of worm should be Microchaeta rappi rather than L. microchaetus.

== Taxonomy ==
According to Plisko, taxonomic problems in regards to M. rappi have been present for decades. Originally classified as Lumbricus microchaetus by Rapp, it was proposed by Beddard in 1886 that the name should be changed to Microchaetus rappi and "the specimen previously described by Rapp should also be recorded under this new name". In 1886, Benham accepted the change in taxonomy "as valid for the species described by Rapp, [and] relegated the original name microchaetus to the synonymy of rappi".

The genus Microchaetus is classified and grouped through a key that details anatomic features of each genii. Organisms classified as Microchaetus rappi have "excretory system holonephric; nephropores present; only one gizzard present, in segment 7 ... testes and male funnels in other than proandric arrangement ... testes and male pores in holandric arrangement; nephiridial bladders V-shaped ... spermathecae always prosterior to testis locations"

At present, the family Microchaetidae is currently constituted of six genera. These are: Microchaetus, Geogeina, Kazimierzus, Tritogenia, Michalakus, and Proandricus.

== Anatomy ==
=== External characteristics ===
Beddard described M. rappi as having "extreme length" that "[was] difficult to state with certainty", with a dark green colouration which darkened to a duller green the further down the body. The underside was described as being "a flesh-red" that darkened into grey when "placed in spirit" for preservation. Benham reported that the exterior of his specimen was "in colour, a beautiful iridescent, greenish brown dorsally and laterally, whilst ventrally it is of a pink tint". He went on to describe a "deep green" clitellum, and a "bright pink orange" belly. He also described an increase in body thickness in somites 4–7, "due to the thickness of the muscular layers of the body wall". His specimen had a noticeable clitellum due to the fact that it was green, and that it was "further forwards than in Lumbricus", extending over the specimen's 13-25th somites. This may be one of the discrepancies referred to in Plisko's 1999 paper, the "differences in clitellum".

Benham described the mouth as "nearly terminal, ... overlapped by the small prostomium ... large and circular", and its anus as "subterminal, [with a] horizontal slit". There was also a lack of dorsal pores on his specimen, with clear nephridiopores, the first being at the fourth annulus.

=== Internal anatomy ===
Benham's specimen had "minute" setae, arranged "four couples in each somite", with one pair being "quite lateral", the "other pair latero-ventral". Near the front, the setae on the underside were longer and had a different form to setae over the rest of the body; "the thickened region, usually about the middle in the ordinary setae, is ... just below the free end, giving the appearance of a spear-head". He could not locate the oviducal pore or the oviduct, but concluded it must be close to the ovary he located in somite 13. The spermathecal pores in his specimen were "very numerous and minute ... [and] it was only after dissection that [he] found where they [were] situated ... on the anterior edge of somites [12-15]". Sperm-pores were not visible on the surface "as there [were] no papillae or other marks ... but by tracing down the sperm duct [it was found] to end in somite [19]". No capsulogenous glands were found by Benham. The "ordinary epidermis [consisted] of the usual elements ... columnar cells ... and goblet cells ... [with the] columnar cells ... more squeezed together ... towards their inner ends" He went on to describe the cuticle as "traversed by striae in two directions, and shows the numerous pores from the goblet cells, each at the junction of two striae". The circular muscular layer of M. rappi is thick and grouped into strands separated by connective tissue for form an oblique shape, and is layered in alternating circular and longitudinal muscles.

The digestive tract of M. rappi consists of: "the buccal region, ... the pharynx, ... esophagus, ... gizzard, ... tubular intestine with gland, ... sacculated intestine, and ... rectum". The buccal region is a short, slightly protrusible, thin-walled section directly after the mouth that is theorised to have the function of exposing the muscular pharynx of M. rappi to food, allowing it to grasp and consume food with the pharynx directly. The pharynx, the next digestive organ, is held to the body wall via intrinsic muscles. It is a muscular organ that "does not quite reach the first septum, and thus only occupies somite [2] and part of somite [3]". Following the pharynx is the gizzard, and is located in somite 6. Leading from the gizzard to the sacculated intestine, the tubular intestine is cylindrical and is lined with a thick, muscular wall and "longitudinal ridges". The tubular intestine widens into the thin-walled sacculated intestine in somite 12, further widening to about three times its previous diameter by the next somite. It retains this diameter in following somites until it constricts as it "passes through the septa". Due to the thin-walls and vascular density of this region, when living or recently deceased it is a red colour in appearance. Ending the digestive tract of M. rappi, the rectum allows for the excretion of waste.

In Plisko's 2013 article, she characterises M. rappi as having a "large body size ... extending over one meter in length, sometimes over 2 meters", with "characteristic external subdivision of preclitellar segments, ... [V-shaped] nephridial bladders" and double dorsal blood vessels. They also have multiple spermathecae per segment with "pores always located in post-testicular segments" and "two pair of seminal vesicles, in two segments". The "clitellum and tubercula pubertatis exceptionally extended on numerous segments (from 10 to 34, or on some of these segments)".

== Research discrepancies ==
Microchaetus rappi has a history of confusion as being synonymous with M. microchaetus. In 1886, Benham "provided a comprehensive description of [a specimen] as Microchaeta rappi Beddard, 1886, despite differences in the position of clitellum, tubercula pubertatis and number of spermathecae". Beddard made the same mistake in his 1895 study, where "the differences between species described by himself and Benham (1886a,b) were ignored, and the position of the clitellum on 10-25 was indicated". Due to these discrepancies, it was assumed that the material was in regards to one species only. From this, the ensuing debates in the scientific literature focused on the questions of names, species, and genus.

In 1891, Rosa labelled a specimen as M. rappi, as well as the worm in his study. When he was doing this, he "ignored the other label inserted in the bottle, which [was most likely] the original ... made at the time when Rapp's material was deposited in the NHM". Further comparison of specimens at the British Museum of Natural History (BMNH) by Plisko showed that "although Beddard's (1886a,b) comprehensive description of rappi clearly distinguishes it from microchaetus, other data supplied later by Beddard (1895) include characters for both rappi and microchaetus".

== See also ==
- Giant Palouse earthworm – a vulnerable North American species
- Oregon giant earthworm – a relative of the Palouse earthworm. Specimens have been recorded at 1.3 m (4 feet) long
- Lumbricus badensis – giant (Badish) earthworm
- Giant Gippsland earthworm – giant Australian earthworm
