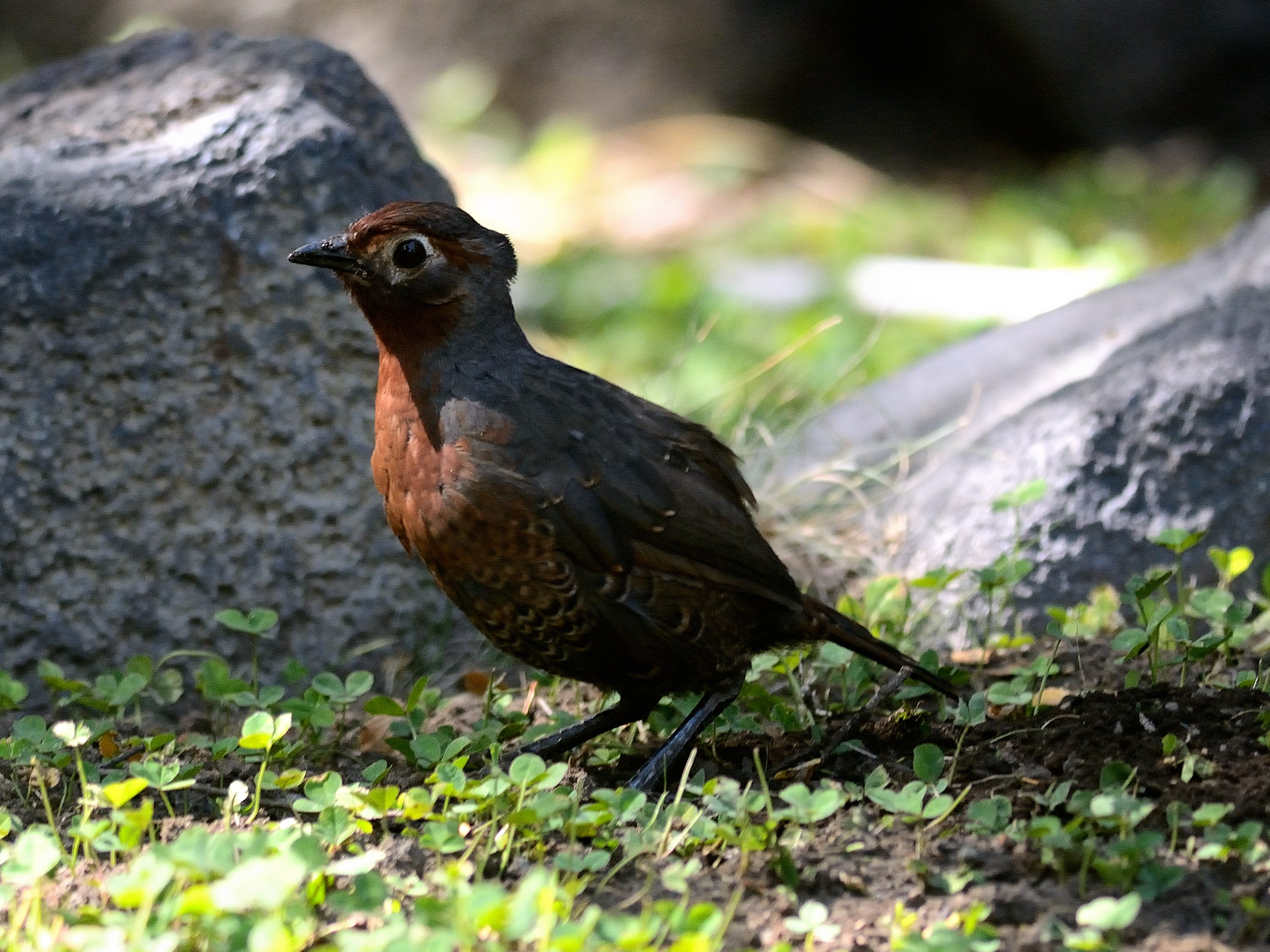

Conservation status
- Least Concern (IUCN 3.1)

Scientific classification
- Kingdom: Animalia
- Phylum: Chordata
- Class: Aves
- Order: Passeriformes
- Family: Rhinocryptidae
- Genus: Pteroptochos
- Species: P. castaneus

Binomial name
- Pteroptochos castaneus Philippi & Landbeck, 1864

= Chestnut-throated huet-huet =

Species of bird

The chestnut-throated huet-huet (Pteroptochos castaneus) is a large passerine bird of the family Rhinocryptidae. At an average mass of 165 grams (5.8 oz), it is, with the related black-throated huet-huet, the largest rhinocryptid and the third-heaviest tracheophone suboscine behind the giant and great antpittas. It is a stockily-built bird, averaging 23 centimetres (9.1 in) in length with a predominantly dark brown plumage except for a dark red throat and a pale buff bar on its wind – lacking in the black-throated species. For many decades intense debate existed as to whether these two were one species or two, but molecular studies in the 1990s demonstrated that the two species had been separated since before the Patagonian Ice Sheet first formed in southern Chile.

The species is found in temperate forest of Nothofagus species and Austrocedrus chilensis on the humid fringe of the Mediterranean climate zone of Chile, chiefly in Biobío, Maule and parts of O'Higgins Regions, and also in a small adjacent area of Neuquén Province in Argentina.

The species sometimes occurs in exotic Pinus radiata plantations, but only if there is a dense understory of shrubs, as it cannot move across habitat without dense understory as shown by a study of the fragmented Maulino forest. The Chestnut-Throated Huet-Huet feeds on insects and their larvae, and also a substantial number of seeds and fruit, which it digs for in the forest floor with its long claws. It may be important in the dispersal of certain forest plants.

Breeding occurs in spring between September and December, but the burrows ordinarily used to nest are dug during the winter rainy season when the soil is loosest. The burrows can be as much as 3 metres (9.8 ft) deep and contain two oval white eggs, which are very large for the bird's size, typically averaging 35.6 millimetres (1.4 in) long and 27.9 millimetres (1.1 in) wide with a mass of 14 grams (0.5 oz). It is believed both sexes incubate the eggs (as is usual for tracheophone suboscines), but the incubation period is not documented.

The huet-huets are well known for their vocalisations, and the song of the chestnut-throated huet-huet is a series of resonant "hoots" that unlike its more southerly counterpart, is typically given as a duet between pairs. The song is higher, softer and faster than the black-throated species, and the call is a "wehk, wehk, wehk" given in alarm.
