= D. americanus =

D. americanus may refer to:

- Daptrius americanus, a bird species
- Deiphon americanus, a trilobite species in the genus Deiphon
- Dictyoclostus americanus, a brachiopod species in the genus Dictyoclostus
- Driloleirus americanus, an earthworm species

== See also ==
- Americanus (disambiguation)
