= Lateral heart =

Lateral hearts, also known as pseudohearts or commissural vessels, are blood vessels on either side of the alimentary canal of some annelids that pump blood from the dorsal vessel to the ventral vessel.

The lateral hearts of Lumbricus terrestris are located in body segments 6–11.
