= Rhinodrilus fafner =

Conservation status
- Data Deficient (IUCN 3.1)

Scientific classification
- Kingdom: Animalia
- Phylum: Annelida
- Clade: Pleistoannelida
- Clade: Sedentaria
- Class: Clitellata
- Order: Haplotaxida
- Family: Rhinodrilidae
- Genus: Rhinodrilus
- Species: R. fafner

Binomial name
- Rhinodrilus fafner Michaelsen, 1918

Species of annelid

Rhinodrilus fafner is a presumed extinct giant earthworm of the family Rhinodrilidae. It is only known by the badly preserved holotype discovered in 1912 near Belo Horizonte in the Brazilian state of Minas Gerais and described in 1918 by German zoologist Wilhelm Michaelsen (1860–1937) from the National History Museum in Hamburg. The collected individual is 210 cm long, 24 mm in diameter, and consists of 600 segments. Along with Amynthas mekongianus (Cognetti, 1922) and Megascolides australis, Rhinodrilus fafner is among the largest known giant earthworms. Rhinodrilus fafner was confined to a small habitat and vanished possibly due to habitat destruction. It was officially declared extinct by the Brazilian Ministry of Environment (MMA) in 2003. However, the rediscoveries of the Giant Palouse earthworm in 2005 and the Brazilian earthworm Fimoscolex sporadochaetus in 2007 created hope that Rhinodrilus fafner may be found again.
