= James Steffen =

James or Jim Steffen may refer to:

- Jim Steffen (1936–2015), American football player
- James F. Steffen, American ecologist
