= Samuel James (disambiguation) =

Samuel James is an actor.

Samuel James may also refer to:

- Samuel Wooster James, American scientist

== See also ==
- Sam James (disambiguation)
