= James F. Steffen =

American entomologist

Jim Steffen
- Citizenship: United States
- Education: University of Wisconsin-Green Bay (B.S. and M.S.)
- Scientific career
- Workplaces: Woodland Dunes Nature Center, University of Wisconsin-Green Bay, Chicago Botanic Garden
- Thesis: Some Effects Of Clearcutting On Songbird Populations In The Northern Hardwood Forest (1980)

James F. Steffen is an American ecologist with expertise in Midwestern United States flora and fauna.

== Career ==
At the Chicago Botanic Garden in Glencoe, Illinois Steffen leads ecological restoration, management activities, and research studies in the Mary Mix McDonald Woods, a 100-acre oak woodland complex. His expertise is broad, ranging from the identification and natural history of Midwest plants, birds, bats, spiders and other arthropods, and worms, to native plant propagation and restoration ecology. Steffen's most recent studies have focused on the ecology and composition of soil and leaf litter communities, such as the association between invasive European buckthorn (Rhamnus cathartica) and European earthworms (Lumbricus spp.).

== Selected publications ==
- Steffen, James F. (1997). "Seed Treatment and Propagation Methods". In Packard, Stephen; Mutel, Cornelia F. (eds.). The Tallgrass Restoration Handbook: For Prairies, Savannas, and Woodlands. Island Press.
- Steffen, J. F.; Draney, M. L. (2009). "Diversity and activity of ground-dwelling spiders (Araneae) in four sub-communities in a degraded oak woodland at the Chicago botanic garden, Cook County, Illinois". Great Lakes Entomologist. 42 (3–4): 185–203.
- Steffen, J. F.; Palincsar, J.; Funk, F. M.; Larkin, D. J. (2012). "Activity and Diversity of Collembola (Insecta) and Mites (Acari) in Litter of a Degraded Midwestern Oak Woodland". Great Lakes Entomologist. 42 (1–2): 1–18.
- Larkin, Daniel J.; Steffen, James F.; Gentile, Rachel M.; Zirbel, Chad R. (January 2014). "Ecosystem Changes Following Restoration of a Buckthorn-Invaded Woodland". Restoration Ecology. 22 (1): 89–97. doi:10.1111/rec.12016. S2CID 55349635.
