= Sam James =

Sam James may refer to:

- Sam James (EastEnders), fictional character
- Sam James (rugby union) (born 1994), English rugby union player
- Samantha James (born 1979), American singer

== See also ==
- Samuel James (disambiguation)
