= Lumbricus festivus =

Scientific classification
- Domain: Eukaryota
- Kingdom: Animalia
- Phylum: Annelida
- Clade: Pleistoannelida
- Clade: Sedentaria
- Class: Clitellata
- Order: Opisthopora
- Family: Lumbricidae
- Genus: Lumbricus
- Species: L. festivus

Binomial name
- Lumbricus festivus (Savigny, 1826)

Species of annelid worm

Lumbricus festivus, also known as the Quebec worm, is a type of earthworm, a species of annelid.
