= Lumbricus improvisus =

Scientific classification
- Domain: Eukaryota
- Kingdom: Animalia
- Phylum: Annelida
- Clade: Pleistoannelida
- Clade: Sedentaria
- Class: Clitellata
- Order: Opisthopora
- Family: Lumbricidae
- Genus: Lumbricus
- Species: L. improvisus

Binomial name
- Lumbricus improvisus Zicsi, 1963

Species of earthworm

Lumbricus improvisus is a species of earthworm in the family Lumbricidae.
