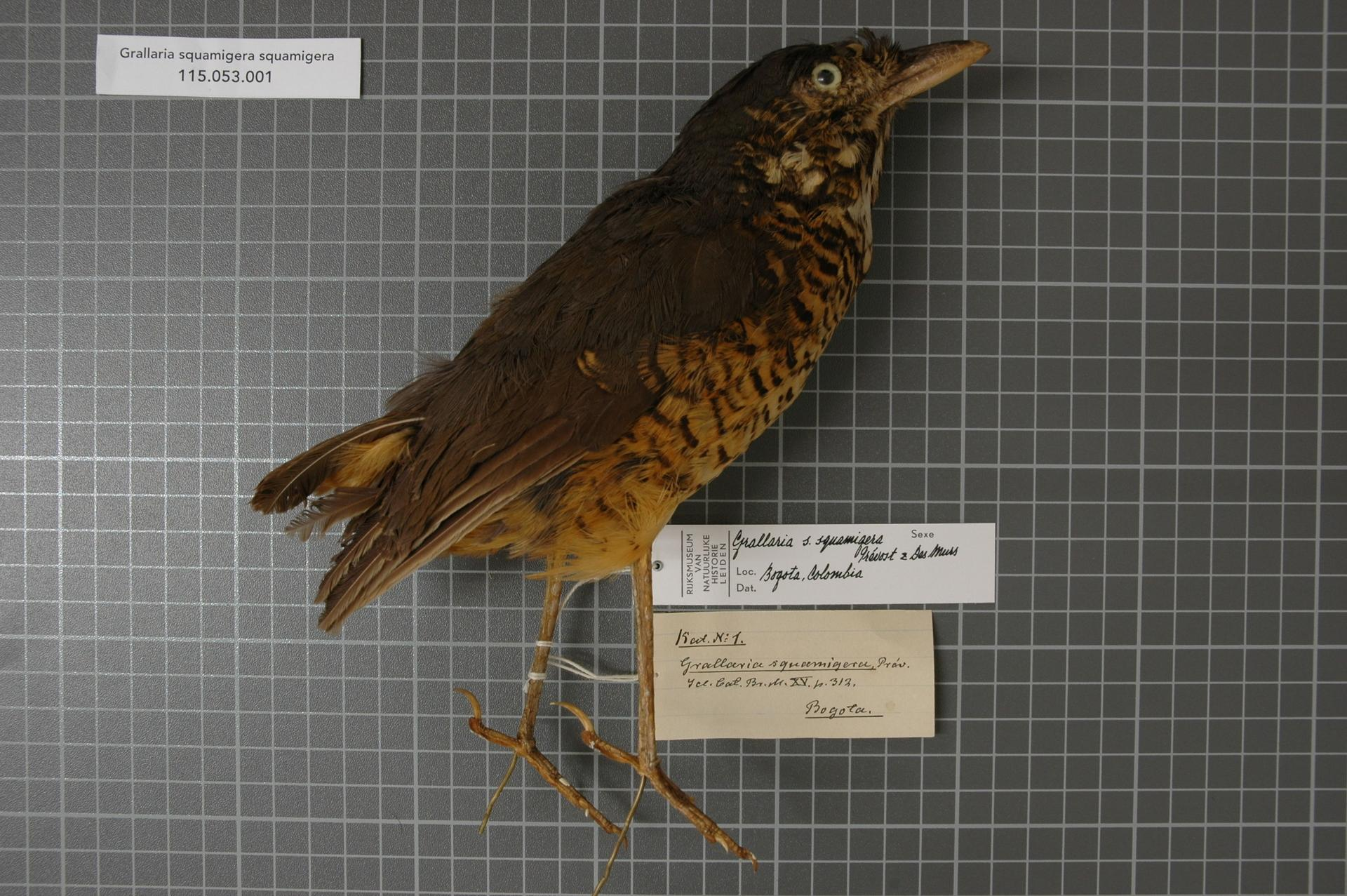
- Study skin of G. s. squamigera

Conservation status
- Least Concern (IUCN 3.1)

Scientific classification
- Kingdom: Animalia
- Phylum: Chordata
- Class: Aves
- Order: Passeriformes
- Family: Grallariidae
- Genus: Grallaria
- Species: G. squamigera

Binomial name
- Grallaria squamigera Prévost & Des Murs, 1842

= Undulated antpitta =

Species of bird

The undulated antpitta (Grallaria squamigera) is a bird in the family Grallariidae. It is found in Bolivia, Colombia, Ecuador, Peru, and Venezuela.

== Taxonomy and systematics ==
The undulated antpitta was first described by Florent Prévost and Marc Athanase Parfait Œillet des Murs in 1842 and assigned the binomial Grallaria squamigera. Between then and the present it was treated by different authors as a subspecies of the giant antpitta (G. gigantea) and its specific epithet misspelled as "Grallaria squamiger" before returning to its original, and present, binomial.

The undulated antpitta has two subspecies, the nominate G. s. squamigera (Prévost & Des Murs, 1842) and G. s. canicauda (Chapman, 1926).

== Description ==
Grallaria antpittas are a "wonderful group of plump and round antbirds whose feathers are often fluffed up...they have stout bills, very short tails, and very long bluish gray legs". The undulated antpitta is the largest member of its genus that occurs in the higher Andes; it is 20 to 24 cm (7.9 to 9.4 in) long and weighs 112 to 174 g (4.0 to 6.1 oz). The sexes have the same plumage. Adults of the nominate subspecies have a gray crown and nape and mostly ashy brown upperparts with a variable olivaceous wash. Most upperparts feathers have darker edges that give a scaly appearance. Their wings and tail are browner (less gray) than their upperparts. They have buffy-whitish or buffy-ochraceous lores on an otherwise yellowish fulvous face. Their throat is buffy-whitish or buffy-ochraceous with black stripes down the sides. Their underparts are yellowish fulvous that varies in tone from rather rich to pale yellowish with wavy black bars across all but their lower belly and vent area. Subspecies G. s. canicauda is similar to the nominate but has somewhat grayer upperparts, whiter lores and throat, and paler underparts. Adults of both subspecies have a dark brown iris, a dark gray to blackish maxilla, and a pinkish gray mandible.

== Distribution and habitat ==
The undulated antpitta has a disjunct distribution along the chain of the Andes. The nominate subspecies is found in western Venezuela between Trujillo and Táchira, in all three of Colombia's Andean ranges, and through much of Ecuador into northern Peru. Subspecies G. s. canicauda is found in southwestern Ecuador and from Peru south and east of the Maranon River into central Bolivia. The species has intermediate plumages and the dividing line between the subspecies has not been exactly defined. The undulated antpitta inhabits humid temperate, subtropical, and tropical montane forest, including Polylepis woodlands, and is often associated with Chusquea bamboo thickets. It almost exclusively is found on the forest floor in its interior. In elevation it occurs between 2,000 and 3,300 m (6,600 and 10,800 ft) in Venezuela, between 2,200 and 3,700 m (7,200 and 12,100 ft) in Colombia and Ecuador, between 2,250 and 3,500 m (7,400 and 11,500 ft) in Peru, and up to 2,800 m (9,200 ft) in Bolivia.

== Behavior ==
=== Movement ===
The undulated antpitta is believed to be a year-round resident throughout its range but might make some short elevational movements.

=== Feeding ===
The undulated antpitta is one of several antpittas that regularly come to feeding stations set up to allow viewing them. There they are fed earthworms and similar invertebrates, which are thought to also be a large part of their natural diet. In the wild they also feed on arthropods and lizards. Away from feeding stations they are typically observed along trails early in the day, where they hop, pause, and dash to capture prey. They seldom fly beyond a short distance or higher than to a low branch. Most observations are of single birds or pairs and they apparently seldom join mixed-species feeding flocks.

=== Breeding ===
The undulated antpitta's breeding season varies geographically; in northern Ecuador nesting is concentrated in December and January. Only one nest is known. It was a bulky cup made mostly of green moss with some sticks and dead leaves and lined with fine flexible fibers and some pine needles. It was supported by several branches in scrubby vegetation about 2.5 m (8 ft) above the ground. It had one addled egg and a one- or two-day-old chick. A brooding adult fled the nest. The species' incubation period, time to fledging, and details of parental care are not known.

=== Vocalization ===
The undulated antpitta typically sings from dawn into the early morning and from a low perch. It sings at any time of the year but more frequently during the breeding season. Its song has been compared to the voice of some small owls, "a fast hollow quavering trill that slightly ascends in pitch and lasts 3-4 seconds, e.g. 'hohohohohohohohohohohoho', with [the] last few notes more enunciated". It also makes "a 4-6 second rapid, even-paced, rising then slightly falling, series of purred notes: pr'r'r'r'r'r'r'r'r'r'R'R'R'R'R'R'R'ew". Another, seldom heard, vocalization is a "low-pitched whistled wooh repeated two or three times".

== Status ==
The IUCN has assessed the undulated antpitta as being of Least Concern. It has a large range; its population size is not known and is believed to be stable. No immediate threats have been identified. It is considered locally fairly common in Venezuela, local in Colombia, common in western Ecuador, uncommon in eastern Ecuador, and "often uncommon" in Peru. The species occurs in several protected areas. "Although there are no specifically documented effects of human activity on the species...several authors have suggested that the Undulated Antpitta may be hunted in some parts of its range."
