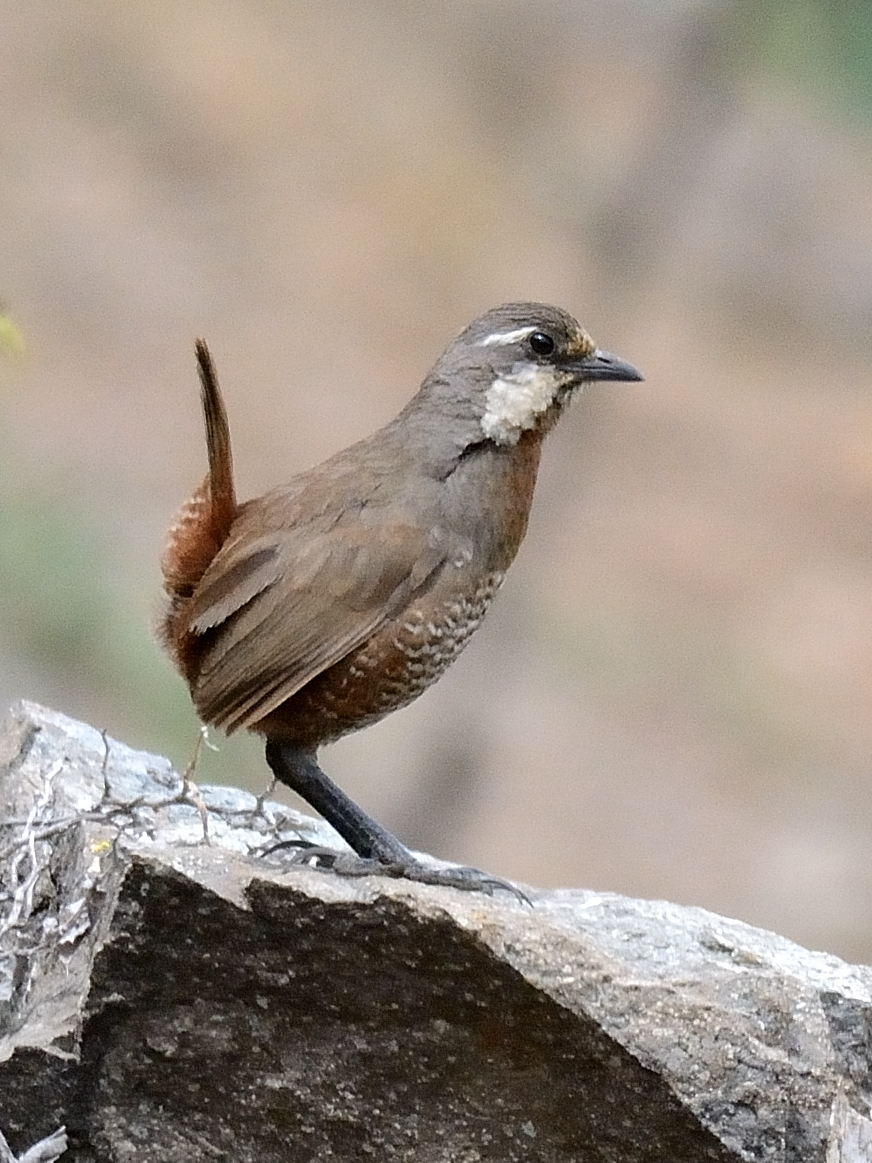
- Moustached turca (Pteroptochos megapodius)

Scientific classification
- Domain: Eukaryota
- Kingdom: Animalia
- Phylum: Chordata
- Class: Aves
- Order: Passeriformes
- Family: Rhinocryptidae
- Genus: Pteroptochos; Kittlitz, 1830

Type species
- Pteroptochos megapodius von Kittlitz, 1830

= Pteroptochos =

Genus of birds

Pteroptochos is a genus of birds in the tapaculo family Rhinocryptidae.

== Species ==
The genus contains the following three species:

Genus Pteroptochos – Kittlitz,, 1830 – three species
Common name	Scientific name and subspecies	Range	Size and ecology	IUCN status and estimated population
Chestnut-throated huet-huet	Pteroptochos castaneus Philippi & Landbeck,, 1864	Chile; Neuquén Province in Argentina.	Size: Habitat: Diet:	LC
Black-throated huet-huet	Pteroptochos tarnii (King, 1831)	southern/central Chile and adjacent western Argentina.	Size: Habitat: Diet:	LC
Moustached turca	Pteroptochos megapodius (Kittlitz, 1830) Two subspecies: P. m. megapodius (von Kittlitz, 1830); P. m. atacamae (R. A Philippi-B, 1946)	Chile	Size: Habitat: Diet:	LC
