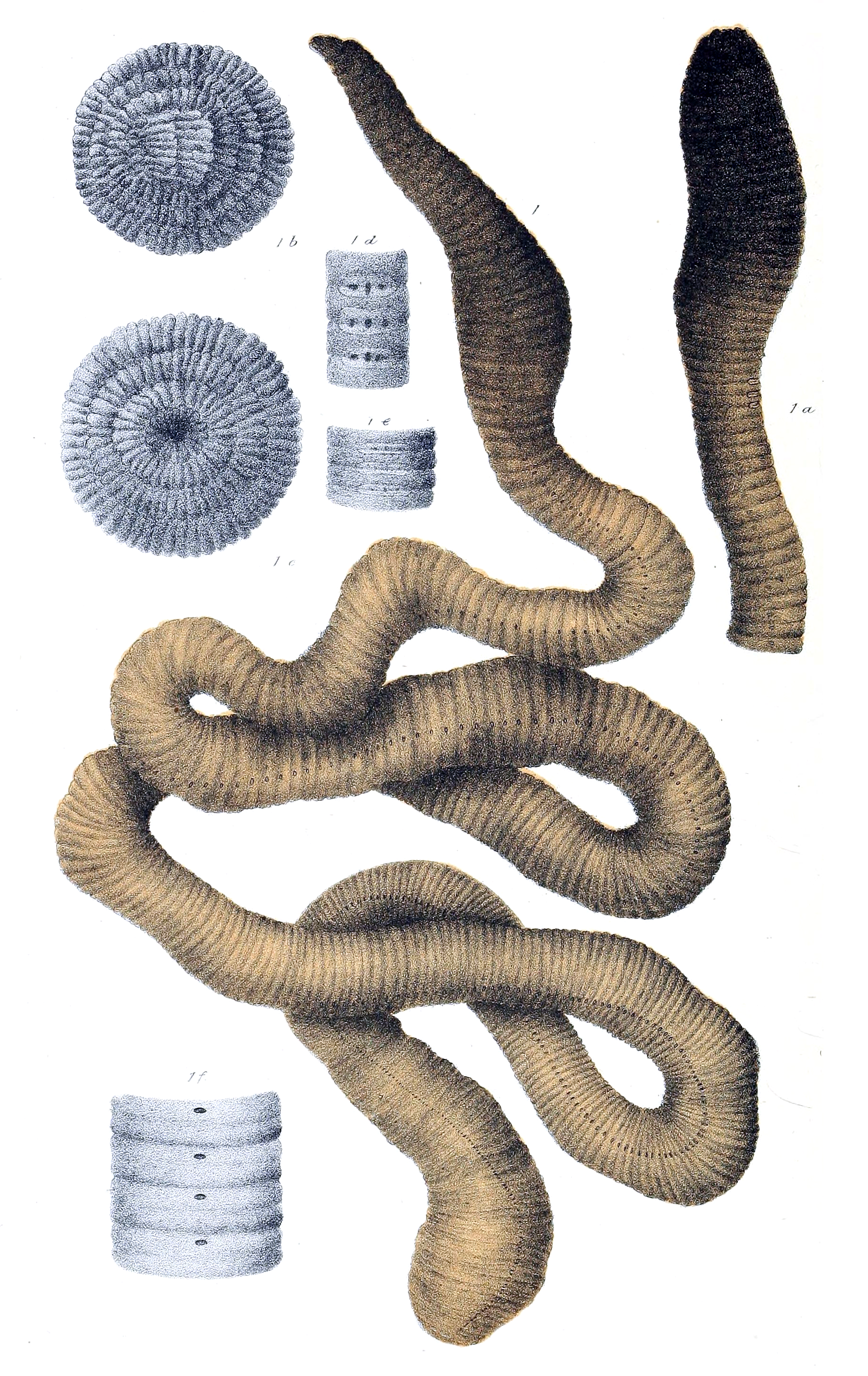

Conservation status
- Endangered (IUCN 3.1)

Scientific classification
- Kingdom: Animalia
- Phylum: Annelida
- Clade: Pleistoannelida
- Clade: Sedentaria
- Class: Clitellata
- Order: Opisthopora
- Family: Megascolecidae
- Genus: Megascolides
- Species: M. australis

Binomial name
- Megascolides australis McCoy, 1878

= Giant Gippsland earthworm =

Species of annelid worm

The giant Gippsland earthworm (Megascolides australis) is one of Australia's 1,000 native earthworm species.

== Description ==
It is typically 1 m (3.3 ft) long and 2 cm (1 in) in diameter although some specimens can reach 3 m (10 ft) in length. Their body is able to expand and contract, making them appear much larger. On average, they weigh about 200 g (7 oz). They have a dark purple head and a blue-grey body, and about 300 to 400 body segments.

== Ecology ==
They live in the subsoil of blue, grey, or red clay soils along stream banks and some south- or west-facing hills of their remaining habitat, which is in Gippsland in Victoria, Australia. These worms live in deep burrow systems and require water in their environment to respire. They have a relatively long life expectancy for invertebrates and can take 5 years to reach maturity. The reproductive period of the giant Gippsland earthworm mainly spans from September to December. They breed in the warmer months and produce egg capsules that are 4 to 7 cm (1.6 to 2.8 in) in length that are laid in their burrows. When these worms hatch in 12 months, they are around 20 cm (8 in) long.

Unlike most earthworms, which deposit castings on the surface, they spend almost all their time in burrows about 52 cm (20 in) in depth and deposit their castings there and can generally only be flushed out by heavy rain. They eat organic matter, as well as bacteria and fungi, which may have allowed them to better adapt to the change from a forest to pasture living area. They are usually very sluggish but can move rapidly through their burrows, causing an audible gurgling or sucking sound which allows them to be detected.

== Threatened status ==
Gippsland earthworm colonies are small and isolated, and the species' low reproductive rate and slow maturation make those small populations vulnerable. Their natural habitats are grasslands, and while they can survive beneath pastures, cultivation, heavy cattle grazing, and effluent run-off are adversarial to the species. The Gippsland earthworm requires moist, loamy soil to thrive; dense tree planting negatively affects soil humidity, which in turn negatively affects the species' habitat. No successful breeding has yet been achieved in captivity.

== Education ==
Until it closed in 2012 amid animal welfare concerns, Wildlife Wonderland Park near Bass, Victoria, was home to the Giant Earthworm Museum. Inside the worm-shaped museum, visitors could crawl through a magnified replica of a worm burrow and a simulated worm's stomach. Displays and educational material on the giant Gippsland earthworm and other natural history of Gippsland were also featured.

== Tourism ==
Interest in the giant Gippsland earthworm has been exploited by the local tourist industry, with an annual Karmai Festival in Korumburra. In the Boonwurrung language, it is said to have been called karmai.

== See also ==
- Giant Palouse earthworm - a vulnerable North American species
- Oregon giant earthworm - a relative of the Palouse earthworm, specimens have been recorded at 1.3 m (4 ft) long
- Lake Pedder earthworm - listed as the first "extinct" worm species from its original unique Tasmanian habitat
- Lumbricus badensis - giant (Badish) earthworm
- Microchaetus rappi - giant South African earthworm
