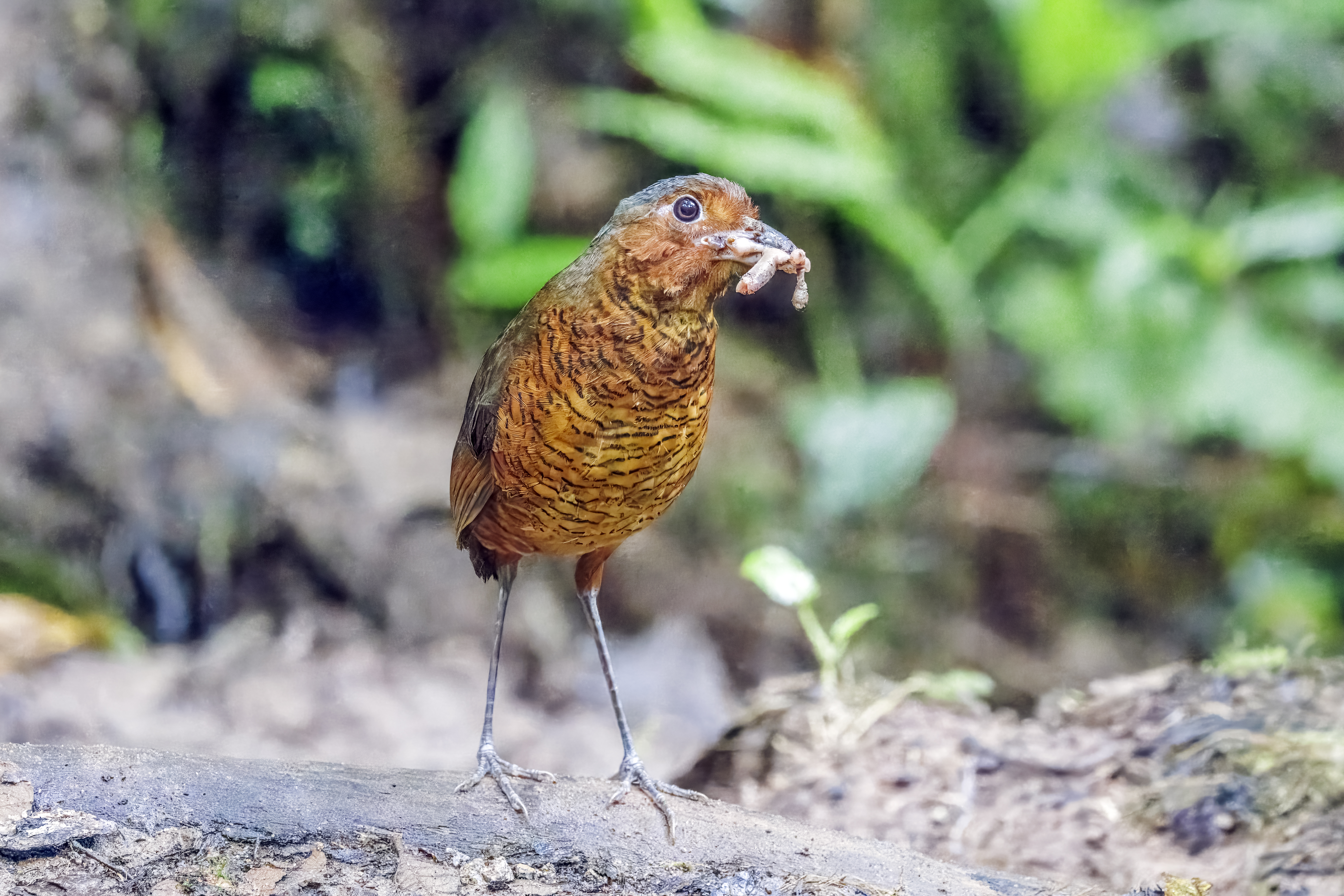

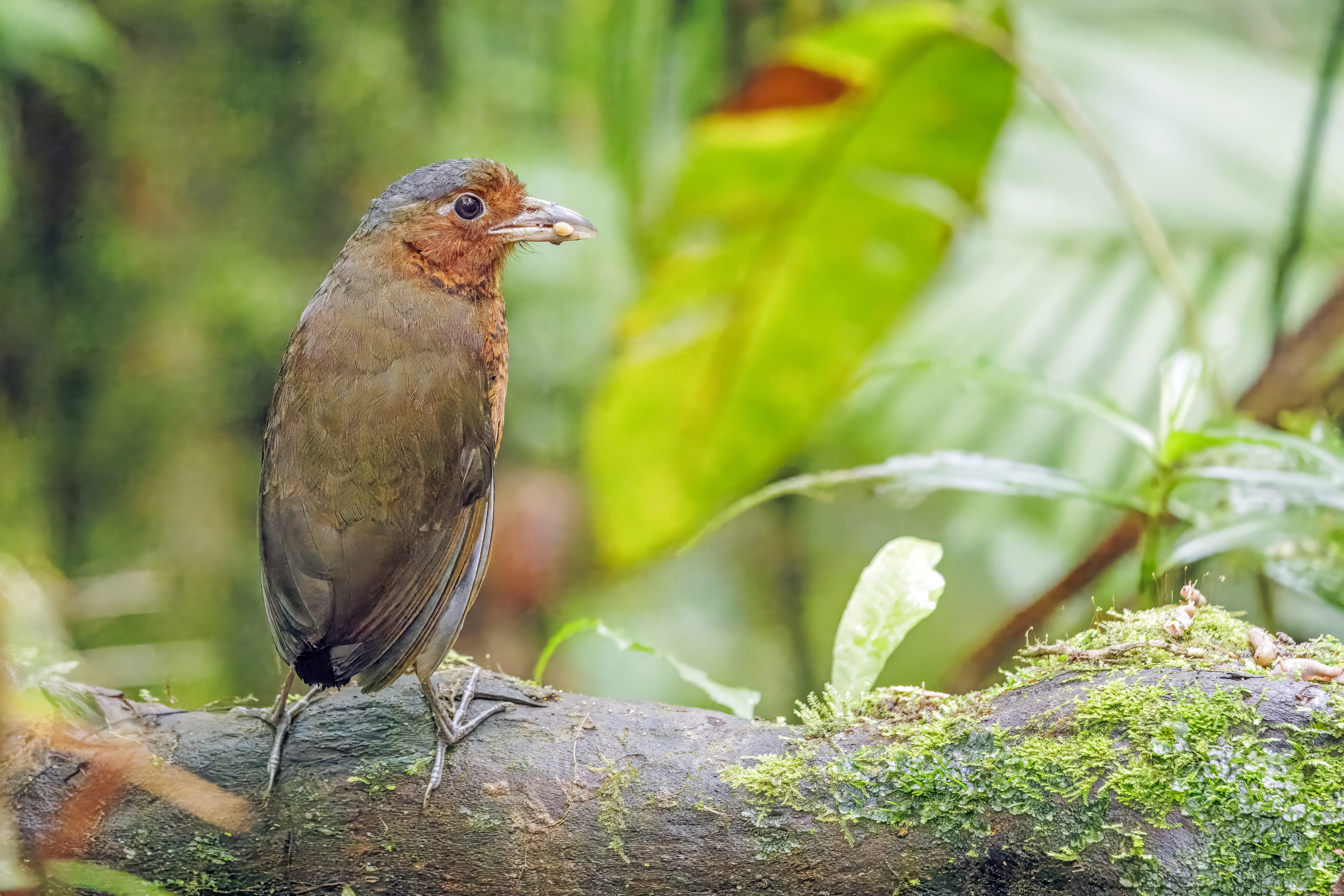
- G. g. hylodroma Refugio Paz de Las Aves; Pichincha Province, Ecuador

Conservation status
- Vulnerable (IUCN 3.1)

Scientific classification
- Kingdom: Animalia
- Phylum: Chordata
- Class: Aves
- Order: Passeriformes
- Family: Grallariidae
- Genus: Grallaria
- Species: G. gigantea

Binomial name
- Grallaria gigantea Lawrence, 1866

= Giant antpitta =

Species of bird

The giant antpitta (Grallaria gigantea) is a perching bird species in the antpitta family (Grallariidae). Rare and somewhat enigmatic, it is known only from Colombia and Ecuador. It is presumably a close relative of the similar undulated antpitta, G. squamigera, which occurs to the south of G. gigantea. The giant antpitta has three subspecies, one of which might be extinct.

== Description ==
G. gigantea is, as its name suggests, a huge antpitta. Length ranges from 24 to 28 centimetres (9.4 to 11.0 in), and weight is up to 300 grams (10.6 oz), which makes it easily the heaviest of all tracheophone suboscine birds – its nearest rival, the chestnut-throated huet-huet, is not known to exceed 185 grams (6.5 oz). Its back, wings, and the stubby tail are dusky olive-brown. The top of the head is pale to medium grey, running down to the neck. The remaining plumage is deep rufous-brown. The throat and breast feathers are black-edged, resulting in a dark barring in these regions. The bill is dark, strong and heavy; the eyes are likewise dark, while the legs and feet are grey.

The song consists of low-pitched fast trills, about 14-21 notes per second. These are maintained for several seconds, during which they rise in pitch and become louder. Trills are repeated after a pause of a few to about a dozen seconds, which varies irregularly throughout the length of the song.

The undulated antpitta (G. squamigera) is a bit smaller, with a pale hue to the malar region and a yellower belly. Its song is hard to distinguish, but rather than simply breaking off after a time, it ends with some additional trills, separated by pauses of increasing length.

== Ecology ==
In Colombia, historically, the subspecies G. g. lehmanni inhabited both slopes of the Cordillera Central, where specimens were taken in Cauca and Huila Departments before the mid-20th century, one (in 1941) in what today is Puracé National Natural Park. It has not definitely been relocated there, however. In 1988 and 1989, the species was recorded in La Planada Nature Reserve, Nariño Department, but the taxonomic identity of these birds requires verification.

In Ecuador, the nominate subspecies was formerly more widespread on the eastern slope of the Andes, but in recent times its presence is only confirmed in western Napo Province. Formerly, it was found (and may still be found in protected habitats) in eastern Carchi and Tungurahua Provinces. Subspecies hylodroma occurs on the western slope of the Andes in the Pichincha and Cotopaxi Provinces. Two old specimens supposedly of hylodroma are from a site called "El Tambo" that has not been decisively relocated (but probably is in western Cañar Province) and from Cerro Castillo in western Pichincha Province; the former is quite some distance away from the species' known range.

Its natural habitats are subtropical to temperate moist montane forests, with hylodroma recorded at 1,200–2,000 m (3,900–6,600 ft) ASL, gigantea from above 2,200 m (7,200 ft) ASL, and lehmanni from 3,000 m (9,800 ft) ASL. Occasionally, it frequents cloud forest swamps with abundant understory, pastures and secondary forest; overall, however, its survival seems to depend on primary forest.

Its food is largely terrestrial invertebrates, though arthropods are apparently not of key importance. Rather, the large Rhinodrilus earthworms may be a staple food. Beetle larvae and slugs have also been recorded as prey.

Little is known about its reproduction. In Pacha Quindi Nature Refuge and Botanical Gardens, an adult G. g. hylodroma was seen feeding a recently fledged young a large earthworm on April 19, 2001.

=== Status and conservation ===
With deforestation having claimed much suitable habitat already, the giant antpitta is classified as a vulnerable species by the IUCN. Between 2000 and 2004, it was uplisted to endangered status, as it was feared that habitat destruction was accelerating in the few areas where the birds were known to exist. This turned out to be less bad than assumed, and the species was downlisted again in 2004. Still, it is considered threatened and is known in less than 10 locations (a total of 1,900 square kilometers), with habitat continuing to decline in both quality and quantity, and some subpopulations on the brink of complete extinction. Also, it is estimated to number less than 2,500 mature birds, with less than 1,000 in any one subpopulation.

The main threats are unsustainable logging and land conversion for agriculture or narcotic plantations. Only within the range of the nominate subspecies does deforestation appear to have declined to levels where the species can be considered relatively secure; elsewhere, it remains extensive and may even threaten protected areas.

Puracé National Natural Park is the most likely site to hold any remaining population of G. g. lehmanni. The La Planada Nature Reserve subpopulation may have recently gone extinct; it was not found in the 1990s. G. g. hylodroma is found in Mindo-Nambillo Protection Forest, Bosque Integral Otonga, Refugio Paz de Aves near Nanegalito, Pacha Quindi Nature Refuge and Botanical Gardens, and the Maquipucuna and Río Guajalito forest reserves. However, around these protected areas, deforestation is severe. The nominate subspecies occurs in the protected forests of Antisana Ecological Reserve and San Isidro Lodge.
