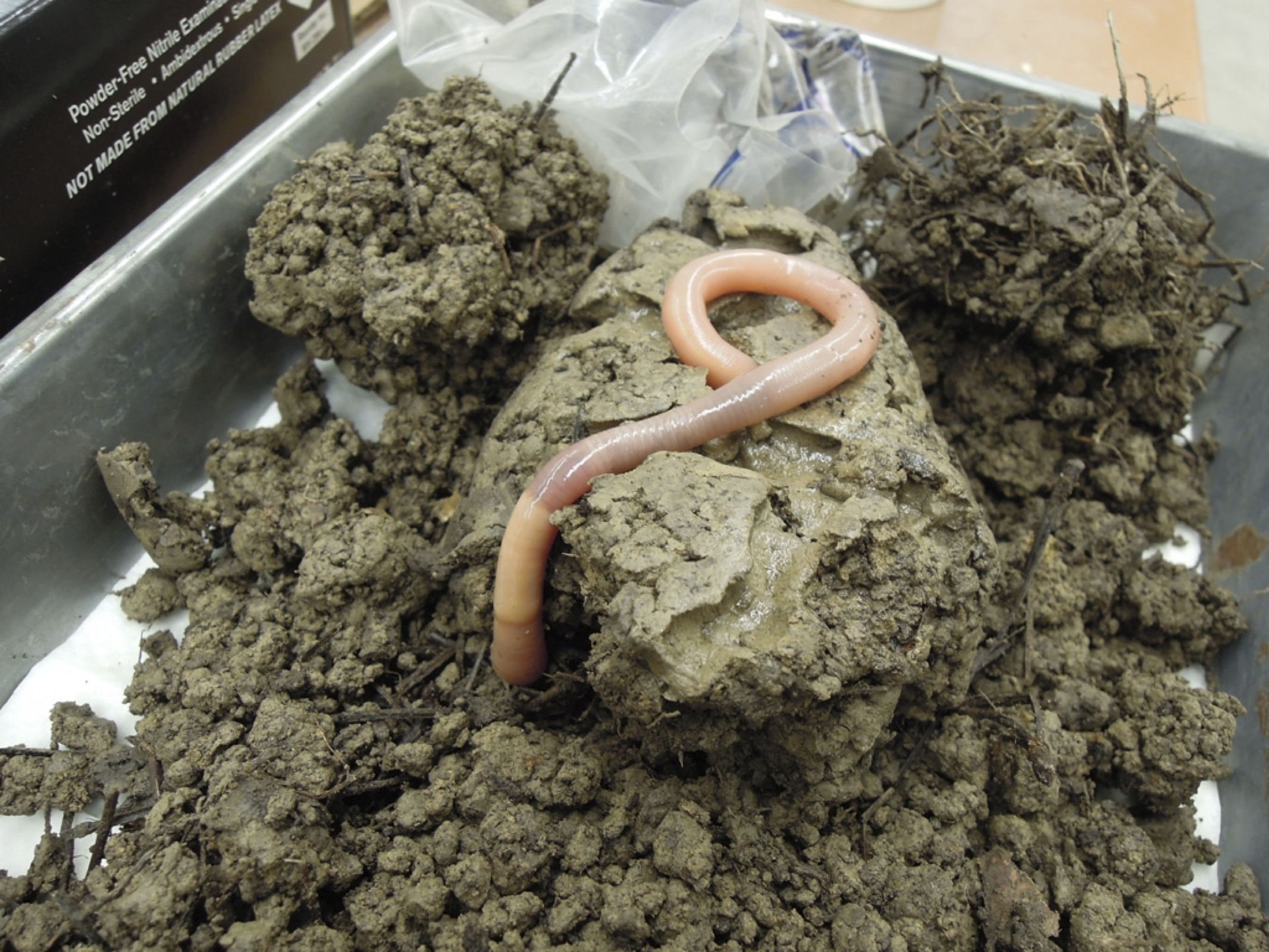

Scientific classification
- Kingdom: Animalia
- Phylum: Annelida
- Clade: Pleistoannelida
- Clade: Sedentaria
- Class: Clitellata
- Order: Opisthopora
- Family: Megascolecidae
- Genus: Driloleirus; Fender & McKey-Fender, 1990

Species
- D. americanus; D. macelfreshi

= Driloleirus =

Genus of annelids

Driloleirus is an earthworm genus in the family Megascolecidae.

This genus includes at least two species:

- Driloleirus americanus – giant Palouse earthworm, Washington giant earthworm
- Driloleirus macelfreshi – Oregon giant earthworm
