= Great antpitta =

Conservation status
- Near Threatened (IUCN 3.1)

Scientific classification
- Kingdom: Animalia
- Phylum: Chordata
- Class: Aves
- Order: Passeriformes
- Family: Grallariidae
- Genus: Grallaria
- Species: G. excelsa

Binomial name
- Grallaria excelsa Berlepsch, 1893

Species of bird

The great antpitta (Grallaria excelsa) is a Near Threatened species of bird in the family Grallariidae. It is endemic to Venezuela.

== Taxonomy and systematics ==
The great antpitta has two subspecies, the nominate G. e. excelsa (Berlepsch, 1893) and G. e. phelpsi (Gilliard, 1939).

The great antpitta and the giant antpitta (G. gigantea) form a superspecies. Some authors have suggested that they are actually conspecific or that subspecies G. e. phelpsi belongs to the giant antpitta.

== Description ==
Grallaria antpittas are a "wonderful group of plump and round antbirds whose feathers are often fluffed up...they have stout bills [and] very short tails". The great antpitta is 22.5 to 28 cm (8.9 to 11 in) long. The sexes have the same plumage. Adults of the nominate subspecies have a brown or olive ochre forecrown and a gray crown and nape with faint black scaling. The rest of their upperparts are olive-brown. They have white lores on an otherwise ochraceous to pale rufous face. They have a white to buffy-white throat with faint black stripes down the sides. Their underparts are mostly ochraceous to pale rufous with wavy black lines that give a scalloped appearance; their undertail coverts are unmarked bright tawny ochre. Subspecies G. s. canicauda has a darker forecrown than the nominate, with ochraceous lores, less white on their chin, and a paler throat and upper breast with wider black lines. Both subspecies have a dark brown iris, a black maxilla, a grayish horn or dusky pinkish mandible, and dark olive-gray to pale olive-brown legs and feet.

== Distribution and habitat ==
The great antpitta has a disjunct distribution. The nominate subspecies is found in western Venezuela in the Serranía del Perijá and south in the Andes from Lara to Táchira. Subspecies G. s. canicauda is known only from three specimens collected in Colonia Tovar, a town in Aragua state in the western Venezuelan Coastal Range. The species inhabits the understory of humid cloudforest. It favors areas along creeks and at the edges of gaps formed by fallen trees. In elevation it ranges between 1,600 and 2,300 m (5,200 and 7,500 ft) but is most common above 2,000 m (6,600 ft).

== Behavior ==
=== Movement ===
The great antpitta is believed to be a year-round resident throughout its range but might make some short elevational movements.

=== Feeding ===
The great antpitta's diet is not known, though worms appear to be a major part of what adults feed to nestlings. It is highly terrestrial while foraging; it hops, pauses, and dashes to capture prey. They seldom fly beyond a short distance or higher than to a low branch. Most observations are of single birds or pairs. They rarely if ever join mixed-species feeding flocks but do opportunistically attend army ant swarms.

=== Breeding ===
The only information about the great antpitta's breeding biology is from a study of three nests found in 2003. The species' breeding season includes at least May and June. The nests were large open cups of moss, rootlets, leaves, and twigs lined with rootlets and fungal rhizomorphs. They were built in masses of epiphytes and branches on the sides of trees between 3.8 and 12 m (12 and 39 ft) above the ground. One nest had two eggs and another had one nestling. Both adults constructed the nests, incubated the eggs, and brooded and provisioned nestlings. The incubation period and time to fledging are not known.

=== Vocalization ===
The great antpitta's song, known only from the nominate subspecies, is "a long (4-6 sec), low-pitched, rubber-lipped trill, br'r'r'r'r'r'r'r'...r'r'r'r'r'ub...with barely perceptible rise in pitch and temp and abrupt ending". It also makes "a low, hollow du-du-du-du". The species mostly sings from dawn into the early morning, mostly in the rainy season between April and November and less frequently during the rest of the year. It sings from a branch or log up to about 4 m (13 ft) above the ground.

== Status ==
The IUCN originally in 1988 assessed the great antpitta as Near Threatened, then in 2000 as Vulnerable, and since 2022 again as Near Threatened. It is known from only a limited number of sites and its estimated population of between 1000 and 2500 mature individuals is believed to be decreasing. "Agricultural colonisation represents a significant threat in the Sierra de Perijá, Cordillera de Mérida and Cordillera de la Costa, and many areas have already been cleared for cultivation, both commercial and subsistence." The species is fairly regularly found in Yacambú National Park, and other protected areas are within its nominal range, but it remains elusive and possibly extirpated in much of that range.
