= Samuel Wooster James =

American biologist

- Other names: SW James, Samuel James
- Known for: Earthworms, phylogenetics, ecology, taxonomy
- Scientific career
- Fields: Biology, zoology, evolutionary biology
- Institutions: University of Iowa, University of Kansas
- Website: Personal page

Samuel James is an American scientist, a researcher specializing in evolutionary biology, focusing on earthworm taxonomy. James, with fellow researchers, has discovered numerous species of annelids, including Diplocardia californiana, Diplocardia woodi, Diplocardia montana, and a new species related to the Giant Palouse earthworm.

Since January 2011, James has been working on phylogenomic investigation of the evolutionary history of Annelida, as part of the WormNet II: Assembling the Tree of Life for Annelida project, along with researchers Christer Erseus and Bronwyn W. Williams. He is currently part of the University of Iowa's Department of Biology, where he is an Associate Adjunct Professor. Prior to the University of Iowa, James was a research associate at the University of Kansas, Biodiversity Institute, from 2003 until 2009.

== List of new species observed ==
Scientific name	Common name	Location	Reference
Amynthas nanrenensis		Taiwan	
Amynthas corticis		Taiwan	
Amynthas monsoonus		Taiwan	
Amynthas huangi		Taiwan	
Amynthas aelianus		Taiwan	
Amynthas chaishanensis		Taiwan	
Amynthas hengchunensis		Taiwan	
Amynthas kaopingensis		Taiwan	
Amynthas ailiaoensis		Taiwan	
Diplocardia hulberti		Kansas	
Diplocardia rugosa		Kansas	

== List of publications ==
=== 1980-1984 ===
- James, S.W. 1982. Effects of fire and soil type on earthworm populations in a tallgrass prairie. Pedobiologia 24:37-40.
- Boucher, D., S.W. James and K.E. Keeler. 1982. The ecology of mutualism. Annual Review of Ecology and Systematics 13:315-347.

=== 1985-1989 ===
- James S.W. (1985). "An unexpected effect of autumn burning on tallgrass prairie". American Midland Naturalist. 114 (2): 400–403. doi:10.2307/2425615. JSTOR 2425615.
- James S.W., Seastedt T.R. (1986). "Nitrogen mineralization by native and introduced earthworms: effects on big bluestem growth". Ecology. 67 (4): 1094–1097. Bibcode:1986Ecol...67.1094J. doi:10.2307/1939833. JSTOR 1939833.
- Seastedt T.R., Todd T.C., James S.W. (1987). "Experimental manipulations of the arthropod, nematode and earthworm communities in a North American tallgrass prairie". Pedobiologia. 30 (1): 9–17. Bibcode:1987Pedob..30....9S. doi:10.1016/S0031-4056(23)00351-7. S2CID 89151688.
- James S.W. (1988). "Diplocardia hulberti and D. rugosa, new earthworms (Annelida: Oligochaeta: Megascolecidae) from Kansas". Proceedings of the Biological Society of Washington. 101: 300–307.
- James S.W. (1988). "The postfire environment and earthworm populations in tallgrass prairie". Ecology. 69 (2): 476–483. Bibcode:1988Ecol...69..476J. doi:10.2307/1940446. JSTOR 1940446.
- Seastedt, T.R., S.W. James and T.C. Todd. 1989 Interactions among soil invertebrates, microbes and plant growth in the tallgrass prairie. Agriculture, Ecosystems and Environment 24:219-228.
- James S.W., Cunningham M.R. (1989). "Feeding ecology of some earthworms in Kansas tallgrass prairie". American Midland Naturalist. 121 (1): 78–83. doi:10.2307/2425658. JSTOR 2425658.

=== 1990-1994 ===
- James S.W. (1990). "Diplocardia kansensis, a new earthworm from Kansas, with redescriptions of Diplocardia rip aria Smith and D. fuscula Gates (Annelida: Oligochaeta: Megascolecidae)". Proceedings of the Biological Society of Washington. 103: 179–186.
- James S.W. (1990). "Diplotrema murchiei and D. papillata, new earthworms (Oligochaeta: Megascolecidae) from Mexico". Acta Zoológica Mexicana. 38 (38): 18–27. doi:10.21829/azm.1990.37381768. S2CID 81396592.
- James S.W. (1990). "Martiodrilus olivaceous and M. panamensis, new earthworms from Colombia and Panama. (Oligochaeta: Glossoscolecidae)". Zoologica Scripta. 19 (3): 305–308. doi:10.1111/j.1463-6409.1990.tb00260.x. S2CID 84943848.
- James, S.W. 1990. Oligochaeta: Megascolecidae and other earthworms from southern and midwestern North America. In D. Dindal (ed.) Soil Biology Guide. pp. 379–386. John Wiley and Sons, New York.
- James S.W. (1991). "Soil, organic matter, nitrogen, and phosphorus processing by native and introduced earthworm species in tallgrass prairie". Ecology. 72 (6): 2101–2109. doi:10.2307/1941562. JSTOR 1941562.
- James S.W. (1991). "New species of earthworms from Puerto Rico, with a redefinition of the earthworm genus Trigaster. (Annelida: Oligochaeta: Megascolecidae)". Transactions of the American Microscopical Society. 110 (4): 337–353. doi:10.2307/3226771. JSTOR 3226771.
- James S.W. (1992). "Experimental and seasonal variation in population structure of earthworms in tallgrass prairie". Soil Biology and Biochemistry. 24: 1445–1449. doi:10.1016/0038-0717(92)90131-g.
- James S.W. (1992). "Localized dynamics of earthworm populations in relation to bison dung in North American tallgrass prairie". Soil Biology and Biochemistry. 24 (12): 1471–1476. Bibcode:1992SBiBi..24.1471J. doi:10.1016/0038-0717(92)90135-k.
- Todd T.C., James S.W., Seastedt T.R. (1992). "Soil invertebrate and plant responses to mowing and carbofuran application in a North American tallgrass prairie". Plant and Soil. 144 (1): 117–124. Bibcode:1992PlSoi.144..117T. doi:10.1007/bf00018852. S2CID 2797654.
- Wood, H.B. and S.W. James. 1993. Native and introduced earthworms from selected chaparral, woodland, and riparian zones in southern California. Gen.Tech. Rep. PSW-GTR-142. Albany, CA: Pacific Southwest Research Station, Forest Service, USDA; 20 p.
- James S.W. (1994). "New acanthodriline earthworms from southern Mexico (Oligochaeta: Megascolecidae)". Acta Zoológica Mexicana. 60: 1–21.
- James S.W. (1994). "New species of Diplocardia and Argilophilus (Annelida: Oligochaeta: Megascolecidae) from southern California". Proceedings of the Biological Society of Washington. 107: 622–633.
- Hendrix P.F., Callaham Jr M.A., James S.W. (1994). "Ecology of nearctic earthworms in the southern USA. I. Characteristics of Diplocardia longa (Oligochaeta: Megascolecidae) surface casts in grass, hardwood and pine microhabitats on the lower piedmont of Georgia". Megadrilogica. 5: 45–51.

=== 1995-1999 ===
- Fragoso, C., S.W. James and S. Borges. 1995. Native earthworms of the north Neotropical region: current status and controversies. in P. Hendrix (ed.). Earthworm Ecology and Biogeography in North America, pp. 67–115. CRC Press, Inc, Boca Raton, Florida.
- James, S.W. 1995. Systematics, biogeography and ecology of earthworms from eastern, central, southern and southwestern USA. in P. Hendrix (ed.) Earthworm Ecology and Biogeography in North America, pp. 29–51. CRC Press, Inc, Boca Raton, Florida.
- James, S.W. 1996. Nine new species of Dichogaster from Guadeloupe, French West Indies (Oligochaeta, Megascolecidae) Zoologica Scripta 25:21-24.
- James, S.W. 1996. Earthworms. In G. Hall (ed.) Methods for the examination of organismal diversity in soils and sediments. IUBS Methodology Series. CAB International, Wallingford, Oxon, UK.
- Goodman, S.M., P. Parillo, S.W. James and P. Sierwald. 1996. Elevational variation in soil macroinvertebrates on the eastern slopes of the Reserve Naturelle Integrale d'Andingitra, Madagascar. Fieldiana (Zoology) NS. 85:144-151
- Wood H.B, Olivier K.L., James S.W. (1997). "Relict Megascolecidae and exclusion of Lumbricidae from basalt-derived soils in Southern California". Soil Biology and Biochemistry. 29 (3–4): 241–244. Bibcode:1997SBiBi..29..241W. doi:10.1016/s0038-0717(96)00089-2.
- James, S.W. 1998. Earthworms and earth history. pp. 3–14 in: C.A. Edwards, ed. Earthworm Ecology. Proc 5th International Symposium on Earthworm Ecology. St. Lucie Press, Boca Raton.
- Hendrix P.F, Callaham Jr M.A., Lachnicht S.L., Blair J.M., James S.W., Zou X. (1999). "Stable isotopic studies of resource utilization by nearctic earthworms (Diplocardia, Oligochaeta) in subtropical savanna and forest ecosystems". Pedobiologia. 43 (6): 818–823. Bibcode:1999Pedob..43..818H. doi:10.1016/S0031-4056(24)00617-6.

=== 2000-2004 ===
- James, S.W. 2000. Earthworms of the eastern Columbia River Basin. USDA- Forest Service General Technical Report, Pacific NW Region.
- Joshi R.C., Matchoc O.R., Cabigat J.C., James S.W. (2000). "Survey of the earthworms in the Ifugao rice terraces, Philippines". Journal of Environmental Science and Management. 2 (2): 1–12.
- Hong Y., James S. W. (2001). "Five new earthworms of the genus Amynthas Kinberg (Megascolecidae) with four pairs of spermathecae". Zoological Studies. 40 (4): 269–275.
- Hong Y., James S. W. (2001). "New species of Korean Amynthas Kinberg 1867 (Oligochaeta, Megascolecidae) with two pairs of spermathecae". Revue suisse de Zoologie. 108 (1): 65–93. doi:10.5962/bhl.part.79621.
- Jamieson B.G.M., Tillier S., Tillier A., Justine J-L., Ling E., James S., McDonald K., Hugall A.F. (2002). "Phylogeny of the Megascolecidae (Oligochaeta, Annelida): combined versus partitioned analysis using nuclear (28s) and mitochondrial (12s, 16s) rDNA". Zoosystema. 24 (4): 707–734.
- James S.W. (2004). "An illustrated key to the earthworms of the Samoan Archipelago". Micronesica. 37: 1–13.
- James, S.W. 2004. Earthworms from the eastern mountains of Jamaica: fourteen new species of Dichogaster (Oligochaeta: Megascolecidae). (in press, Organisms, Diversity and Evolution)
- James, S.W. 2004. New species of Amynthas, Pheretima, and Pleionogaster (Clitellata: Megascolecidae) of the Mt. Kitanglad Range, Mindanao Island, Philippines. (in press, Raffles Bulletin of Zoology).
- James S.W. 2004. The earthworm genus Pleionogaster in southern Luzon, Philippines. (in prep).
- James, S.W., Y. Hong and T.H. Kim. 2004. New species of Pheretima and Pithemera (Oligochaeta: Megascolecidae) from Mt. Arayat, Luzon Island, Philippines. (in press, Revue suisse de Zoologie)
- Hong, Y. and S.W. James 2004. New species of Amynthas Kinberg, 1867 from the Philippines (Oligochaeta: Megascolecidae). (in press, Revue suisse de Zoologie)
- James, S.W. 2004. New genera and new species of earthworms (Clitellata: Megascolecidae) from southern Luzon, Philippines. (in press, Systematics and Biodiversity)
- James, S.W. 2004. New species of Archipheretima (Clitellata: Megascolecidae) from Luzon, Philippines, with a revision of the genus. (in prep.)
- James, S.W., H.-T. Shih and H.-W. Chang. 2004. Seven new species of Amynthas (Clitellata: Megascolecidae) and new earthworm records from Taiwan. Journal of Natural History. (in press).
- James, S.W. 2004. Planetary processes and their interactions with earthworm and distributions and ecology. in: C.A. Edwards, ed. Earthworm Ecology. 2nd edition. St. Lucie Press, Boca Raton. (in press)
- James, S.W. and P.W. Hendrix. 2004. Invasion of Exotic Earthworms into North America. in: C.A. Edwards, ed. Earthworm Ecology. 2nd edition. St. Lucie Press, Boca Raton. (in press)

=== 2005-2009 ===
- Samuel James, Hsi-Te Shih, Hsueh-Wen Chang. 2005. Seven new species of Amynthas Clitellata: Megascolecidae and new earthworm records from Taiwan Journal of Natural History, Vol. 39, No. 14., 1007, doi:10.1080/00222930400001434
- James, S. W. and G. G. Brown. 2006. Earthworm ecology and diversity in Brazil. p. 56–116. In: Moreira, F. M. S., J. O. Siqueira, and L. Brussaard. (eds.). Soil biodiversity in Amazonian and other Brazilian ecosystems. CAB International, Wallingford.

=== 2010-2014 ===
- Lang, S. A., Garcia, M. V., James, S. W., Sayers, C. W., & Shain, D. H. (2012). Phylogeny and clitellar morphology of the giant Amazonian Earthworm, Rhinodrilus priollii (Oligochaeta: Glossoscolecidae). The American Midland Naturalist, 167(2), 384–395.
