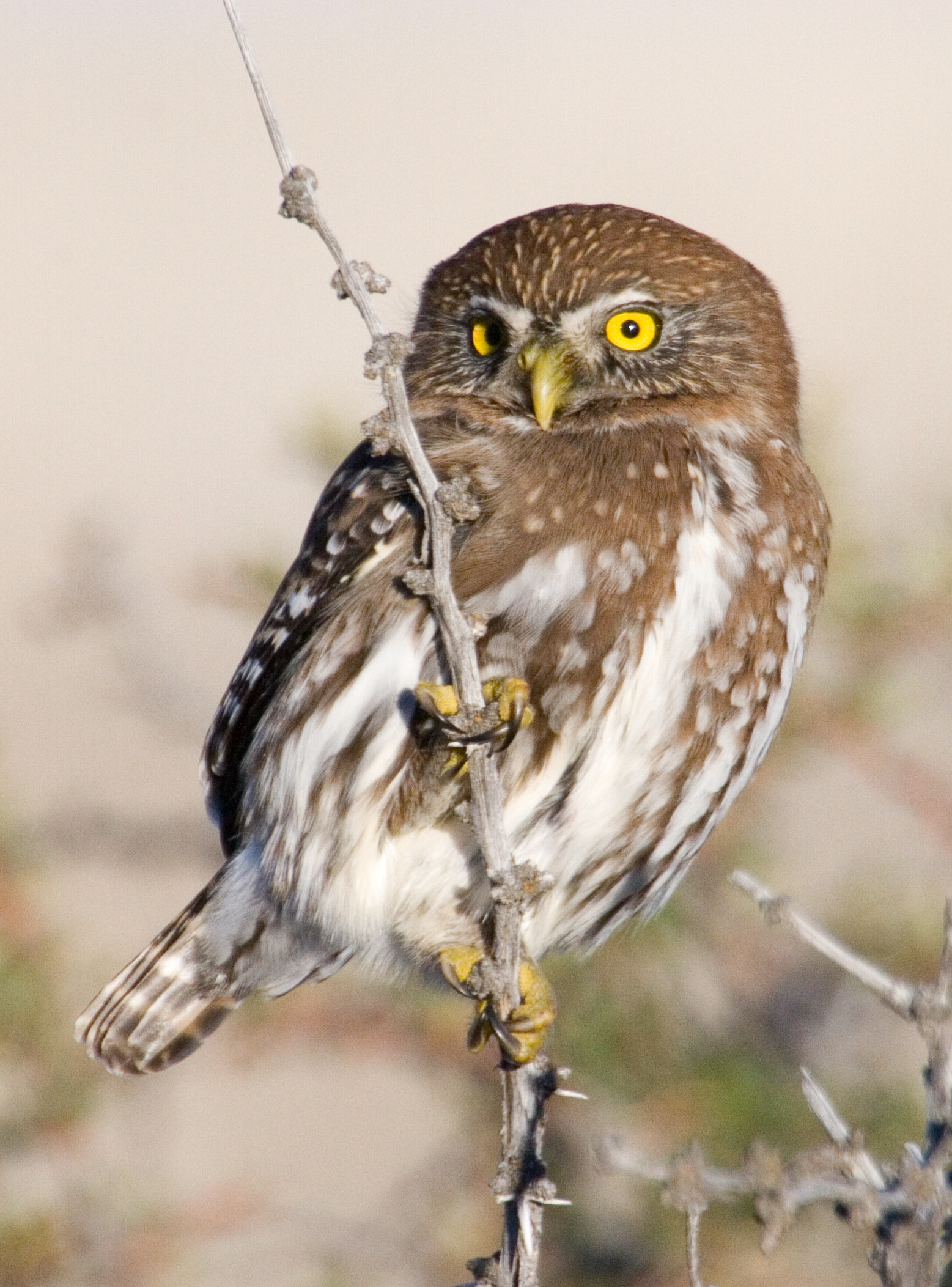

Conservation status
- Least Concern (IUCN 3.1)
- CITES Appendix II

Scientific classification
- Kingdom: Animalia
- Phylum: Chordata
- Class: Aves
- Order: Strigiformes
- Family: Strigidae
- Genus: Glaucidium
- Species: G. nana

Binomial name
- Glaucidium nana (King, 1827)
- Distribution of austral pygmy owl Resident

= Austral pygmy owl =

Species of owl

The austral pygmy owl (Glaucidium nana) is a species of owl in the family Strigidae. It is found mainly in central and southern Chile, but also in some parts of southern Argentina.

== Taxonomy and systematics ==
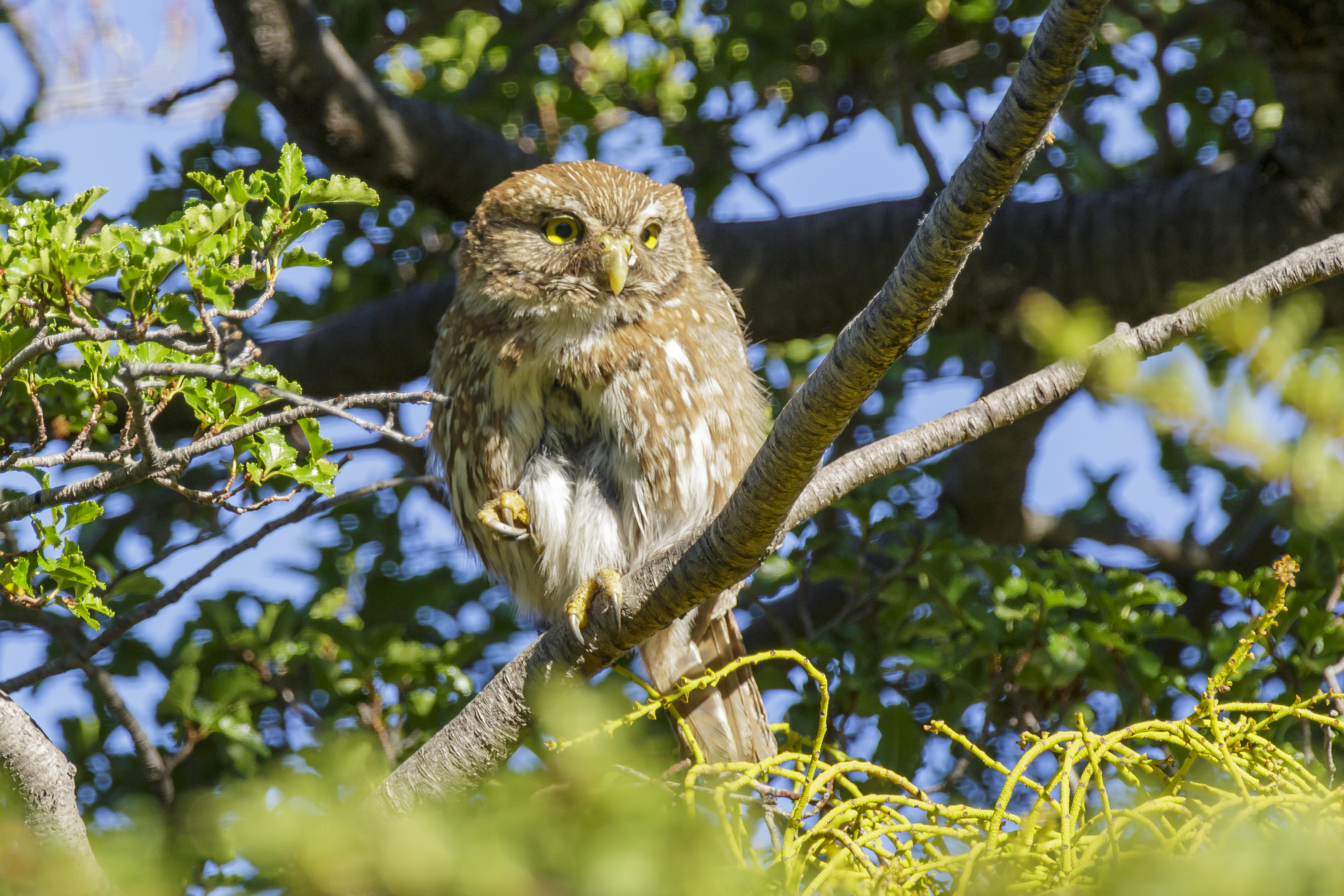
Austral Pygmy Owl at Torres del Paine National Park

The austral pygmy owl has sometimes been treated as a subspecies of ferruginous pygmy owl (Glaucidium brasilianum) but DNA studies and other data support its being a species in its own right. It is monotypic.

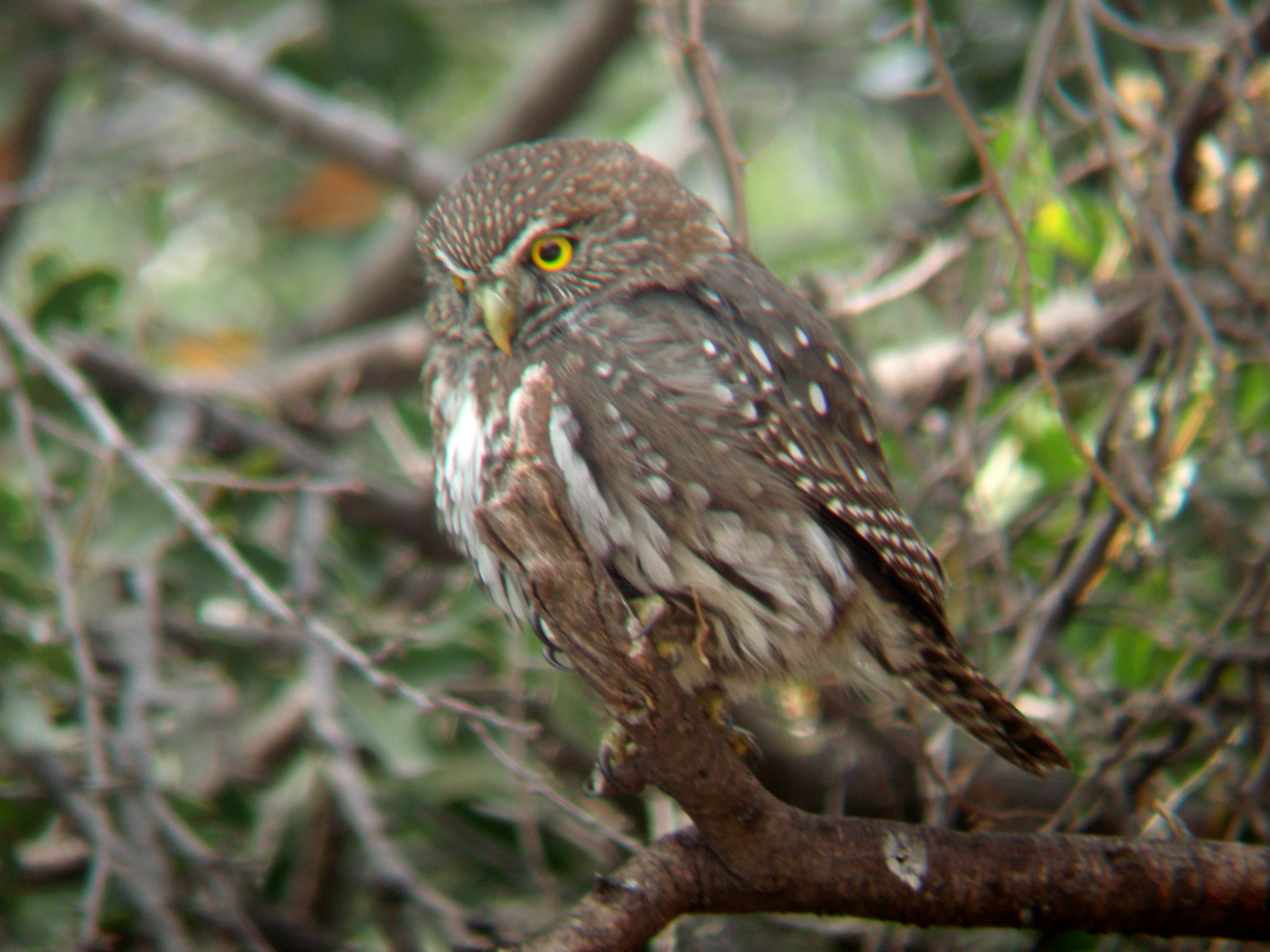
Austral pygmy owl at Rio de Cipreses Natural Reserve, central Chile

== Description ==
The austral pygmy owl is 17 to 21 cm (6.7 to 8.3 in) long. Males weigh 56 to 75 g (2.0 to 2.6 oz) and females 70 to 100 g (2.5 to 3.5 oz). It has gray-brown and red morphs and intergrades between them. Adults of both morphs have a pale grayish brown face with dark flecks, whitish "brows" over pale yellow eyes, and black "false eyes" on the nape. The gray-brown morph's upperparts are dark grayish brown with whitish dots of variable size and shape. The tail is also dark grayish brown with narrow buffy bars. The throat is white, the sides of the upper breast dark grayish brown, and the underparts off-white with dark grayish brown streaks. The red morph has a similar pattern but reddish brown replaces the dark grayish brown.

== Distribution and habitat ==
The austral pygmy owl is found from approximately Valparaíso Province in Chile and Neuquén Province in western Argentina south to the tip of Tierra del Fuego. In Chile it ranges in elevation from sea level to 2,000 m (6,600 ft). It inhabits a variety of landscapes from city parks and farmland with scattered trees to deciduous forests and thickets, evergreen shrublands, temperate and southern beech (Nothofagus) forests, and Patagonian scrub/steppe.

== Behavior ==
=== Feeding ===
The austral pygmy owl is primarily diurnal but is also active at night. It is a solitary hunter that sallies from perches to capture insects, birds, mammals, and reptiles. It has been documented taking birds almost double its own weight.

=== Breeding ===
The austral pygmy owl usually nests in a tree cavity but has also been documented using holes in earthen banks. They lay a clutch of three to five eggs between September and November, and the female alone incubates them.

=== Vocalization ===
The austral pygmy owl has five primary vocalizations. Pairs maintain contact with "a whistle with 6 to 7 notes/sec described as huj-huj-huj-huj-huj-huj". Their territorial call is "a sharp trill described as truie-truie-yi-yi". Nestlings make "soft metallic chirps trigigigirrr or trigigick". Both sexes make a courtship call, "a whistle...described as tiririi-tiririi, and an undefined call rendered as diud or diuh".

== Status ==
The IUCN has assessed the austral pygmy owl as being of Least Concern. Though its population has not been quantified, the species is "reported to be the most abundant owl in Chile". In agricultural areas it is persecuted because its nocturnal calls are interpreted as an ill omen.
