= Rhinodrilus =

Scientific classification
- Kingdom: Animalia
- Phylum: Annelida
- Clade: Pleistoannelida
- Clade: Sedentaria
- Class: Clitellata
- Order: Haplotaxida
- Family: Rhinodrilidae
- Genus: Rhinodrilus; Perrier, 1872

Type species
- Rhinodrilus paradoxus Perrier, 1872

Species
- Subgenus Rhinodrilus (Rhinodrilus) Perrier, 1872; Rhinodrilus brasiliensis (Benham, 1886); Rhinodrilus brunneus (Michaelsen, 1892); Rhinodrilus horsti (Beddard, 1892); Rhinodrilus papillifer (Michaelsen, 1892); Rhinodrilus paradoxus Perrier, 1872; Rhinodrilus paraguayensis (Rosa, 1895); Rhinodrilus parvus (Rosa, 1895); Rhinodrilus sibateensis (Michaelsen, 1900); Rhinodrilus annulatus Černosvitov, 1934; Rhinodrilus antonioi Hernández-García & Sousa, in Sousa et al, 2020; Rhinodrilus callichaetus (Michaelsen, 1892); Rhinodrilus distinctus (Ude, 1893); Rhinodrilus longus Černosvitov, 1934

Synonyms
- Rhynodrylus (lapsus)

Genus of annelids

Rhinodrilus is a genus of large South American earthworms. It belongs to the family Rhinodrilidae.

This genus consists of the following species

- Rhinodrilus alatus
- Rhinodrilus annulatus
- Rhinodrilus appuni
  - Rhinodrilus appuni appuni
  - Rhinodrilus appuni pavoni
- Rhinodrilus brasiliensis
- Rhinodrilus bursiferus
- Rhinodrilus contortus
- Rhinodrilus duseni
- Rhinodrilus fafner (possibly extinct)
- Rhinodrilus garbei
- Rhinodrilus hoeflingae
- Rhinodrilus horsti
- Rhinodrilus juncundus
- Rhinodrilus lakei
- Rhinodrilus papillifer
- Rhinodrilus paradoxus
- Rhinodrilus pitun
- Rhinodrilus priollii
- Rhinodrilus romani
