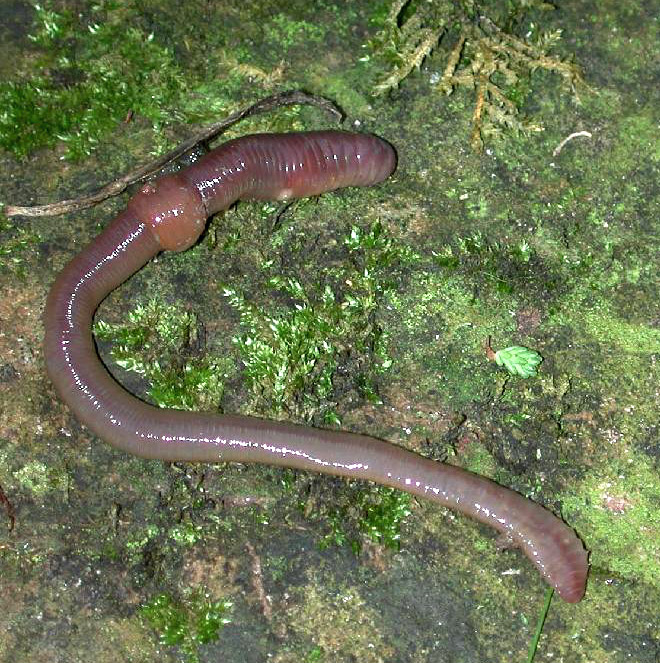
- Lumbricus terrestris, the common European earthworm

Scientific classification
- Domain: Eukaryota
- Kingdom: Animalia
- Phylum: Annelida
- Clade: Pleistoannelida
- Clade: Sedentaria
- Class: Clitellata
- Order: Opisthopora
- Family: Lumbricidae
- Genus: Lumbricus; Linnaeus, 1758

Type species
- Lumbricus terrestris Linnaeus, 1758

Species
- Lumbricus badensis; Lumbricus baicalensis; Lumbricus castaneus; Lumbricus centralis; Lumbricus festivus; Lumbricus friendi; Lumbricus herculeus; Lumbricus improvisus; Lumbricus klarae; Lumbricus meliboeus; Lumbricus polyphemus; Lumbricus rubellus; Lumbricus terrestris; Lumbricus variegatus

= Lumbricus =

Genus of annelid worms

The genus Lumbricus contains some of the most commonly seen earthworms in Europe among its nearly 700 valid species.

Characteristics of some commonly encountered species are:

- Lumbricus rubellus is usually reddish brown or reddish violet, iridescent dorsally, and pale yellow ventrally. They are usually about 25–105 mm in length, and have around 95-120 segments.
- Lumbricus castaneus varies from chesnut to violet brown; brown or yellow ventrally, and has an orange clitellum. They are usually about 30–70 mm long, and have around 82–100 segments.
- Lumbricus terrestris has several common names, including common earthworm, nightcrawler, and dew worm. It is strongly pigmented, brown-red dorsally, and yellowish ventrally. Setae are widely paired at both ends of the body. It is about 90–300 mm long, and has around 110–160 segments.
- Lumbricus festivus is not found in large numbers. It is red-brown, lighter ventrally, iridescent dorsally. The body length varies from 48 to 108 mm, with about 100–143 segments.
- Lumbricus badensis, the giant earthworm, also belongs to this genus. Its range is restricted to the Black Forest area of southwestern Germany. It is very large and grows up to 600mm.

== See also ==
- Earthworm
