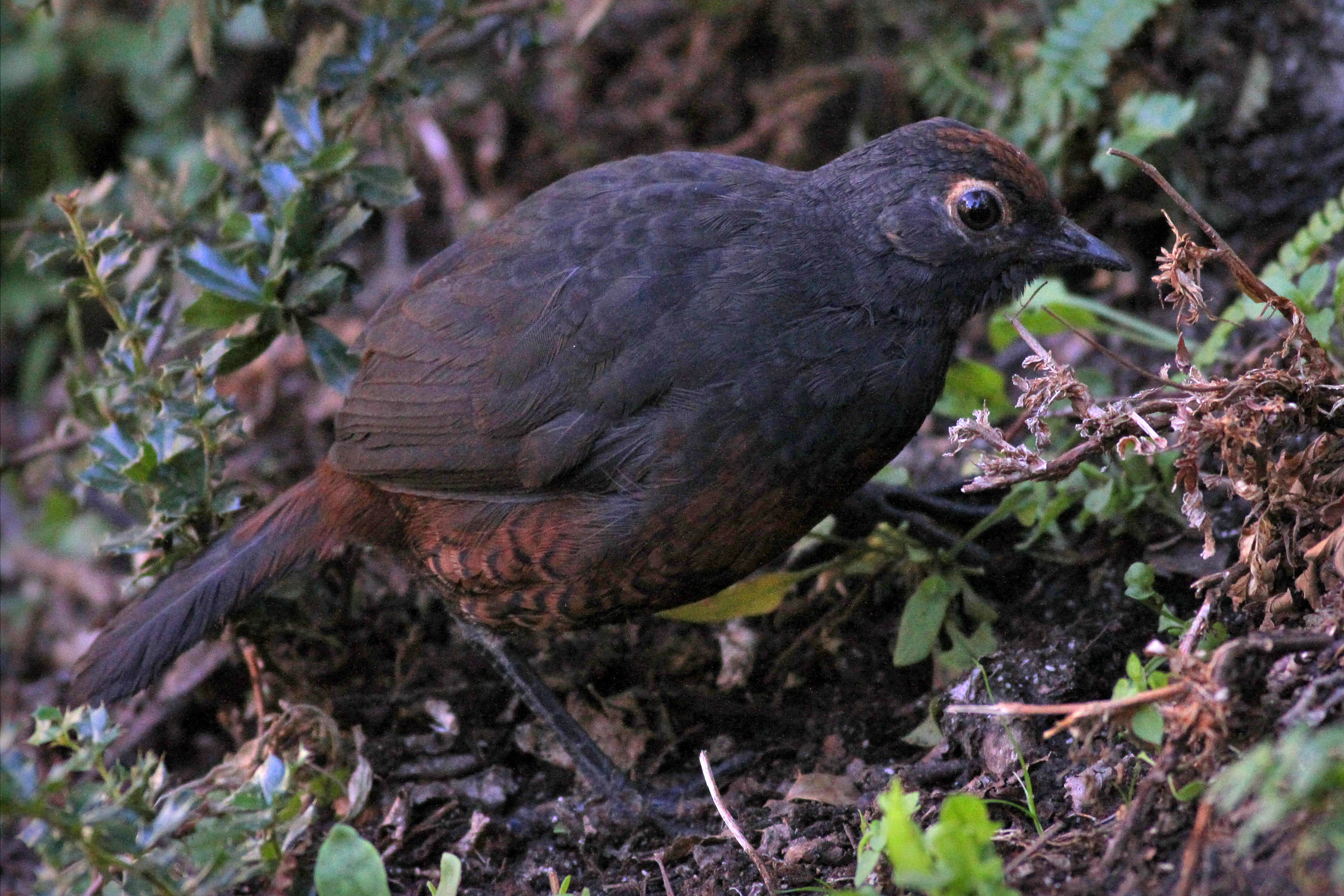

Conservation status
- Least Concern (IUCN 3.1)

Scientific classification
- Kingdom: Animalia
- Phylum: Chordata
- Class: Aves
- Order: Passeriformes
- Family: Rhinocryptidae
- Genus: Pteroptochos
- Species: P. tarnii

Binomial name
- Pteroptochos tarnii (King, 1831)

= Black-throated huet-huet =

Species of bird

The black-throated huet-huet Spanish pronunciation: [wet wet] (Pteroptochos tarnii) is a species of bird in the family Rhinocryptidae. It is found in southern/central Chile and adjacent western Argentina. Its natural habitat is temperate forest.

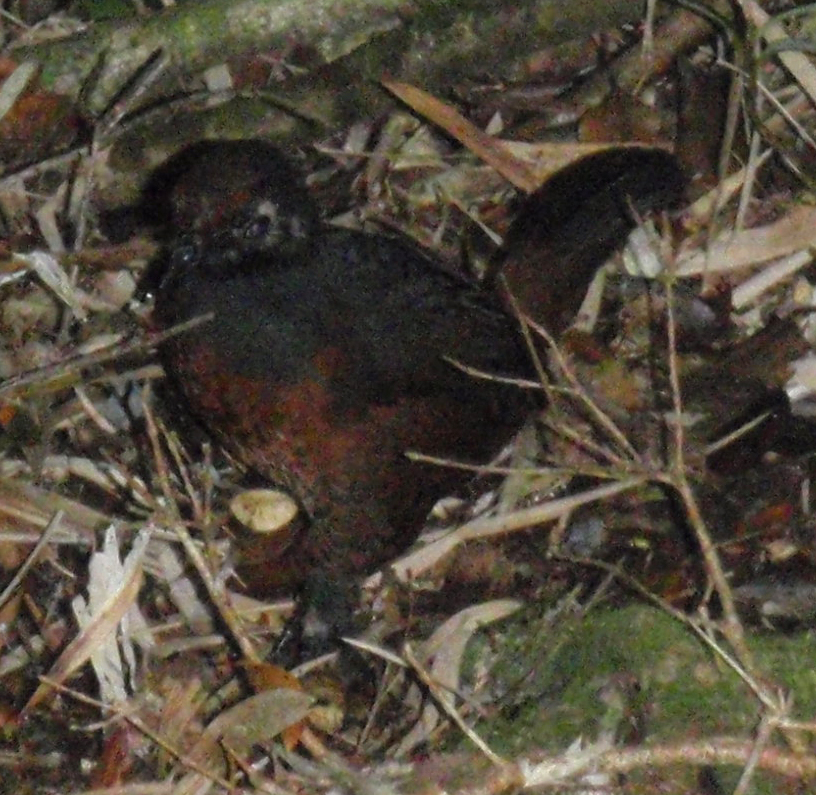
Chiloé National Park near Cucao, Chile
