= Oregon giant earthworm =

Conservation status
- Endangered (IUCN 3.1)

- Critically Imperiled (NatureServe)

Scientific classification
- Kingdom: Animalia
- Phylum: Annelida
- Clade: Pleistoannelida
- Clade: Sedentaria
- Class: Clitellata
- Order: Opisthopora
- Family: Megascolecidae
- Genus: Driloleirus
- Species: D. macelfreshi

Binomial name
- Driloleirus macelfreshi (F. Smith, 1937)

Species of annelid

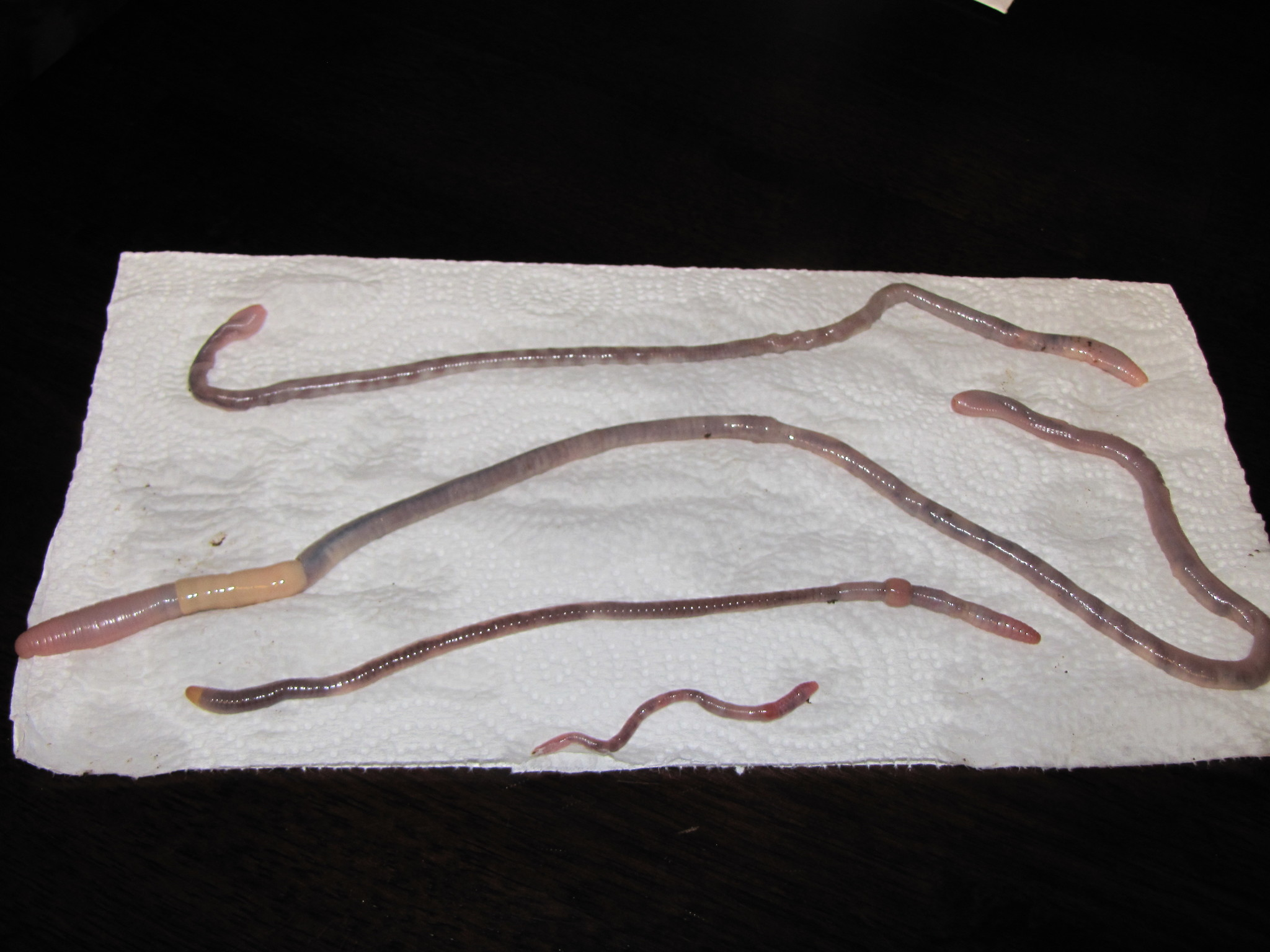
Driloleirus macelfreshi

The Oregon giant earthworm (Driloleirus macelfreshi) is one of the largest earthworms found in North America, growing to more than three feet (0.91 m) in length. First described in 1937, the species is not common. Since its discovery, specimens have been documented in only fifteen locations within Oregon's Willamette Valley.

== Taxonomy and description ==
The Oregon giant earthworm was first described by Frank Smith in 1937 from a specimen found near Salem, Oregon in 1903. The species was named in honor of its collector, F. M. McElfresh. Like its cousin, the giant Palouse earthworm (Driloleirus americanus) of Washington, this species can grow to lengths in excess of 3 feet (0.91 m) and up to an inch (2.5 cm) in width. When handled, the worms emit a peculiar aroma that is reminiscent of flowers—hence their genus name Driloleirus, which means "lily-like worm".

The life history of this species is not well understood and is based on a very limited number of observations. They live in the deep, moist, undisturbed soils of riparian forests. They tunnel deep into the soil and are known to dig permanent burrows fifteen feet below the surface. However, during the wetter seasons, they are found closer to the soil surface feeding on the rich layers of accumulated organic material.

== Distribution and habitat ==
The Oregon giant earthworm is endemic to Oregon and has been found at 15 sites in the Willamette Valley and one additional site within the Oregon Coast Range. Like Oregon's other indigenous worms, this species has a narrow range of tolerance for soil conditions, favoring fine textured soils rich in clay. It appears to prefer well drained soils (fine-grained, clay to silt loams) that are near subsurface water, often where the water table is reachable but the soil is not waterlogged. This species is associated with deep, little-disturbed soils in moist mixed forest of Douglas firs, grand firs, and bigleaf maples and is also known from pure Douglas-fir woodlots and occasionally from oak-ash woods. It is apparently tolerant of the acidic soil found under coniferous forests.

== Conservation status ==
Because this species is so elusive, being last sighted in 2008, it is very difficult to estimate populations or assess potential threats. Habitat loss and competition from introduced earthworms are thought to be two major threats. In the Willamette Valley, less than one percent of the original native grasslands remain, and conversion of land for agriculture, industry, and housing development has eliminated much of this species' suitable habitat.
