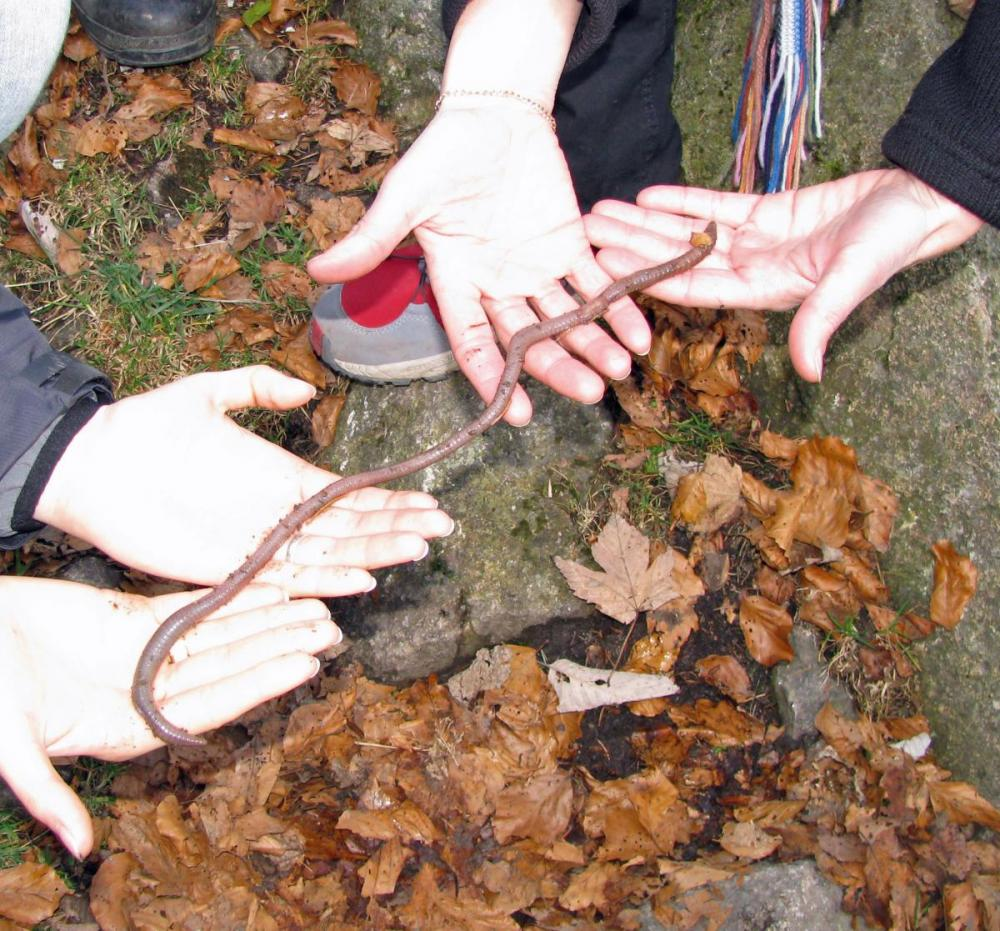

Conservation status
- Data Deficient (IUCN 3.1)

Scientific classification
- Kingdom: Animalia
- Phylum: Annelida
- Clade: Pleistoannelida
- Clade: Sedentaria
- Class: Clitellata
- Order: Opisthopora
- Family: Lumbricidae
- Genus: Lumbricus
- Species: L. badensis

Binomial name
- Lumbricus badensis Michaelsen, 1907

= Lumbricus badensis =

Species of annelid worm

Lumbricus badensis is a type of giant earthworm, a species of annelid. It is endemic to the upper-elevation spruce forests of Germany's Black Forest, where its common name is Badischer Riesenregenwurm ("giant rainworm of Baden"). It inhabits exclusively the region between the mountains Feldberg and Belchen, and the Wiese Valley at elevations above 1000 m. Up to 60 cm in length, this earthworm is one of the largest European species. It weighs between 25 and 35 g and lives in subterranean tubes which are up to 2.5 m deep. It feeds on organic matter it ingests from the surface and aerates the soil as it moves through it, contributing to the formation of humus. It is prey for foxes and owls. An informational trail about this giant earthworm, the Riesenregenwurm-Erlebnispfad, has been established on Belchen mountain.
