= Giant Palouse earthworm =

Conservation status
- Vulnerable (IUCN 3.1)

- Critically Imperiled (NatureServe)

Scientific classification
- Kingdom: Animalia
- Phylum: Annelida
- Clade: Pleistoannelida
- Clade: Sedentaria
- Class: Clitellata
- Order: Opisthopora
- Family: Megascolecidae
- Genus: Driloleirus
- Species: D. americanus

Binomial name
- Driloleirus americanus Smith, 1897

Species of annelid worm

The giant Palouse earthworm or Washington giant earthworm (Driloleirus americanus, meaning lily-like worm) is a species of earthworm belonging to the genus Driloleirus inhabiting the Palouse region of Eastern Washington and North Idaho, in the United States. The worm was discovered in 1897 by Frank Smith near Pullman, Washington. It can burrow to a depth of 15 feet (4.6 m).

Although it had been thought to be extinct in the 1980s, recent evidence has demonstrated that the species is still living. The latest sighting included recovery of two specimens, an adult and a juvenile, which were unearthed on March 27, 2010 by scientists at the University of Idaho including Samuel James.

== Biology ==
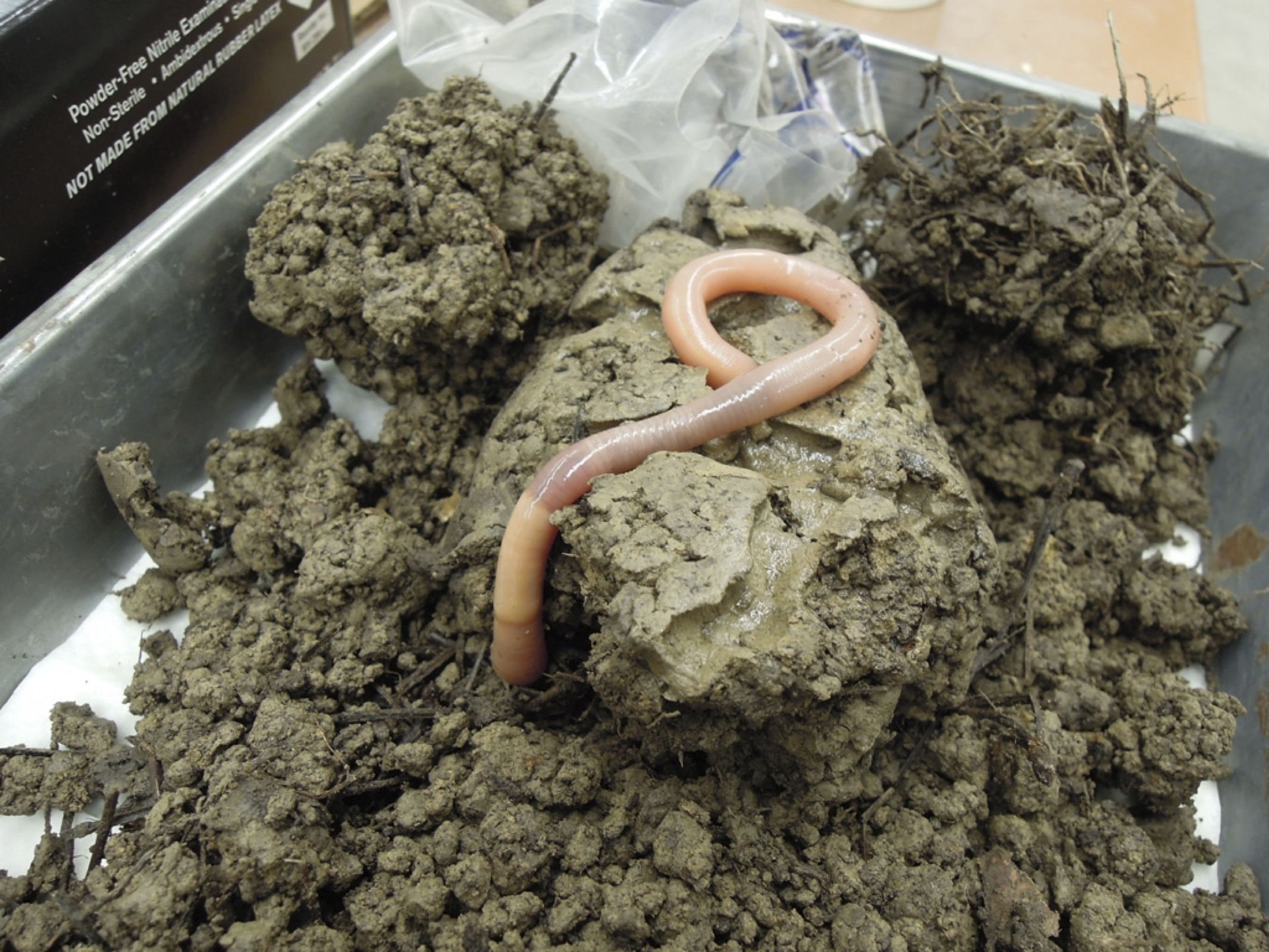
An adult specimen.

Little is known about the giant Palouse earthworm. Typical adult specimens are about 8 in (20 cm) in length. They are related to a species in Australia that is a true giant at 3.3 ft (1.0 m), the giant Gippsland earthworm. The worm is albino in appearance. Prior to its rediscovery in 2010, the worm was believed to give off a scent similar to that of the lily flower when handled and that it was able to spit in self-defense; however, the specimens captured did not exhibit these capabilities. Such nature of burrowing for Giant Palouse Earthworm was recorded to a depth of as much as 15 feet, and it is said to aestivate during dry seasons. Continued existence was confirmed through recent sightings, including recovery of specimens in 2010 and 2012 after it had been declared extinct in the 1980s. It is considered vulnerable because of habitat loss and competition from non-native species.

This species' native habitat consists of the bunch grass prairies of the Palouse region. The fertile soil consists of deep loess hills enriched with volcanic ash and rich layers of organic matter. It is thought to sustain the earthworm during dry seasons. The earthworm burrows deep during summer droughts and enters a state of aestivation.

== Research ==
It had been described as "very common" in the Palouse region in the 1890s, according to an 1897 article in The American Naturalist by Frank Smith. Smith's work was based on four specimens sent to him by R. W. Doane of Washington State University. A scanned image of the letter accompanying the original specimens is found Letter to Frank Smith from R.W. Doane 1897.

There was no scientific survey conducted in the late 19th century to determine the spatial extent and abundance of the earthworm.

A summer 2009 project was launched by Jodi Johnson-Maynard, a University of Idaho associate professor and a soil ecologist specializing in macroinvertebrates, to find specimens. Only four sightings had been confirmed (prior to the 2010 discovery) in the past 30 years, the previous most recent sighting was in 2005 by one of Johnson-Maynard's students, Yaniria Sánchez de León. Funding was provided through various contracts with the Idaho Conservation Data Center in the Idaho Department of Fish and Game and in cooperation with the Washington Department of Fish and Wildlife.

In 2012, two specimens were found near Paradise Ridge, south of Moscow, Idaho, one by Cass Davis (on April 13) and one by Joseph Szasz (on June 5). Both were transferred to the University of Idaho.

== Conservation status ==
As of 2001, the World Conservation Union (IUCN) has considered the giant Palouse earthworm vulnerable due to loss of habitat and competition from non-native species. In August 2006, conservationists petitioned the U.S. government to list the worm under the Endangered Species Act. However, in October 2007, the U.S. Fish and Wildlife Service (FWS) declined to list the species as protected under the Endangered Species Act (ESA), citing a lack of scientific information on which to base a decision to list. This determination prompted a number of environmental organizations to sue the agency for violation of the ESA and Administrative Procedure Act in order "to ensure the vanishing giant earthworm receives the protection it deserves." However, on February 12, 2009, the U.S. District Court for the Eastern District of Washington upheld the decision of the USFWS, finding the FWS's determination "that an organization's request for listing the giant Palouse earthworm (Driloleirus americanus) (GPE) as a threatened or endangered species under the Endangered Species Act was not supported by substantial information was a reasonable determination where the organization had to rely almost entirely upon circumstantial evidence. At each point along the analytical path, whether considering the extent of the GPE's habitat, its population, or potential threats to its existence, the FWS provided a rational basis for declining to draw the inferences sought by the organization."

On 1 July 2009, several environmental organizations filed a new petition to again list the giant Palouse earthworm as endangered or threatened. On 26 July 2011, the FWS announced a decision in the Federal Register that it had again declined to list the earthworm under the Endangered Species Act as "the threats are not of sufficient imminence, intensity, or magnitude to indicate that the GPE is in danger of extinction (endangered), or likely to become endangered within the foreseeable future (threatened), throughout all of its range."

== See also ==
- Giant Gippsland earthworm
- Oregon giant earthworm
