= Dilong (disambiguation) =

Dilong is a Chinese dragon name that is also used to mean "earthworm".

Dilong or Di Long may also refer to:

- Di Long (extract), a "Lumbricus rubellus earthworm" preparation in traditional Chinese medicine
- Dilong paradoxus, a genus and species of small proceratosaurid tyrannosauroid dinosaur
- Dilong (Mokokchung), a ward in Mokokchung, Nagaland, India
- Ti Lung (born 1946), Hong Kong actor
