= Taikyoku shogi =

36×36 grid variant of Japanese chess

The game's 36×36 board with pieces in their opening positions

Taikyoku shōgi (Japanese: 大局将棋; lit. "ultimate shogi") is the largest known variant of shogi (Japanese chess). The game was created around the mid-16th or 17th centuries (presumably by priests) and is based on earlier large board shogi games. Before the rediscovery of taikyoku shogi in 1997, tai shogi was believed to be the largest physically playable chess variant ever. It has not been shown that taikyoku shogi was ever widely played. There are only two sets of restored taikyoku shogi pieces, one of which is held at Osaka University of Commerce. The only played game in recent history was played in 2004 for the Japanese television show The Fountain of Trivia (Fuji Television), which took 32 hours and 41 minutes, spanning over three days, and a total of 3,805 moves.

Because the game was found only recently after centuries of obscurity, it is difficult to say exactly what all the rules were. Several documents describing the game have been found; however, there are differences between them. It is not clear how accurate the rules given by modern sources for the game are, because many of the pieces appear in other shogi variants with a consistent move there, but are given different moves in taikyoku shogi. The board, and likewise the pieces, were made much smaller than usual for the other variants, making archaeological finds difficult to decipher. Research into this game continues.

Taikyoku shogi is very different from other large-board shogi variants: tenjiku shogi, dai dai shogi, maka dai dai shogi, and tai shogi. The most notable differences lie with the piece movements and their promotions.

== Objective ==
The objective of the game is to capture the opponent's king(s) and crown prince(s). When the last of these is captured, the game ends. There are no rules for check or checkmate; however, in practice a player resigns when checkmated. Unlike standard shogi, pieces may not be dropped back into play after being captured.

== Game equipment ==
Two players, Black and White (or 先手 sente and 後手 gote), play on a board ruled into a grid of 36 ranks (rows) by 36 files (columns) with a total of 1,296 squares. Each "square" is a 17mm by 15mm rectangle, making the playing size tantamount to 65 cm by 55 cm. The squares are differentiated by marking or color.

Each player has a set of 402 wedge-shaped pieces of 207 (Note: 208 or 209 if the left and right Howling Dog pieces or the left and right Mountain Eagle pieces are counted as separate.) types. The players must remember 253 sets of moves. The pieces are of slightly different sizes with the larger pieces near the king and becoming progressively smaller for pieces further from the king, regardless of power. In general, the stronger pieces are nearer to the king.

Each piece has its name in the form of two or three kanji written on its face. On the reverse side of some pieces are two or three other characters, often in a different color (commonly red instead of black); this reverse side is used to indicate that the piece has been promoted during play. The pieces of the two sides do not differ in color, but instead each piece is shaped like a wedge, and faces forward, toward the opposing side. This shows who controls the piece during play.

Listed below are the pieces of the game and, if they promote, which pieces they promote to. Promotions prefaced with a star are not also represented as their own pieces, existing only as promotions.

Piece	Kanji	Rōmaji	Promotes to	Kanji	Rōmaji
King	王将 / 玉将	ōshō / gyokushō (Note: The higher ranked player takes the 王将 piece and the lower ranked player takes the 玉将 piece. Originally both kings were named "jewelled general" (玉將), but at one point in history the dot in "jewel" (玉) was left out on one piece to make "king" (王). This is said to be introduced by the great warlord Toyotomi Hideyoshi in the 16th century.)	—		
Crown prince (Note: This is often translated simply as "prince", which is less accurate.)	太子	taishi	King	王将	ōshō
Great general	大将	taishō	—		
Gold general	金将	kinshō	Flying chariot	飛車	hisha
Right general	右将	ushō	*Right army	右軍	ugun
Left general	左将	sashō	*Left army	左軍	sagun
Rear standard	後旗	kōki	Center standard	中旗	chūki
Free king	奔王	honnō	Great general	大将	taishō
Free dream-eater	奔獏	honbaku	Free king	奔王	honnō
Wooden dove	鳩槃	kyūhan	—		
Ceramic dove	鳩盤	kyūban	—		
Earth dragon	地龍	chiryū	Rain dragon	雨龍	uryū
Free demon	奔鬼	honki	Free king	奔王	honnō
Running horse	走馬	sōma, sōba	Free demon	奔鬼	honki
Beast cadet	獣曹	jūsō	Beast officer	獣吏	jūri
Tengu	天狗	tengu	—		
Right mountain eagle	右山鷲	usanshū	Flying eagle	飛鷲	hijū
Left mountain eagle	左山鷲	sasanshū	Flying eagle	飛鷲	hijū
Fire demon	火鬼	kaki	*Free fire	奔火	honka
Whale	鯨鯢	keigei	*Great whale	大鯨	daigei
Running rabbit	走兎	sōto	Treacherous fox	隠狐	inko, onko
White tiger	白虎	byakko	*Divine tiger	神虎	shinko
Turtle-snake	玄武	genbu	*Divine turtle	神亀	shinki
Incense chariot	香車	kyōsha	White foal	白駒	hakku
Reverse chariot	反車	hensha	Whale	鯨鯢	keigei
Fragrant elephant	香象	kōzō	*Elephant king	象王	zōō
White elephant	白象	hakuzō	*Elephant king	象王	zōō
Turtle dove	山鳩	sankyū	Great dove	大鳩	daikyū
Flying swallow	飛燕	hien	Flying chariot	飛車	hisha
Fowl officer	禽吏	kinri	*Fowl	禽鳥	kinchō
Rain dragon	雨龍	uryū	Great dragon	大龍	dairyū
Forest demon	森鬼	shinki	*Thunder runner	雷走	raisō
Mountain stag	山鹿	sanroku	Great stag	大鹿	dairoku
Running pup	走狗	sōku	*Free leopard	奔豹	honpyō
Running serpent	走蛇	sōja	*Free serpent	奔蛇	honja
Side serpent	横蛇	ōja	*Great shark	大鱗	dairin
Great dove	大鳩	daikyū	Wooden dove	鳩槃	kyūhan
Running tiger	走虎	sōko	*Free tiger	奔虎	honko
Running bear	走熊	sōyū	*Free bear	奔熊	hon'yū
Nature spirit	夜叉	yasha	*Heavenly tetrarch (Note: In English this piece is usually pluralized as 'Heavenly Tetrarchs', as this could refer to all four tetrarchs. Nevertheless, it seems more likely that the piece is intended to be singular, because there are four pieces which can promote to this piece and hence four potential tetrarchs.)	四天	shiten
Buddhist devil	羅刹	rasetsu	*Heavenly tetrarch	四天	shiten
Guardian of the gods	金剛	kongō	*Heavenly tetrarch	四天	shiten
Sumo wrestler	力士	rikishi	*Heavenly tetrarch	四天	shiten
Silver general	銀将	ginshō	Vertical mover	竪行	shugyō
Drunken elephant	酔象	suizō	Crown prince	太子	taishi
Neighboring king	近王	kinnō	Front standard	前旗	zenki
Gold chariot	金車	kinsha	*Playful parrot	遊䳇	yūmo
Side dragon	横龍	ōryū	*Running dragon	走龍	sōryū
Running stag	走鹿	sōroku	*Free stag	奔鹿	honroku
Running wolf	走狼	sōrō	*Free wolf	奔狼	honrō
Angle general	角将	kakushō	*Rain demon	霖鬼	rinki
Flying general	飛将	hishō	*Flying crocodile	飛鰐	higaku
Right tiger	右虎	uko	White tiger	白虎	byakko
Left tiger	左虎	sako	Turtle-snake	玄武	genbu
Right dragon	右龍	uryū	Blue dragon	青龍	seiryū
Left dragon	左龍	saryū	Vermillion sparrow	朱雀	suzaku
Beast officer	獣吏	jūri	*Beast bird	獣鳥	jūchō
Wind dragon	風龍	fūryū	*Free dragon	奔龍	honryū
Free pup	奔狗	honku	*Free dog	奔犬	honken
Rushing bird	行鳥	gyōchō	Free demon	奔鬼	honki
Old kite	古鵄	kotetsu	Tengu	天狗	tengu
Peacock	孔雀	kujaku	Tengu	天狗	tengu
Water dragon	水龍	suiryū	Phoenix master	鳳師	hōshi
Fire dragon	火龍	karyū	Kirin master	麟師	rinshi
Copper general	銅将	dōshō	Side mover	横行	ōgyō
Phoenix master	鳳師	hōshi	—		
Kirin master	麟師	rinshi	—		
Silver chariot	銀車	ginsha	*Goose wing	鴻翼	kōyoko
Vertical bear	竪熊	shuyū	*Free bear	奔熊	hon'yū
Cassia horse (Note: Although sometimes translated as "katsura horse" due to the first character, the name keima is derived from a word for cassia (肉桂, nikkei), also known as "Chinese cinnamon," the bark of which is a spice that used to be very valuable in Japan, similar to jade, gold, silver, and incense.)	桂馬	keima	Side soldier	横兵	ōhei
Pig general	豚将	tonshō	*Free pig	奔豚	honton
Chicken general	鶏将	keishō	*Free chicken	奔鶏	honkei
Pup general	狗将	kushō	Free pup	奔狗	honku
Horse general	馬将	bashō	*Free horse	奔馬	honba
Ox general	牛将	gyūshō	*Free ox	奔牛	hongyū
Center standard	中旗	chūki	Front standard	前旗	zenki
Side boar	横猪	ōcho	*Free boar	奔猪	honcho
Silver rabbit	銀兎	ginto	Whale	鯨鯢	keigei
Gold stag	金鹿	konroku	White foal	白駒	hakku
Lion	獅子	shishi	*Furious fiend	奮迅	funjin
Fowl cadet	禽曹	kinsō	Fowl officer	禽吏	kinri
Great stag	大鹿	dairoku	*Free stag	奔鹿	honroku
Fierce dragon	猛龍	mōryū	Great dragon	大龍	dairyū
Woodland demon	林鬼	rinki	*Stone peng (Note: Depending on the source, this might instead be 古鵬 (old peng))	石鵬	sekihō
Vice general	副将	fukushō	Great general	大将	taishō
Stone chariot	石車	sekisha	*Walking heron	歩䳲	fushin
Cloud eagle	雲鷲	unjū	*Strong eagle	勁鷲	keijū
Angle mover	角行	kakugyō	Dragon horse	龍馬	ryūme
Flying chariot	飛車	hisha	Dragon king	龍王	ryūō
Side wolf	横狼	ōrō	*Free wolf	奔狼	honrō
Flying cat	飛猫	hibyō	Flying chariot	飛車	hisha
Mountain hawk	山鷹	san'ō	Horned hawk	角鷹	kakuō
Vertical tiger	竪虎	shuko	*Free tiger	奔虎	honko
Soldier	兵士	heishi	*Cavalier	騎士	kishi
Little standard	小旗	shōki	Rear standard	後旗	kōki
Cloud dragon	雲龍	unryū	Great dragon	大龍	dairyū
Copper chariot	銅車	dōsha	*Copper elephant	銅象	dōzō
Running chariot	走車	sōsha	*Cannon chariot	炮車	hōsha
Ram's-head soldier	羊兵	yōhei	*Tiger soldier	虎兵	kohei
Fierce ox	猛牛	mōgyū	Flying ox	飛牛	higyū
Great dragon	大龍	dairyū	*Ancient dragon	元龍	genryū, ganryū
Gold bird	金翅	kinshi	*Free bird	奔翅	honshi
Dark spirit	無明	mumyō	*Buddhist spirit	法性	hōsei
Deva	提婆	daiba	*King of teachings	教王	kyōō
Wood chariot	木車	mokusha	*Wind snapping turtle	風鼈	fūbetsu
White foal	白駒	hakku	*Great foal	大駒	daiku
Howling dog (left)	𠵇犬	kiken	*Left dog	左犬	saken
Howling dog (right)	𠵇犬	kiken	*Right dog	右犬	uken
Side mover	横行	ōgyō	*Free boar	奔猪	honcho
Prancing stag	踊鹿	yōroku	Square mover	方行	hōgyō
Water ox	水牛	suigyū	*Great dream-eater	大獏	daibaku
Fierce leopard	猛豹	mōhyō	Angle mover	角行	kakugyō
Fierce eagle	猛鷲	mōjū	Flying eagle	飛鷲	hijū
Flying dragon	飛龍	hiryū	Dragon king	龍王	ryūō
Poisonous serpent	毒蛇	dokuja	Hook mover	鉤行	kōgyō
Flying goose	鳫飛	ganhi	Swallow's wings	燕羽	en'u
Strutting crow	烏行	ukō	*Flying hawk	飛鷹	hiyō
Blind dog	盲犬	mōken	Fierce stag	猛鹿	mōroku
Water general	水将	suishō	Vice general	副将	fukushō
Fire general	火将	kashō	Great general	大将	taishō
Phoenix	鳳凰	hōō	Gold bird	金翅	kinshi
Kirin (Note: This is sometimes romanized as "kylin".)	麒麟	kirin	Gold bird	金翅	kinshi
Hook mover	鉤行	kōgyō	—		
Little turtle	小亀	shōki	*Treasure turtle	宝亀	hōki
Great turtle	大亀	daiki	*Spirit turtle	霊亀	reiki
Capricorn	摩羯	makatsu	Hook mover	鉤行	kōgyō
Tile chariot	瓦車	gasha	*Running tile	走瓦	sōga
Vertical wolf	竪狼	shurō	Running wolf	走狼	sōrō
Side ox	横牛	ōgyū	Flying ox	飛牛	higyū
Donkey	驢馬	roba	Ceramic dove	鳩盤	kyūban
Flying horse	馬麟	barin	Free king	奔王	honnō
Fierce bear	猛熊	mōyū	*Great bear	大熊	daiyū
Angry boar	嗔猪	shincho	*Free boar	奔猪	honcho
Evil wolf	悪狼	akurō	*Poisonous wolf	毒狼	dokurō
Wind horse	風馬	fūma	*Heavenly horse	天馬	temma
Flying chicken	鶏飛	keihi	*Raiding hawk	延鷹	en'yō
Old monkey	古猿	koen	*Mountain witch	山母	sanbo
Huai chicken	淮鶏	waikei	*Wizard stork	仙	senkaku
Northern barbarian	北狄	hokuteki	Wooden dove	鳩槃	kyūhan
Southern barbarian	南蛮	nanban	Gold bird	金翅	kinshi
Western barbarian	西戎	seijū	Lion dog	狛犬	komainu
Eastern barbarian	東夷	tōi	Lion	獅子	shishi
Fierce stag	猛鹿	mōroku	*Rushing boar	行猪	gyōcho
Fierce wolf	猛狼	mōrō	*Bear's eyes	熊眼	yūgan
Treacherous fox	隠狐	inko, onko	*Mountain crane	山鶻	sankotsu
Center master	中師	chūshi	—		
Peng master	鵬師	hōshi	—		
Earth chariot	土車	dosha	*Reed bird	芦鳥	shakuchō
Vermillion sparrow	朱雀	suzaku	*Divine sparrow	神雀	shinjaku
Blue dragon	青龍	seiryū	*Divine dragon	神龍	shinryū
Enchanted badger	変狸	henri	Ceramic dove	鳩盤	kyūban
Horseman	騎兵	kihei	*Cavalier	騎士	kishi
Swooping owl	鴟行	shigyō	Cloud eagle	雲鷲	unjū
Climbing monkey	登猿	tōen	Fierce stag	猛鹿	mōroku
Cat sword	猫刀	myōjin	Dragon horse	龍馬	ryūme
Swallow's wings	燕羽	en'u	*Gliding swallow	燕行	engyō
Blind monkey	盲猿	mōen	*Flying stag	飛鹿	hiroku
Blind tiger	盲虎	mōko	*Flying stag	飛鹿	hiroku
Ox chariot	牛車	gissha	*Plodding ox	歬牛	sengyū
Side flyer	横飛	ōhi	Side dragon	横龍	ōryū
Blind bear	盲熊	mōyū	*Flying stag	飛鹿	hiroku
Old rat	老鼠	rōso	*Mocking bird	or	jichō
Square mover	方行	hōgyō	*Strong chariot	強車	kyōsha
Coiled serpent	蟠蛇	banja	*Coiled dragon	蟠龍	banryū
Reclining dragon	臥龍	garyū	Great dragon	大龍	dairyū
Free eagle	奔鷲	honjū	—		
Lion hawk	獅鷹	shiō	—		
Chariot soldier	車兵	shahei	*Heavenly tetrarch king	四天王	shitennō
Side soldier	横兵	ōhei	Water ox	水牛	suigyū
Vertical soldier	竪兵	shuhei	Chariot soldier	車兵	shahei
Wind general	風将	fūshō	*Fierce wind	暴風	bōfū
River general	川将	senshō	*Huai river	淮川	waisen
Mountain general	山将	sanshō	*Mount Tai	泰山	taisan
Front standard	前旗	zenki	Great standard	大旗	daiki
Horse soldier	馬兵	bahei	Running horse	走馬	sōma, sōba
Wood general	木将	mokushō	White elephant	白象	hakuzō
Ox soldier	牛兵	gyūhei	*Running ox	走牛	sōgyū
Earth general	土将	doshō	White elephant	白象	hakuzō
Boar soldier	猪兵	chohei	*Running boar	走猪	sōcho
Stone general	石将	sekishō	White elephant	白象	hakuzō
Leopard soldier	豹兵	hyōhei	*Running leopard	走豹	sōhyō
Tile general	瓦将	gashō	White elephant	白象	hakuzō
Bear soldier	熊兵	yūhei	*Strong bear	強熊	kyōyū
Iron general	鉄将	tesshō	White elephant	白象	hakuzō
Great standard	大旗	daiki	—		
Great master	大師	daishi	—		
Right chariot	右車	usha	*Right iron chariot	右鉄車	utessha
Left chariot	左車	sasha	*Left iron chariot	左鉄車	satessha
Side monkey	横猿	ōen	Side soldier	横兵	ōhei
Vertical mover	竪行	shugyō	Flying ox	飛牛	higyū
Flying ox	飛牛	higyū	*Fire ox	火牛	kagyū
Longbow soldier	弩兵	dohei	*Longbow general	弩将	doshō
Vertical pup	竪狗	shuku	*Leopard king	豹王	hyōō
Vertical horse	竪馬	shuba	Dragon horse	龍馬	ryūme
Cannon soldier	炮兵	hōhei	*Cannon general	炮将	hōshō
Dragon horse	龍馬	ryūme	Horned hawk	角鷹	kakuō
Dragon king	龍王	ryūō	Flying eagle	飛鷲	hijū
Sword soldier	刀兵	tōhei	*Sword general	刀将	tōshō
Horned hawk	角鷹	kakuō	*Great hawk	大鷹	daiō
Flying eagle	飛鷲	hijū	*Great eagle	大鷲	daijū
Spear soldier	鎗兵	sōhei	*Spear general	鎗将	sōshō
Vertical leopard	竪豹	shuhyō	*Great leopard	大豹	daihyō
Fierce tiger	猛虎	mōko	*Great tiger	大虎	daiko
Crossbow soldier	弓兵	kyūhei	*Crossbow general	弓将	kyūshō
Roaring dog	吼犬	kōken	Lion dog	狛犬	komainu
Lion dog	狛犬	komainu	*Great elephant	大象	taizō
Dog	犬	inu	*Multi general	雜将	suishō
Go-between	仲人	chūnin	Drunken elephant	酔象	suizō
Pawn	歩兵	fuhyō	Gold general	と金 (Note: This is another name for the gold general, which is usually named 金将. Promoted pawns move identically to gold generals.)	tokin

In smaller variants of shogi, some pieces that move identically or similarly to chess pieces are given the name of the chess piece. However, in taikyoku shogi, this breaks down since there are other pieces with the same movements as in chess. Hence, and for the purpose of consistency, names of the pieces have simply been translated from Japanese. A list can be seen here:

Chess name	Japanese	Translation
Knight	桂馬	Cassia horse
Bishop	角将	Angle mover
Rook	飛車	Flying chariot
Queen	奔王	Free king
Lance (Note: This is the name given to this piece in regular shogi due to its movement being an unlimited range forwards; note that this movement is shared with the 牛車 (ox chariot) and 猛虎 (fierce tiger).)	香車	Incense chariot

Note also that even though 歩兵 translates directly to "foot soldier", it is named "pawn", the same as in chess, since "pawn" comes from the Medieval Latin term for "foot soldier".

== Setup ==
Taikyoku Shogi

Below is a diagram showing the setup of one player's pieces. The way one player sees their own pieces is the same way the opposing player will see their pieces.

Board layout
					D					GB				D							D				GB					D
P	P	P	P	P	P	P	P	P	P	P	P	P	P	P	P	P	P	P	P	P	P	P	P	P	P	P	P	P	P	P	P	P	P	P	P
LC	MK	VM	OX	LB	VP	VH	BN	DH	DK	SE	HF	EL	SP	VL	TG	SC	LD	DG	SC	TG	VL	SP	EL	HF	SE	DK	DH	BN	VH	VP	LB	OX	VM	MK	RC
CH	SL	VR	WN	RE	M	SD	HS	GN	OS	EA	BS	SG	LP	T	BE	I	GM	GE	I	BE	T	LP	SG	BS	EA	OS	GN	HS	SD	M	RE	WN	VR	SL	CH
EC	BL	EB	HO	OW	CM	CS	SW	BM	BT	OC	SF	BB	OR	SQ	SN	RD	LI	FE	RD	SN	SQ	OR	BB	SF	OC	BT	BM	SW	CS	CM	OW	HO	EB	VI	EC
TC	VW	SX	DO	FH	VB	AB	EW	WI	CK	OM	CC	WS	ES	VS	NT	TF	PE	MT	TF	NT	VS	SU	NB	CC	OM	CK	WI	EW	AB	VB	FH	DO	SX	VW	TC
WC	WH	DL	SM	PR	WB	FL	EG	FD	PS	FY	ST	BI	WG	F	KR	CA	GT	LL	HM	PH	F	WG	BI	ST	FY	PS	FD	EG	FL	WB	PR	SM	DR	WH	WC
CI	CE	B	R	WF	FC	MF	VT	SO	LS	CL	CR	RH	HE	VO	GD	GO	DV	DS	GO	GD	VO	HE	RH	CR	CL	LS	SO	VT	MF	FC	WF	R	B	CE	CI
SV	VE	N	PI	CG	PG	H	O	CN	SA	SR	GL	LN	CT	GS	VD	WL	GG	VG	WL	VD	GS	CT	LN	GL	SR	SA	CN	O	H	PG	CG	PI	N	VE	SV
GC	SI	RN	RW	BG	RO	LT	LE	BO	WD	FP	RB	OK	PC	WA	FI	C	KM	PM	C	FI	WA	PC	OK	RB	FP	WD	BO	RI	TT	RO	BG	RW	RN	SI	GC
RV	WE	TD	FS	CO	RA	FO	MS	RP	RU	SS	GR	RT	BA	BD	WR	S	NK	DE	S	GU	YA	BA	RT	GR	SS	RU	RP	MS	FO	RA	CO	FS	TD	FG	RV
L	TS	RR	W	DM	ML	LO	BC	HR	FR	ED	CD	FT	Q	RS	LG	G	K	CP	G	RG	RS	Q	FT	WO	ED	FR	HR	BC	LO	MR	DM	W	RR	WT	L

Legend

AB – Angry boar
B – Angle mover
BA – Running bear
BB – Blind bear
BC – Beast cadet
BD – Buddhist devil
BE – Bear soldier
BG – Angle general
BI – Blind dog
BL – Blue dragon
BM – Blind monkey
BN – Cannon soldier
BO – Beast officer
BS – Boar soldier
BT – Blind tiger
C – Copper general
CA – Capricorn
CC – Huai chicken
CD – Ceramic dove
CE – Cloud eagle
CG – Chicken general
CH – Chariot soldier
CI – Stone chariot
CK – Flying chicken
CL – Cloud dragon
CM – Climbing monkey
CN – Center standard
CO – Fowl officer
CP – Crown prince
CR – Copper chariot
CS – Cat sword
CT – Fowl cadet
D – Dog
DE – Drunken elephant
DG – Roaring dog
DH – Dragon horse
DK – Dragon king
DM – Fire demon
DO – Donkey
DS – Dark spirit
DV – Deva
EA – Earth general
EB – Enchanted badger
EC – Earth chariot
ED – Earth dragon
EG – Fierce eagle
EL – Flying eagle
ES – Eastern barbarian
EW – Evil wolf
F – Fire general
FC – Flying cat
FD – Flying dragon
FE – Free eagle
FG – Fragrant elephant
FH – Flying horse
FI – Fire dragon
FL – Fierce leopard
FO – Forest demon
FP – Free pup
FR – Free demon
FS – Flying swallow
FT – Free dream-eater
FY – Flying goose
G – Gold general
GB – Go-between
GC – Gold chariot
GD – Great dragon
GE – Great standard
GG – Great general
GL – Gold stag
GM – Great master
GN – Wood general
GO – Gold bird
GR – Great dove
GS – Great stag
GT – Great turtle
GU – Guardian of the gods
H – Horse general
DL – Howling dog (left)
DR – Howling dog (right)
HE – Ram's-head soldier
HF – Horned hawk
HM – Hook mover
HO – Horseman
HR – Running horse
HS – Horse soldier
I – Iron general
K – King
KM – Kirin master
KR – Kirin
L – Incense chariot
LB – Longbow soldier
LC – Left chariot
LD – Lion dog
LE – Left dragon
LG – Left general
LI – Lion hawk
LL – Little turtle
LN – Lion
LO – Tengu
LP – Leopard soldier
LS – Little standard
LT – Left tiger
M – Mountain general
MF – Mountain hawk
MK – Side monkey
ML – Left mountain eagle
MR – Right mountain eagle
MS – Mountain stag
MT – Center master
N – Cassia horse
NB – Northern barbarian
NK – Neighboring king
NT – Fierce wolf
O – Ox general
OC – Ox chariot
OK – Old kite
OM – Old monkey
OR – Old rat
OS – Ox soldier
OW – Swooping owl
OX – Flying ox
P – Pawn
PC – Peacock
PE – Peng master
PG – Pup general
PH – Phoenix
PI – Pig general
PM – Phoenix master
PR – Prancing stag
PS – Poisonous serpent
Q – Free king
R – Flying chariot
RA – Rain dragon
RB – Rushing bird
RC – Right chariot
RD – Reclining dragon
RE – River general
RG – Right general
RH – Running chariot
RI – Right dragon
RN – Running stag
RO – Flying general
RP – Running pup
RR – Running rabbit
RS – Rear standard
RT – Running tiger
RU – Running serpent
RV – Reverse chariot
RW – Running wolf
S – Silver general
SA – Side boar
SC – Crossbow soldier
SD – Front standard
SE – Sword soldier
SF – Side flyer
SG – Stone general
SI – Side dragon
SL – Side soldier
SM – Side mover
SN – Coiled serpent
SO – Soldier
SP – Spear soldier
SQ – Square mover
SR – Silver rabbit
SS – Side serpent
ST – Strutting crow
SU – Southern barbarian
SV – Silver chariot
SW – Swallow's wings
SX – Side ox
T – Tile general
TC – Tile chariot
TD – Turtle dove
TF – Treacherous fox
TG – Fierce tiger
TS – Turtle-snake
TT – Right tiger
VB – Fierce bear
VD – Fierce dragon
VE – Vertical bear
VG – Vice general
VH – Vertical horse
VI – Vermillion sparrow
VL – Vertical leopard
VM – Vertical mover
VO – Fierce ox
VP – Vertical pup
VR – Vertical soldier
VS – Fierce stag
VT – Vertical tiger
VW – Vertical wolf
W – Whale
WA – Water dragon
WB – Water ox
WC – Wood chariot
WD – Wind dragon
WE – White elephant
WF – Side wolf
WG – Water general
WH – White foal
WI – Wind horse
WL – Woodland demon
WN – Wind general
WO – Wooden dove
WR – Sumo wrestler
WS – Western barbarian
WT – White tiger
YA – Nature spirit

== Game play ==
The players alternate making a move, with Black moving first. (The traditional terms 'black' and 'white' are used to differentiate the sides during discussion of the game, but are no longer literally descriptive.) A move consists of moving a single piece on the board and potentially promoting that piece or displacing (capturing) an opposing piece.

== Movement and capture ==
Most pieces in the game move in a unique manner. An opposing piece is captured by displacement: That is, if a piece moves to a square occupied by an opposing piece, the opposing piece is displaced and removed from the board. A piece cannot move to a square occupied by a friendly piece (meaning another piece controlled by the moving player).

Each piece on the game moves in a characteristic pattern. Pieces move either orthogonally (that is, forward, backward, left, or right, in the direction of one of the arms of a plus sign, +), or diagonally (in the direction of one of the arms of a multiplication sign, ×). The lion, lion hawk and cassia horse are exceptions at the beginning of the game, in that they do not move, or are not required to move, in a straight line. (The Buddhist spirit, king of teachings, heavenly horse and furious fiend are similar, but they only appear as pieces promote.)

=== Promotion ===
Complete rules have not been found, and different sources vary on how promotion is handled. Either a piece that can promote promotes when it makes its first capture, or a player must promote the piece when it enters one of the 11 ranks at the opposite side of the board.

=== Categories of movement ===
Many pieces are capable of several kinds of movement, with the type of movement most often depending on the direction in which they move. The movement categories are:

Step movers

Some pieces move only one square at a time. (If a friendly piece occupies an adjacent square, the moving piece may not move in that direction; if an opposing piece is there, it may be displaced and captured.)

The step movers are the crown prince, generals (except: angle mover, flying chariot, pig, vice, great and wood), wolves, earth dragon, running horse, running rabbit, turtle-snake, turtle dove, flying swallow, rain dragon, mountain stag, running pup, running serpent, side serpent, nature spirit, Buddhist devil, fierce stag, drunken elephant, neighboring king, chariots (except: reverse, running and copper), right tiger, left tiger, wind dragon, free pup, rushing bird, old kite, bears (except running), side boar, cloud eagle, flying cat, little standard, cloud dragon, soldiers (except soldier and chariot), fierce ox, dark spirit, deva, howling dog, side mover, prancing stag, fierce leopard, fierce eagle, poisonous serpent, flying goose, strutting crow, blind dog, Huai chicken, phoenix, kirin, side ox, angry boar, wind horse, flying chicken, monkeys, barbarians, vermillion sparrow, swooping owl, old rat, cat sword, swallow's wings, blind tiger, side flyer, coiled serpent, reclining dragon, go-between, dog, vertical mover, vertical pup, vertical horse, dragon horse, dragon king and pawn.

Limited ranging pieces

Some pieces can move along a limited number (2 to 7) of free (empty) squares along a straight line in certain directions. Other than the limited distance, they move like ranging pieces (see below).

The limited ranging pieces are the king, standards, free dream-eater, wooden dove, dragons (except: rain, side, wind, cloud, flying and reclining), demons, beast cadet, mountain eagle, white tiger, ceramic dove, turtle dove, fowl officer, mountain stag, side serpent, great dove, running tiger, running bear, nature spirit, Buddhist devil, guardian of the Gods, sumo wrestler, gold chariot, running stag, beast officer, free pup, rushing bird, old kite, peacock, phoenix master, kirin master, silver chariot, vertical bear, pig general, chicken general, horse general, ox general, silver rabbit, gold stag, fowl cadet, great stag, stone chariot, cloud eagle, mountain hawk, vertical tiger, copper chariot, gold bird, prancing stag, water ox, fierce eagle, water general, mountain general, fire general, turtles, vertical wolf, donkey, enchanted badger, flying horse, angry boar, fierce bear, wind horse, barbarians, center master, peng master, horseman, soldiers (except: flying chariot, ram's-head, spear and sword), wing general, wind general, wood general, great master and roaring dog.

Jumping pieces

Several pieces can jump, that is, they can pass over any intervening piece, whether friend or foe, with no effect on either.

The jumping pieces are the wooden dove, running horse, mountain eagle, phoenix master, kirin master, cassia horse, lion, great stag, vice general, flying cat, mountain hawk, gold bird, flying dragon, phoenix, kirin, turtles, treacherous fox, center master, peng master, free eagle, lion hawk, great master, horned hawk, flying eagle, roaring dog and lion dog.

Ranging pieces

Many pieces can move any number of empty squares along a straight line, limited only by the edge of the board. If an opposing piece intervenes, it may be captured by moving to that square and removing it from the board. A ranging piece must stop where it captures, and cannot bypass a piece that is in its way. If a friendly piece intervenes, the moving piece is limited to a distance that stops short of the intervening piece; if the friendly piece is adjacent, it cannot move in that direction at all.

The ranging pieces are the standards, free king, free dream-eater, wooden dove, dragons (except: fierce, flying and reclining), demons, running horse, mountain eagle, whale, running rabbit, tigers (except blind), turtle-snake, ceramic dove, incense chariot, ox chariot, chariots, flying swallow, running pup, running serpent, great dove, running bear, running stag, running wolf, free pup, phoenix master, kirin master, vertical bear, side boar, silver rabbit, gold stag, great stag, cloud eagle, angle mover, flying chariot, side wolf, mountain hawk, soldiers (except: sword, cannon and crossbow), fierce ox, gold bird, white foal, howling dog, side mover, water ox, turtles, vertical wolf, side ox, wind horse, treacherous fox, peng master, vermillion sparrow, horseman, swallow's wings, side flyer, great master, side monkey, vertical mover, flying ox, vertical pup, vertical horse, dragon horse, dragon king, horned hawk, flying eagle, roaring dog and lion dog.

Hook moves (changing tack)

The hook mover, tengu, capricorn, and peacock can move any number of squares along a straight line, as a normal ranging piece, but may also abruptly change tack left or right by 90° at any one place along the route, and then continue as a ranging piece. Turning a corner like this is optional.

The range covered by a hook move is the equivalent of two moves by a rook, or two moves by a bishop, depending on the piece. However, a hook move is functionally a single move: The piece cannot capture twice in one move, nor may it capture and then move on. It must stop before an intervening piece (unless it first changes direction to avoid it), and must stop when it captures, just like any other ranging piece. It can only change direction once per move.

Area movers

The lion and lion hawk may take multiple (2) steps in a single turn. These do not have to be in a line, so these pieces can potentially reach every square within two or three steps of the starting square, not just squares along one of the diagonals or orthogonals. Such moves are also useful to get around obstructions. An area mover must stop where it captures.

Limited range jumping pieces

The heavenly tetrarch king, great hawk, rain demon, great eagle, treacherous fox and mountain crane may jump a limited number of squares, before (optionally) continuing on in the same direction as a ranging piece. This is also the likely behavior of the gold bird, free bird, ancient dragon, great elephant and king of teachings.

Range capturing pieces

The great general, vice general, flying general, angle general, fierce dragon and flying crocodile may jump over any number of pieces, friend or foe, along a diagonal or orthogonal. They capture all pieces they jump over, as well as the one they land on.

However, they may only jump over or land on pieces of lower rank, whether friend or foe. The relevant ranking is:

1. King, crown prince
2. Great general
3. Vice general
4. Flying general, angle general, fierce dragon, flying crocodile

This ranking makes it impossible for range capturing pieces to capture the king or crown prince. (Note: Interpretation of this rule is unclear, and some may claim that range capturing pieces can capture pieces of equal or higher rank, whilst not being able to jump over them. However, this would allow sente to capture gote's crown prince in the very first move of the game, and would likely lead to large imbalance.)

=== Individual pieces ===
Notation
○	Steps a limited number of squares along a straight line.
│	Ranges along a straight line, crossing any number of empty squares.
─	Ranges along a straight line, crossing any number of empty squares.
╲	Ranges along a straight line, crossing any number of empty squares.
╱	Ranges along a straight line, crossing any number of empty squares.
╳	May turn 90° at this square.
┼	May turn 90° at this square.
☆	Jumps to this square, bypassing any intervening piece(s).
○	After making a jump marked by a ☆, steps a limited number of steps alone a straight line.
│	After making a jump marked by a ☆, ranges along a straight line, crossing any number of empty squares.
─	After making a jump marked by a ☆, ranges along a straight line, crossing any number of empty squares.
╲	After making a jump marked by a ☆, ranges along a straight line, crossing any number of empty squares.
╱	After making a jump marked by a ☆, ranges along a straight line, crossing any number of empty squares.
3	Likely means a piece may jump up to 3 squares in this direction, then (optionally) continue ranging in that direction. Exact meaning is unknown. (Note: In the book Sekai no Shogi, this is represented by an arrow with 3 perpendicular slashes through it. The author notes "There is no detailed explanation in the original text, so it is unclear, but it is thought that it is possible to jump over up to three pieces [squares] and run [range]." →の説明については、原典では詳しい説明がなく、不明であるが筋が3っ引いてあるものは、駒を 3 つまで飛び越して走りが出来るものと思われる。) (Note: The book Shōgi Rokushu no Zushiki includes the same symbol when describing pieces in Maka Dai Dai Shogi, and implies that pieces with this symbol have the special "power moves" of the lion dog. However, the lion dog described in Shōgi Rokushu no Zushiki for Maka Dai Dai Shogi is different to the lion dog described in Sekai no Shogi for Taikyoku Shogi. Furthermore, translations of the classical Japanese leave ambiguity about whether it should be interpreted as a "leap" over multiple pieces, or as the "dance" of the lion dog.)
☆	May jump directly to this square, or reach it through a multiple-step move.
!	Igui (capture without moving).
│	Flies over any number of squares along a straight line, capturing all pieces it jumps over, as long as all pieces it captures are of a lower rank.
─	Flies over any number of squares along a straight line, capturing all pieces it jumps over, as long as all pieces it captures are of a lower rank.
╲	Flies over any number of squares along a straight line, capturing all pieces it jumps over, as long as all pieces it captures are of a lower rank.
╱	Flies over any number of squares along a straight line, capturing all pieces it jumps over, as long as all pieces it captures are of a lower rank.

Pawn (歩兵)

- Step: The pawn can move one square orthogonally forward.
- Betza Notation: fW

○
☖

Earth general (土将) and go-between (仲人)

- Step: The earth general and go-between can move one square orthogonally forward or backward.
- Notation: vW
- They have the same range of movement but promote differently (see above).

○
☖
○

Stone general (石将)

- Step: The stone general can move one square diagonally forward.
- Notation: fF

Because it cannot move orthogonally or backward, a stone general can only reach less than half the squares on the board.

○		○
	☖	

Iron general (鉄将) and dog (犬)

- Step: The iron general and dog can move one square forward, orthogonally or diagonally.
- Notation: fWfF
- They have the same range of movement but promote differently (see above).

○	○	○
	☖	

Swooping owl (鴟行), old rat (老鼠) and strutting crow (烏行)

- Step: The swooping owl, old rat and strutting crow can move one square orthogonally forward or diagonally backward.
- Notation: fWbF
- They have the same range of movement but promote differently (see above).

	○	
	☖	
○		○

Tile general (瓦将) and sword soldier (刀兵)

- Step: The tile general and sword soldier can move one square diagonally forward or orthogonally backward.
- Notation: bWfF
- They have the same range of movement but promote differently (see above).

○		○
	☖	
	○	

Copper general (銅将), flying goose (鳫飛) and climbing monkey (登猿)

- Step: The copper general, flying goose, and climbing monkey can move one square orthogonally forward or backward, or diagonally forward.
- Notation: vWfF
- They have the same range of movement but each promotes differently (see above).

○	○	○
	☖	
	○	

Reclining dragon (臥龍)

- Step: The reclining dragon can move one square in the four orthogonal directions.
- Notation: W

	○	
○	☖	○
	○	

Coiled serpent (蟠蛇)

- Step: The coiled serpent can move one square orthogonally forward or backward; or diagonally backward.
- Notation: vWbF

	○	
	☖	
○	○	○

Flying chicken (鶏飛)

- Step: The flying chicken can move one square orthogonally sideways or diagonally forward.
- Notation: sWfF

○		○
○	☖	○

Cat sword (猫刀)

- Step: The cat sword can move one square in the four diagonal directions.
- Notation: F

Because it cannot move orthogonally, a cat sword can only reach half the squares on the board.

○		○
	☖	
○		○

Evil wolf (悪狼)

- Step: The evil wolf can move one square orthogonally sideways or forward; or diagonally forward.
- Notation: fFfsW

○	○	○
○	☖	○

Silver general (銀将) and fierce stag (猛鹿)

- Step: The silver general and fierce stag can move one square in the four diagonal directions; or one square orthogonally forward.
- Notation: FfW
- They have the same range of movement but promote differently (see above).

○	○	○
	☖	
○		○

Blind dog (盲犬) and Huai chicken (淮鶏)

- Step: The blind dog and Huai chicken can move one square orthogonally backward or sideways or one square diagonally forward.
- Notation: fFbsW
- They have the same range of movement but promote differently (see above).

○		○
○	☖	○
	○	

Old monkey (古猿)

- Step: The old monkey can move one square in the four diagonal directions or orthogonally backward.
- Notation: FbW

○		○
	☖	
○	○	○

Gold general (金将) and fierce wolf (猛狼)

- Step: The gold general and fierce wolf can step one square in the four orthogonal directions or diagonally forward, giving them six possibilities.
- They cannot move diagonally backward.
- Notation: WfF
- The pieces have the same range of movement but promote differently (see above).

○	○	○
○	☖	○
	○	

Fierce leopard (猛豹)

- Step: The fierce leopard can move one square in the four diagonal directions; or orthogonally forward or backward.
- Notation: vK

○	○	○
	☖	
○	○	○

Blind monkey (盲猿), blind bear (盲熊) and angry boar (嗔猪)

- Step: The blind monkey, blind bear and angry boar can move one square in the four diagonal directions or orthogonally sideways.
- Notation: sK

○		○
○	☖	○
○		○

Drunken elephant (酔象), neighboring king (近王) and rushing boar (行猪)

- Step: The drunken elephant, neighboring king and rushing boar can move one square in any direction, orthogonal or diagonal, except orthogonally backward.
- Notation: fsK
- They have the same range of movement but promote differently (see above).

○	○	○
○	☖	○
○		○

Deva (提婆)

- Step: The Deva can move one square in any direction orthogonally or diagonally, except diagonally forward to the right.
- Notation: WflFbF

○	○	
○	☖	○
○	○	○

Dark spirit (無明)

- Step: The dark spirit can move one square in any direction orthogonally or diagonally, except diagonally forward to the left.
- Notation: WfrFbF

	○	○
○	☖	○
○	○	○

Blind tiger (盲虎)

- Step: The blind tiger can move one square in any direction, orthogonal or diagonal, except orthogonally forward.
- Notation: FbWsW

○		○
○	☖	○
○	○	○

Left general (左将)

- Step: The left general can move one square orthogonally vertically or to the right, or one square diagonally to the right. (Note: Sekai no Shogi claims that the left and right generals move identically to the king. Ten Shogi Variants claims that other sources have these pieces move like "Kings but not stepping to left or right." This is what is used in this article, with the assumption that "left or right" includes diagonal left/right directions as well as orthogonally left/right.)
- Notation: rFvWrW

○	○
☖	○
○	○

Right general (右将)

- Step: The right general can move one square orthogonally vertically or to the left, or one square diagonally to the left.
- Notation: lFvWlW

○	○
○	☖
○	○

Crown prince (太子), bear's eyes (熊眼) and poisonous wolf (毒狼)

- Step: The crown prince, bear's eyes and poisonous wolf can step one square in any direction, orthogonal or diagonal.
- Notation: K
- A crown prince may move into check (not recommended).
- The pieces have the same range of movement but promote differently (see above).

○	○	○
○	☖	○
○	○	○

Wood general (木将)

- Limited range: The wood general can move one or two squares diagonally forward.
- Notation: fB2

○				○
	○		○	
		☖		

Donkey (驢馬) and enchanted badger (変狸)

- Limited range: The donkey and enchanted badger can move one or two squares in the four orthogonal directions.
- Notation: R2
- Their range of movement and promotions are the same.

		○		
		○		
○	○	☖	○	○
		○		
		○		

Flying horse (馬麟)

- Limited range: The flying horse can move one or two squares in the four diagonal directions.
- Notation: B2

○				○
	○		○	
		☖		
	○		○	
○				○

Beast cadet (獣曹)

- Limited range: The beast cadet can move one or two squares orthogonally forward, sideways or in the four diagonal directions.
- Notation: B2fsR2

○		○		○
	○	○	○	
○	○	☖	○	○
	○		○	
○				○

King (王将/玉将), fragrant elephant (香象) and white elephant (白象)

- Limited range: The king, fragrant elephant and white elephant can move one or two squares in any direction, orthogonal or diagonal.
- Notation: Q2
- The king may move into check (not recommended).
- The elephants have the same promotion.

○		○		○
	○	○	○	
○	○	☖	○	○
	○	○	○	
○		○		○

Rushing bird (行鳥)

- Step: The rushing bird can move one square orthogonally sideways or in the four diagonal directions.
- Limited range: It can move one or two squares orthogonally forward.
- Notation: FsWfW2

	○	
○	○	○
○	☖	○
○		○

Fierce bear (猛熊)

- Limited range: The fierce bear can move one or two squares diagonally forward.
- Step: It can move one square orthogonally sideways.
- Notation: fB2fsW

○				○
	○	○	○	
	○	☖	○	

Eastern barbarian (東夷) and western barbarian (西戎)

- Limited range: The eastern barbarian and western barbarian can move one or two squares orthogonally forward or backward.
- Step: They can move one square orthogonally sideways or diagonally forward.
- Notation: sWvW2fF
- They have the same range of movement but promote differently (see above).

	○	
○	○	○
○	☖	○
	○	
	○	

Northern barbarian (北狄), southern barbarian (南蛮) and prancing stag (踊鹿)

- Limited range: The northern barbarian, southern barbarian and prancing stag can move one or two squares orthogonally sideways.
- Step: They can move one square orthogonally forward or backward or diagonally forward.
- Notation: vWsW2fF
- They have the same range of movement but promote differently (see above).

	○	○	○	
○	○	☖	○	○
		○		

Poisonous serpent (毒蛇)

- Step: The poisonous serpent can move one square orthogonally backward or diagonally forward.
- Limited range: It can moves one or two squares orthogonally forward or sideways.
- Notation: sfW2bW1fF

		○		
	○	○	○	
○	○	☖	○	○
		○		

Old kite (古鵄) Kite here refers to the bird of prey.

- Limited range: The old kite can move one or two squares in the four diagonal directions; or
- Step: It can move one square orthogonally sideways.
- Notation: B2sW

○				○
	○		○	
	○	☖	○	
	○		○	
○				○

Fierce eagle (猛鷲)

- Limited range: The fierce eagle can move one or two squares in the four diagonal directions.
- Step: It can move one square orthogonally forward or sideways.
- Notation: B2fsW

○				○
	○	○	○	
	○	☖	○	
	○		○	
○				○

Guardian of the gods (金剛)

- Limited range: The guardian of the gods can move one to three squares in the four orthogonal directions.
- Notation: R3

			○			
			○			
			○			
○	○	○	☖	○	○	○
			○			
			○			
			○			

Sumo wrestler (力士)

- Limited range: The sumo wrestler can move one to three squares in the four diagonal directions.
- Notation: B3

○						○
	○				○	
		○		○		
			☖			
		○		○		
	○				○	
○						○

Fowl cadet (禽曹)

- Limited range: The fowl cadet can move one to three squares orthogonally forward or sideways, or in the four diagonal directions.
- Notation: B3fsR3

When it promotes to a fowl officer (see above), it demotes (moving only two squares orthogonally instead of three).

○			○			○
	○		○		○	
		○	○	○		
○	○	○	☖	○	○	○
		○		○		
	○				○	
○						○

Horse general (馬将), ox general (牛将), wind general (風将) and river general (川将)

- Step: The horse general, the ox general, the wind general and the river general can move one square orthogonally backward or diagonally forward.
- Limited range: They can move one to three squares orthogonally forward.
- Notation: fFbWfR3
- These pieces and their promotions have the same range of motion.

	○	
	○	
○	○	○
	☖	
	○	

Fire general (火将)

- Step: The fire general can move one square diagonally forward.
- Limited range: It can move one to three squares orthogonally forward or backward.
- Notation: fFvR3

	○	
	○	
○	○	○
	☖	
	○	
	○	
	○	

Water general (水将) and mountain general (山将)

- Step: The water general and mountain general can move one square orthogonally forward or backward.
- Limited range: They can move one to three squares diagonally forward.
- Notation: fB3vW
- They have the same range of movement but promote differently (see above).

○						○
	○				○	
		○	○	○		
			☖			
			○			

Buddhist devil (羅刹)

- Limited range: The Buddhist devil can move one to three squares diagonally forward.
- Step: It can move one square orthogonally sideways or backward.
- Notation: fB3bsW

○						○
	○				○	
		○		○		
		○	☖	○		
			○			

Nature spirit (夜叉)

- Step: The nature spirit can move one square orthogonally backward or diagonally forward.
- Limited range: It can move one to three squares orthogonally sideways.
- Notation: fFbWsR3

		○		○		
○	○	○	☖	○	○	○
			○			

Sword general (刀将)

- Step: The sword general can move one square orthogonally backward.
- Limited range: It can move one to three squares forward, orthogonally or diagonally.
- Notation: bWfQ3

○			○			○
	○		○		○	
		○	○	○		
			☖			
			○			

Fowl officer (禽吏)

- Limited range: The fowl officer can move one or two squares orthogonally forward or sideways; or
- Limited range: It can move one to three squares in the four diagonal directions
- Notation: B3fsR2

○						○
	○		○		○	
		○	○	○		
	○	○	☖	○	○	
		○		○		
	○				○	
○						○

Beast officer (獣吏)

- Limited range: The beast officer can move one or two squares orthogonally sideways.
- Limited range: It can move one to three squares orthogonally forward or in the four diagonal directions.
- Notation: B3sR2fR3

○			○			○
	○		○		○	
		○	○	○		
	○	○	☖	○	○	
		○		○		
	○				○	
○						○

Heavenly tetrarch (四天)

- Limited range: The heavenly tetrarch can move one to four squares in any direction, orthogonal or diagonal.
- Notation: Q4

○				○				○
	○			○			○	
		○		○		○		
			○	○	○			
○	○	○	○	☖	○	○	○	○
			○	○	○			
		○		○		○		
	○			○			○	
○				○				○

Chicken general (鶏将) and pup general (狗将)

- Step: The chicken general and pup general can move one square diagonally backward.
- Limited range: They can move one to four squares orthogonally forward.
- Notation: bFfR4
- They have the same range of movement but promote differently (see above).

	○	
	○	
	○	
	○	
	☖	
○		○

Pig general (豚将)

- Limited range: The pig general can move one or two squares orthogonally backward; or
- Limited range: It can move one to four squares diagonally forward.
- Notation: bR2fB4

○								○
	○						○	
		○				○		
			○		○			
				☖				
				○				
				○				

Mountain stag (山鹿)

- Step: The mountain stag can move one square orthogonally forward.
- Limited range: It can move one or two squares orthogonally sideways.
- Limited range: It can move one to three squares diagonally forward.
- Limited range: It can move one to four squares orthogonally backward.
- Notation: fB3fWsR2bR4

○						○
	○				○	
		○	○	○		
	○	○	☖	○	○	
			○			
			○			
			○			
			○			

Leopard king (豹王)

- Limited range: The leopard king can move one to five squares in any direction, orthogonal or diagonal.
- Notation: Q5

○					○					○
	○				○				○	
		○			○			○		
			○		○		○			
				○	○	○				
○	○	○	○	○	☖	○	○	○	○	○
				○	○	○				
			○		○		○			
		○			○			○		
	○				○				○	
○					○					○

Turtle dove (山鳩)

- Step: The turtle dove can move one square orthogonally backward or sideways.
- Limited range: It can move one to five squares diagonally forward.
- Notation: fB5bsW

○										○
	○								○	
		○						○		
			○				○			
				○		○				
				○	☖	○				
					○					

Crossbow soldier (弓兵)

- Step: The crossbow soldier can move one square orthogonally backward.
- Limited range: It can move one to three squares orthogonally sideways or diagonally forward.
- Limited range: It can move one to five squares orthogonally forward.
- Notation: fB3bWsR3fR5

			○			
			○			
○			○			○
	○		○		○	
		○	○	○		
○	○	○	☖	○	○	○
			○			

Cannon soldier (炮兵)

- Step: The cannon soldier can move one square orthogonally backward.
- Limited range: It can move one to three squares orthogonally sideways.
- Limited range: It can move one to five squares diagonally forward.
- Limited range: It can move one to seven squares orthogonally forward.
- Notation: fB5bWsR3fR7

					○					
					○					
○					○					○
	○				○				○	
		○			○			○		
			○		○		○			
				○	○	○				
		○	○	○	☖	○	○	○		
					○					

Incense chariot (香車), ox chariot (牛車), and fierce tiger (猛虎)

- Ranging: The incense chariot, ox chariot and fierce tiger can move any number of free squares in a straight line orthogonally forward.
- Notation: fR
- They have the same range of movement but promote differently (see above).

│
│
☖

Reverse chariot (反車)

- Ranging: The reverse chariot can move any number of free squares in a straight line orthogonally forward or backward.
- Notation: vR

│
│
☖
│
│

Side dragon (横龍)

- Ranging: The side dragon can move any number of free squares in a straight line orthogonally forward or sideways.
- Notation: fsR

		│		
		│		
─	─	☖	─	─

Mountain witch (山母)

- Range: The mountain witch can move any number of free squares in a straight line backward, or in any diagonal direction.
- Notation: BbR

╲				╱
	╲		╱	
		☖		
	╱	│	╲	
╱		│		╲

White foal (白駒), mocking bird (⿰古寺·⿱時鳥) and multi general (雜将)

- Ranging: The white foal, mocking bird and multi general can move any number of free squares in a straight line orthogonally forward or backward.
- Ranging: They can move any number of free squares in a straight line diagonally forward.
- Notation: vRfB

╲		│		╱
	╲	│	╱	
		☖		
		│		
		│		

Flying chariot (飛車), soldier (兵士), running chariot (走車), square mover (方行) and gliding swallow (燕行)

- Ranging: The flying chariot, soldier, running chariot, square mover and gliding swallow can move any number of free squares in a straight line in the four orthogonal directions.
- They have the same range of motion but promote differently (see above).
- Notation: R

		│		
		│		
─	─	☖	─	─
		│		
		│		

Free serpent (奔蛇), coiled dragon (蟠龍) and whale (鯨鯢)

- Range: The free serpent, the coiled dragon and the whale can move any number of free squares in a straight line orthogonally forward, backward, or diagonally backward.
- Notation: vRbB

		│		
		│		
		☖		
	╱	│	╲	
╱		│		╲

Angle mover (角行)

- Ranging: An angle mover can move any number of free squares in a straight line in the four diagonal directions.
- Notation: B

Because it cannot move orthogonally, an angle mover can only reach half the squares on the board.

╲				╱
	╲		╱	
		☖		
	╱		╲	
╱				╲

Free wolf (奔狼) and running leopard (走豹)

- Range: The free wolf and running leopard can move any number of free squares in a straight line orthogonally forward, sideways or diagonally forward.
- Notation: fBfsR

╲		│		╱
	╲	│	╱	
─	─	☖	─	─

Wizard stork (仙·⿱而鷦)

- Range: The wizard stork can move any number of free squares in a straight line orthogonally sideways, backward or diagonally forward.
- Notation: fBsbR

╲				╱
	╲		╱	
─	─	☖	─	─
		│		
		│		

Flying ox (飛牛), free bear (奔熊), free leopard (奔豹) and great whale (大鯨)

- Ranging: The flying ox, the free bear, the free leopard and the great whale can move any number of free squares in a straight line in the four diagonal directions.
- Ranging: It can move any number of free squares in a straight line orthogonally forward or backward.
- Notation: BvR

╲		│		╱
	╲	│	╱	
		☖		
	╱	│	╲	
╱		│		╲

Treacherous fox (隠狐)

- Ranging: The treacherous fox can move any number of free squares in a straight line orthogonally forward or backward, or in the four diagonal directions.
- Jump and range: It can jump to the second or third square in those directions, then (optionally) continue moving in that direction.
- Notation: BAGvRvDvH(mAmG-B)(mvDmvH-R)

╲				│				╱
	☆			☆			☆	
		☆		☆		☆		
			╲	│	╱			
				☖				
			╱	│	╲			
		☆		☆		☆		
	☆			☆			☆	
╱				│				╲

Cavalier (騎士) and strong chariot (強車)

- Range: The cavalier and strong chariot can move any number of free squares in a straight line diagonally forward or in the four orthogonal directions.
- Notation: RfB

╲		│		╱
	╲	│	╱	
─	─	☖	─	─
		│		
		│		

Free dragon (奔龍) and free tiger (奔虎)

- Range: The free dragon and free tiger can move any number of free squares in a straight line in any direction, orthogonal or diagonal, except orthogonally forward.
- Notation: BbsR

╲				╱
	╲		╱	
─	─	☖	─	─
	╱	│	╲	
╱		│		╲

Free king (奔王), free stag (奔鹿) and strong eagle (勁鷲)

- Ranging: The free king, the free stag and the strong eagle can move any number of free squares in a straight line in any direction, orthogonal or diagonal.
- Notation: Q

╲		│		╱
	╲	│	╱	
─	─	☖	─	─
	╱	│	╲	
╱		│		╲

Howling dog (left and right) (𠵇犬)

- Step: The howling dog can move one square orthogonally backward.
- Ranging: It can move any number of free squares in a straight line orthogonally forward.
- Notation: bWfR
- The left and right howling dogs have the same range of motion but promote differently (see above).

│
│
☖
○

Vertical horse (竪馬)

- Step: The vertical horse can move one square diagonally forward or orthogonally backward.
- Ranging: It can move any number of free squares in a straight line orthogonally forward.
- Notation: fFbWfR

	│	
○	│	○
	☖	
	○	

Spear soldier (鎗兵)

- Step: The spear soldier can move one square orthogonally backward or sideways.
- Ranging: It can move any number of free squares in a straight line orthogonally forward.
- Notation: WfR

	│	
	│	
○	☖	○
	○	

Vertical pup (竪狗)

- Step: The vertical pup can move one square backward, orthogonally or diagonally.
- Ranging: It can move any number of free squares in a straight line orthogonally forward.
- Notation: bFbWfR

	│	
	│	
	☖	
○	○	○

Raiding hawk (延鷹)

- Step: The raiding hawk can move one square diagonally forward.
- Step: The raiding hawk can move one square orthogonally sideways.
- Range: It can move any number of free squares in a straight line orthogonally forward.
- Notation: fFsWfR

	│	
○	│	○
○	☖	○

Right iron chariot (右鉄車)

- Step: The right iron chariot can step one square right.
- Range: It can move any number of free squares in a straight line diagonally backwards in either direction, or in the forward left diagonal.
- Notation: rWbBflB

╲				
	╲			
		☖	○	
	╱		╲	
╱				╲

Left iron chariot (左鉄車)

- Step: The left iron chariot can step one square left.
- Range: It can move any number of free squares in a straight line diagonally backwards in either direction, or in the forward right diagonal.
- Notation: lWbBfrB

				╱
			╱	
	○	☖		
	╱		╲	
╱				╲

Vertical leopard (竪豹)

- Step: The vertical leopard can move one square orthogonally backward, sideways or diagonally forward.
- Ranging: It can move any number of free squares in a straight line orthogonally forward.
- Notation: WfFfR

	│	
○	│	○
○	☖	○
	○	

Right dog (右犬)

- Step: The right dog can move one square orthogonally backward.
- Range: It can move any number of free squares in a straight line orthogonally forward or diagonally backward to the left.
- Notation: bWfRblB

		│
		│
		☖
	╱	○
╱		

Left dog (左犬)

- Step: The left dog can move one square orthogonally backward.
- Range: It can move any number of free squares in a straight line orthogonally forward or diagonally backward to the right.
- Notation: bWfRbrB

│		
│		
☖		
○	╲	
		╲

Ram's-head soldier (羊兵) and Flying swallow (飛燕)

- Ranging: The ram's-head soldier and the flying swallow can move any number of free squares in a straight line diagonally forward.
- Step: It can move one square orthogonally backward.
- Notation: bWfB

╲				╱
	╲		╱	
		☖		
		○		

Wood chariot (木車)

- Step: The wood chariot can move one square diagonally forward to the left or diagonally backward to the right.
- Ranging: It can move any number of free squares in a straight line orthogonally forward or backward.
- Notation: flFbrFvR

	│	
○	│	
	☖	
	│	○
	│	

Tile chariot (瓦車)

- Step: The tile chariot can move one square diagonally forward to the right or diagonally backward to the left.
- Ranging: It can move any number of free squares in a straight line orthogonally forward or backward.
- Notation: frFblFvR

	│	
	│	○
	☖	
○	│	
	│	

Running boar (走猪), Running pup (走狗), running serpent (走蛇), Earth chariot (土車) and vertical mover (竪行).

- Step: The running boar, running pup, running serpent, earth chariot and vertical mover can move one square orthogonally sideways.
- Ranging: They can move any number of free squares in a straight line orthogonally forward or backward.
- They have the same range of movement but promote differently (see above).
- Notation: WvR

	│	
	│	
○	☖	○
	│	
	│	

Fierce ox (猛牛)

- Step: The fierce ox can move one square orthogonally forward or backward.
- Ranging: It can move any number of free squares in a straight line diagonally forward.
- Notation: vWfB

╲				╱
	╲	○	╱	
		☖		
		○		

Side wolf (横狼)

- Step: The side wolf can move one square diagonally forward to the left or diagonally backward to the right.
- Ranging: It can move any number of free squares in a straight line orthogonally sideways.
- Notation: flFbrFsR

	○			
─	─	☖	─	─
			○	

Side ox (横牛)

- Step: The side ox can move one square diagonally forward to the right or diagonally backward to the left.
- Ranging: It can move any number of squares orthogonally sideways.
- Notation: frFblFsR

			○	
─	─	☖	─	─
	○			

Side mover (横行) and swallow's wings (燕羽)

- Ranging: The side mover and the swallow's wings can move any number of free squares in a straight line orthogonally sideways.
- Step: It can move one square orthogonally forward or backward.
- Notation: WsR

		○		
─	─	☖	─	─
		○		

Side monkey (横猿)

- Step: The side monkey can move one square diagonally forward or orthogonally backward.
- Ranging: It can move any number of free squares in a straight line orthogonally sideways.
- Notation: bWfFsR

	○		○	
─	─	☖	─	─
		○		

Divine sparrow (神雀)

- Step: The divine sparrow can move one square diagonally forward to the right or in the four orthogonal directions.
- Range: It can move any number of free squares in a straight line diagonally backward or forward to the left.
- Notation: WfrFflBbB

╲				
	╲	○	○	
	○	☖	○	
	╱	○	╲	
╱				╲

Plodding ox (歬牛)

- Step: The plodding ox can move one square in the four diagonal directions.
- Range: It can move any number of free squares in a straight line orthogonally forward or backward.
- Notation: FvR

	│	
○	│	○
	☖	
○	│	○
	│	

Side flyer (横飛)

- Step: The side flyer can move one square in the four diagonal directions; or
- Ranging: It can move any number of free squares in a straight line orthogonally sideways.
- Notation: FsR

	○		○	
─	─	☖	─	─
	○		○	

Flying stag (飛鹿) and copper elephant (銅象)

- Step: The flying stag and copper elephant can move one square orthogonally sideways or in the four diagonal directions.
- Range: They can move any number of free squares in a straight line orthogonally forward or backward.
- Notation: KvR

	│	
○	│	○
○	☖	○
○	│	○
	│	

Vermillion sparrow (朱雀)

- Step: The vermillion sparrow can move one square in the four orthogonal directions, or diagonally forward to the right or diagonally backward to the left.
- Ranging: It can move any number of free squares in a straight line diagonally forward to the left or diagonally backward to the right.
- Notation: KflBbrB

╲				
	╲	○	○	
	○	☖	○	
	○	○	╲	
				╲

Turtle-snake (玄武)

- Ranging: The turtle-snake can move any number of free squares in a straight line diagonally forward to the right or backward to the left.
- Step: It can move one square in any of the remaining directions.
- Notation: KfrBblB

				╱
	○	○	╱	
	○	☖	○	
	╱	○	○	
╱				

Side boar (横猪)

- Step: The side boar can move one square orthogonally forward or backward; or in the four diagonal directions.
- Ranging: It can move any number of free squares in a straight line orthogonally sideways.
- Notation: KsR

	○	○	○	
─	─	☖	─	─
	○	○	○	

Left chariot (左車)

- Ranging: The left chariot can move any number of free squares in a straight line orthogonally forward.
- Ranging: It can move any number of free squares in a straight line diagonally forward to the right.
- Ranging: It can move any number of free squares in a straight line diagonally backward to the left.
- Step: It can move one square orthogonally left.
- Notation: lWfRfrBblB

		│		╱
		│	╱	
	○	☖		
	╱			
╱				

Right chariot (右車)

- Ranging: The right chariot can move any number of free squares in a straight line orthogonally forward.
- Ranging: It can move any number of free squares in a straight line diagonally forward to the left.
- Ranging: It can move any number of free squares in a straight line diagonally backward to the right.
- Step: It can move one square orthogonally right.
- Notation: rWfRflBbrB

╲		│		
	╲	│		
		☖	○	
			╲	
				╲

Great tiger (大虎)

- Step: The great tiger can move one square orthogonally forward.
- Range: It can move any number of free squares in a straight line orthogonally sideways or backward.
- Notation: WbsR

		○		
─	─	☖	─	─
		│		
		│		

Right tiger (右虎)

- Step: The right tiger can move one square diagonally right.
- Ranging: It can move any number of free squares in a straight line orthogonally left or diagonally left.
- Notation: FlQ

╲			
	╲		○
─	─	☖	
	╱		○
╱			

Left tiger (左虎)

- Step: The left tiger can move one square diagonally left.
- Ranging: It can move any number of free squares in a straight line orthogonally right or diagonally right.
- Notation: FrQ

			╱
○		╱	
	☖	─	─
○		╲	
			╲

Great bear (大熊)

- Step: The great bear can move one square orthogonally sideways or backward.
- Range: It can move any number of free squares in a straight line forward, orthogonally or diagonally.
- Notation: WfQ

╲		│		╱
	╲	│	╱	
	○	☖	○	
		○		

Running rabbit (走兎)

- Step: The running rabbit can move one square orthogonally or diagonally backward.
- Ranging: It can move any number of free squares in a straight line orthogonally or diagonally forward.
- Notation: bKfQ

╲		│		╱
	╲	│	╱	
		☖		
	○	○	○	

Left army (左軍)

- Step: The left army can move one square orthogonally forward, backward, right or diagonally right.
- Range: It can move any number of free squares in a straight line left, orthogonally or diagonally.
- Notation: KlQ

╲			
	╲	○	○
─	─	☖	○
	╱	○	○
╱			

Right army (右軍)

- Step: The right army can move one square orthogonally forward, backward, left or diagonally left.
- Range: It can move any number of free squares in a straight line right, orthogonally or diagonally.
- Notation: KrQ

			╱
○	○	╱	
○	☖	─	─
○	○	╲	
			╲

Divine turtle (神亀)

- Step: The divine turtle can move one square diagonally forward to the left or in the four orthogonal directions.
- Range: It can move any number of free squares in a straight line along either rear diagonal, or diagonally forward to the right.
- Notation: KfrBbB

				╱
	○	○	╱	
	○	☖	○	
	╱	○	╲	
╱				╲

Running wolf (走狼)

- Step: The running wolf can move one square orthogonally forward.
- Ranging: It can move any number of free squares in a straight line orthogonally sideways or diagonally forward.
- Notation: fWfBsR

╲				╱
	╲	○	╱	
─	─	☖	─	─

Flying hawk (飛鷹)

- Step: The flying hawk can move one square orthogonally forward.
- Range: It can move any number of squares in the four diagonal directions.
- Notation: BfW

╲				╱
	╲	○	╱	
		☖		
	╱		╲	
╱				╲

Cannon chariot (炮車)

- Step: The cannon chariot can move one square orthogonally sideways.
- Range: It can move any number of free squares in a straight line orthogonally forward, backward or diagonally forward.
- Notation: WfBvR

╲		│		╱
	╲	│	╱	
	○	☖	○	
		│		
		│		

Dragon king (龍王)

- Ranging: A dragon king can move any number of free squares in a straight line in the four orthogonal directions.
- Step: It can move one square in the four diagonal directions.
- Notation: RF

		│		
	○	│	○	
─	─	☖	─	─
	○	│	○	
		│		

Dragon horse (龍馬)

- Ranging: A dragon horse can move any number of free squares in a straight line in the four diagonal directions.
- Step: It can move one square in the four orthogonal directions.
- Notation: WB

╲				╱
	╲	○	╱	
	○	☖	○	
	╱	○	╲	
╱				╲

Free boar (奔猪)

- Step: The free boar can move one square orthogonally backward.
- Range: It can move any number of free squares in a straight line orthogonally forward, sideways or diagonally forward.
- Notation: WfsRfB

╲		│		╱
	╲	│	╱	
─	─	☖	─	─
		○		

Wind dragon (風龍)

- Step: The wind dragon can move one square diagonally backward to the left.
- Ranging: It can move any number of free squares in a straight line orthogonally sideways, diagonally forward or diagonally backward to the right.
- Notation: FfBbrBsR

╲				╱
	╲		╱	
─	─	☖	─	─
	○		╲	
				╲

Cloud dragon (雲龍)

- Step: The cloud dragon can move one square orthogonally forward or sideways.
- Ranging: It can move any number of free squares in a straight line orthogonally backward or in the four diagonal directions.
- Notation: BWbR

╲				╱
	╲	○	╱	
	○	☖	○	
	╱	│	╲	
╱		│		╲

Rain dragon (雨龍)

- Step: The rain dragon can move one square orthogonally or diagonally forward.
- Ranging: It can move any number of free squares in a straight line orthogonally sideways or backward; or diagonally backward.
- Notation: WbsRFbB

	○	○	○	
─	─	☖	─	─
	╱	│	╲	
╱		│		╲

Fire ox (火牛) and fierce wind (暴風)

- Step: The fire ox and fierce wind can move one square orthogonally sideways.
- Range: They can move any number of free squares in a straight line orthogonally backward, forward or in the four diagonal directions.
- Notation: vQW

╲		│		╱
	╲	│	╱	
	○	☖	○	
	╱	│	╲	
╱		│		╲

Huai river (淮川)

- Step: The Huai river can move one square orthogonally forward or backward.
- Range: It can move any number of free squares in a straight line orthogonally sideways or in the four diagonal directions.
- Notation: WsQ

╲				╱
	╲	○	╱	
─	─	☖	─	─
	╱	○	╲	
╱				╲

Vertical tiger (竪虎)

- Limited range: The vertical tiger can move one or two squares orthogonally backward.
- Ranging: It can move any number of free squares in a straight line orthogonally forward.
- Notation: fRbR2

│
│
│
☖
○
○

Wind snapping turtle (風鼈)

- Limited range: The wind snapping turtle can move one or two squares diagonally forward.
- Range: It can move any number of free squares in a straight line orthogonally forward or backward.
- Notation: fB2vR

		│		
○		│		○
	○	│	○	
		☖		
		│		
		│		
		│		

Running tile (走瓦), Running tiger (走虎) and running bear (走熊)

- Limited range: The running tile, running tiger and running bear can move one or two squares orthogonally sideways.
- Ranging: They can move any number of free squares in a straight line orthogonally forward or backward.
- They have the same range of movement but promote differently (see above).
- Notation: vRsR2

		│		
		│		
○	○	☖	○	○
		│		
		│		

Gold stag (金鹿)

- Ranging: The gold stag can move any number of free squares in a straight line diagonally forward.
- Limited range: It can move one or two squares diagonally backward.
- Notation: fBbB2

╲						╱
	╲				╱	
		╲		╱		
			☖			
		○		○		
	○				○	

Silver rabbit (銀兎)

- Limited range: The silver rabbit can move one or two squares diagonally forward.
- Ranging: It can move any number of free squares in a straight line diagonally backward.
- Notation: fB2bB

	○				○	
		○		○		
			☖			
		╱		╲		
	╱				╲	
╱						╲

Walking heron (歩䳲)

- Limited range: The walking heron can move one or two squares orthogonally sideways or diagonally forward.
- Range: It can move any number of free squares in a straight line orthogonally forward or backward.
- Notation: sR2fB2vR

		│		
○		│		○
	○	│	○	
○	○	☖	○	○
		│		
		│		
		│		

Reed bird (芦鳥)

- Limited range: The reed bird can move one or two squares orthogonally sideways or diagonally backward.
- Range: It can move any number of free squares in a straight line orthogonally forward or backward.
- Notation: sR2bB2vR

		│		
		│		
		│		
○	○	☖	○	○
	○	│	○	
○		│		○
		│		

Right dragon (右龍)

- Limited range: The right dragon can move one or two squares orthogonally right.
- Ranging: It can move any number of free squares in a straight line orthogonally left or diagonally left.
- Notation: rR2lQ

	╲				
		╲			
─	─	─	☖	○	○
		╱			
	╱				

Left dragon (左龍)

- Limited range: The left dragon can move one or two squares orthogonally left.
- Ranging: It can move any number of free squares in a straight line orthogonally right or diagonally right.
- Notation: lR2rQ

				╱	
			╱		
○	○	☖	─	─	─
			╲		
				╲	

Blue dragon (青龍)

- Ranging: The blue dragon can move any number of free squares in a straight line orthogonally forward or backward, or diagonally forward to the right.
- Limited range: It can move one or two squares orthogonally sideways.
- Notation: sR2vRfrB

		│		╱
		│	╱	
○	○	☖	○	○
		│		
		│		

White tiger (白虎)

- Ranging: The white tiger can move any number of free squares in a straight line orthogonally sideways, or diagonally forward to the left.
- Limited range: It can move one or two squares orthogonally forward or backward.
- Notation: vR2sRflB

╲						
	╲		○			
		╲	○			
─	─	─	☖	─	─	─
			○			
			○			

Divine tiger (神虎)

- Limited range: The divine tiger can move one or two squares orthogonally backward.
- Range: It can move any number of free squares in a straight line orthogonally forward, sideways, or diagonally forward to the left.
- Notation: bR2fsRflB

		│		
╲		│		
	╲	│		
─	─	☖	─	─
		○		
		○		

Divine dragon (神龍)

- Limited range: The divine dragon can move one or two squares orthogonally left.
- Range: It can move any number of free squares in a straight line orthogonally forward, right, backward or diagonally forward to the right.
- Notation: lR2vrRfrB

		│		╱	
		│	╱		
○	○	☖	─	─	─
		│			
		│			

Running stag (走鹿)

- Limited range: The running stag can move one or two squares orthogonally backward.
- Ranging: It can move any number of free squares in a straight line orthogonally sideways or diagonally forward.
- Notation: bR2sRfB

╲				╱
	╲		╱	
─	─	☖	─	─
		○		
		○		

Rear standard (後旗)

- Limited range: The rear standard can move one or two squares diagonally.
- Ranging: It can move any number of free squares in a straight line orthogonally
- Notation: B2R

			│			
	○		│		○	
		○	│	○		
─	─	─	☖	─	─	─
		○	│	○		
	○		│		○	
			│			

Ceramic dove (鳩盤) and Elephant king (象王)

- Limited range: The ceramic dove and the elephant king can move one or two squares in the four orthogonal directions.
- Ranging: It can move any number of free squares in a straight line in the four diagonal directions
- Notation: R2B

╲						╱
	╲		○		╱	
		╲	○	╱		
	○	○	☖	○	○	
		╱	○	╲		
	╱		○		╲	
╱						╲

Horseman (騎兵) and great foal (大駒)

- Limited range: The horseman and the great foal can move one or two squares orthogonally sideways or backward.
- Ranging: It can move any number of free squares in a straight line orthogonally forward or backward, or diagonally forward.
- Notation: sR2vRfB

╲			│			╱
	╲		│		╱	
		╲	│	╱		
	○	○	☖	○	○	
			│			
			│			
			│			

Woodland demon (林鬼), free chicken (奔鶏) and free dog (奔犬)

- Limited range: The woodland demon, the free chicken and the free dog can move one or two squares orthogonally sideways or diagonally backward.
- Range: It can move any number of free squares in a straight line orthogonally forward, backward or diagonally forward.
- Notation: sR2bB2vRfB

╲			│			╱
	╲		│		╱	
		╲	│	╱		
	○	○	☖	○	○	
		○	│	○		
	○		│		○	
			│			

Running ox (走牛)

- Limited range: The running ox can move one or two squares backward.
- Range: It can move any number of free squares in a straight line orthogonally forward, sideways or diagonally forward.
- Notation: bR2fsRfB

╲			│			╱
	╲		│		╱	
		╲	│	╱		
─	─	─	☖	─	─	─
			○			
			○			

Chariot soldier (車兵)

- Limited range: The chariot soldier can move one or two squares orthogonally sideways.
- Ranging: It can move any number of free squares in a straight line orthogonally forward, orthogonally backward or in the four diagonal directions.
- Notation: sR2vQ

╲		│		╱
	╲	│	╱	
○	○	☖	○	○
	╱	│	╲	
╱		│		╲

Fire demon (火鬼) and Water ox (水牛)

- Limited range: The fire demon and water ox can move one or two squares orthogonally forward or backward.
- Ranging: They can move any number of free squares in a straight line orthogonally sideways or in the four diagonal directions.
- Notation: vR2sQ

The fire demon cannot burn other pieces as in tenjiku shogi.

╲						╱
	╲		○		╱	
		╲	○	╱		
─	─	─	☖	─	─	─
		╱	○	╲		
	╱		○		╲	
╱						╲

Strong bear (強熊)

- Limited range: The strong bear can move one or two squares orthogonally backward.
- Ranging: It can move any number of free squares in a straight line orthogonally forward, sideways or in the four diagonal directions.
- Notation: bR2fsQ

		│		
╲		│		╱
	╲	│	╱	
─	─	☖	─	─
	╱	○	╲	
╱		○		╲

Wind horse (風馬)

- Step: The wind horse can move one square diagonally forward.
- Limited range: It can move one or two squares orthogonally backward.
- Ranging: It can move any number of free squares in a straight line orthogonally forward.
- Notation: fFbR2fR

	│	
	│	
○	│	○
	☖	
	○	
	○	

Vertical bear (竪熊) and Vertical soldier (竪兵)

- Step: The vertical bear and vertical soldier can move one square orthogonally backward.
- Limited range: They can move one or two squares orthogonally sideways.
- Ranging: They can move any number of free squares in a straight line orthogonally forward.
- Notation: bWsR2fR

		│		
		│		
○	○	☖	○	○
		○		

Tiger soldier (虎兵)

- Step: The tiger soldier can move one square orthogonally backward.
- Limited range: It can move one or two squares orthogonally forward.
- Range: It can move any number of free squares in a straight line diagonally forward.
- Notation: bWfR2fB

╲		○		╱
	╲	○	╱	
		☖		
		○		

Earth dragon (地龍)

- Step: The earth dragon can move one square orthogonally backward or diagonally forward.
- Limited range: It can move one or two squares orthogonally forward.
- Ranging: It can move any number of free squares in a straight line diagonally backward.
- Notation: fFbWfR2bB

			○			
		○	○	○		
			☖			
		╱	○	╲		
	╱				╲	
╱						╲

Silver chariot (銀車)

- Step: The silver chariot can move one square diagonally backward.
- Limited range: It can move one or two squares diagonally forward.
- Ranging: It can move any number of free squares in a straight line orthogonally forward or backward.
- Notation: bFfB2vR

		│		
○		│		○
	○	│	○	
		☖		
	○	│	○	
		│		
		│		

Stone chariot (石車)

- Step: The stone chariot can move one square diagonally forward.
- Limited range: It can move one or two squares orthogonally sideways.
- Ranging: It can move any number of squares orthogonally forward or backward.
- Notation: fFsR2vR

		│		
	○	│	○	
○	○	☖	○	○
		│		
		│		

Side soldier (横兵)

- Step: The side soldier can move one square orthogonally backward.
- Limited range: It can move one or two squares orthogonally forward.
- Ranging: It can move any number of free squares in a straight line orthogonally sideways.
- Notation: bWfR2sR

		○		
		○		
─	─	☖	─	─
		○		

Gold chariot (金車)

- Step: The gold chariot can move one square in the four diagonal directions.
- Limited range: It can move one or two squares orthogonally sideways.
- Ranging: It can move any number of free squares in a straight line orthogonally forward or backward.
- Notation: FsR2vR

		│		
	○	│	○	
○	○	☖	○	○
	○	│	○	
		│		

Boar soldier (猪兵), leopard soldier (豹兵) and bear soldier (熊兵)

- Step: The boar soldier, leopard soldier and bear soldier can move one square orthogonally backward.
- Limited range: They can move one or two squares orthogonally sideways.
- Ranging: They can move any number of free squares in a straight line forward, orthogonally or diagonally.
- Notation: bWsR2fQ

╲		│		╱
	╲	│	╱	
○	○	☖	○	○
		○		

Free pup (奔狗), free ox (奔牛), free horse (奔馬) and free pig (奔豚)

- Step: The free pup, the free ox, the free horse and the free pig can move one square diagonally backward.
- Limited range: It can move one or two squares orthogonally sideways.
- Ranging: It can move any number of free squares in a straight line orthogonally forward or backward; or diagonally forward.
- Notation: FsR2vRfB

╲		│		╱
	╲	│	╱	
○	○	☖	○	○
	○	│	○	
		│		

Little standard (小旗)

- Step: The little standard can move one square diagonally backward.
- Limited range: It can move one or two squares diagonally forward.
- Ranging: It can move any number of free squares in a straight line in the four orthogonal directions.
- Notation: RfB2bF

			│			
	○		│		○	
		○	│	○		
─	─	─	☖	─	─	─
		○	│	○		
			│			
			│			

Copper chariot (銅車)

- Limited range: The copper chariot can move one to three squares diagonally forward.
- Ranging: It can move any number of free squares in a straight line orthogonally forward or backward.
- Notation: fB3vR

			│			
○			│			○
	○		│		○	
		○	│	○		
			☖			
			│			
			│			
			│			
			│			

Forest demon (森鬼)

- Limited range: The forest demon can move one to three squares orthogonally forward or sideways.
- Ranging: It can move any number of free squares in a straight line orthogonally backward or diagonally forward.
- Notation: fsR3fBbR

╲								╱
	╲			○			╱	
		╲		○		╱		
			╲	○	╱			
	○	○	○	☖	○	○	○	
				│				
				│				
				│				
				│				

Great dragon (大龍)

- Limited range: The great dragon can move one to three squares orthogonally forward or backward.
- Ranging: It can move any number of free squares in a straight line in the four diagonal directions.
- Notation: BvR3

		○		
╲		○		╱
	╲	○	╱	
		☖		
	╱	○	╲	
╱		○		╲
		○		

Center standard (中旗) and front standard (前旗)

- Limited range: The center standard and front standard can move one to three squares in the four diagonal directions.
- Ranging: They can move any number of free squares in a straight line in the four orthogonal directions.
- They have the same range of movement but promote differently (see above). Uniquely, when a center standard promotes to a front standard, it gains no new abilities.
- Notation: B3R

				│				
	○			│			○	
		○		│		○		
			○	│	○			
─	─	─	─	☖	─	─	─	─
			○	│	○			
		○		│		○		
	○			│			○	
				│				

Great dove (大鳩)

- Limited range: The great dove can move one to three squares in the four orthogonal directions.
- Ranging: It can move any number of free squares in a straight line in the four diagonal directions.
- Notation: R3B

╲								╱
	╲			○			╱	
		╲		○		╱		
			╲	○	╱			
	○	○	○	☖	○	○	○	
			╱	○	╲			
		╱		○		╲		
	╱			○			╲	
╱								╲

Great standard (大旗)

- Limited range: The great standard can move one to three squares diagonally backward.
- Ranging: It can move any number of free squares in a straight line diagonally forward or in the four orthogonal directions.
- Notation: RbB3fB

╲				│				╱
	╲			│			╱	
		╲		│		╱		
			╲	│	╱			
─	─	─	─	☖	─	─	─	─
			○	│	○			
		○		│		○		
	○			│			○	
				│				

Vertical wolf (竪狼)

- Step: The vertical wolf can move one square orthogonally sideways.
- Limited range: It can move one to three squares orthogonally backward.
- Ranging: It can move any number of free squares in a straight line orthogonally forward.
- Notation: sWbR3fR

	│	
	│	
	│	
	│	
○	☖	○
	○	
	○	
	○	

Side serpent (横蛇)

- Step: The side serpent can move one square orthogonally backward.
- Limited range: It can move one to three squares orthogonally forward.
- Ranging: It can move any number of free squares in a straight line orthogonally sideways.
- Notation: bWfR3sR

		○		
		○		
		○		
─	─	☖	─	─
		○		

Cloud eagle (雲鷲)

- Step: The cloud eagle can move one square orthogonally sideways.
- Limited range: It can move one to three squares diagonally forward.
- Ranging: It can move any number of free squares in a straight line orthogonally forward or backward.
- Notation: sWfF3vWW

			│			
○			│			○
	○		│		○	
		○	│	○		
		○	☖	○		
			│			
			│			
			│			
			│			

Goose wing (鴻翼)

- Step: The goose wing can move one square in the four diagonal directions.
- Limited range: It can move one, two or three squares orthogonally sideways.
- Range: It can move any number of squares orthogonally forward or backward.
- Notation: FsW3vWW

			│			
		○	│	○		
○	○	○	☖	○	○	○
		○	│	○		
			│			

Horse soldier (馬兵) and ox soldier (牛兵)

- Step: The horse soldier and ox soldier can move one square orthogonally backward.
- Limited range: They can move one to three squares orthogonally sideways.
- Ranging: They can move any number of free squares in a straight line forward, orthogonally or diagonally.
- They have the same range of movement but promote differently (see above).
- Notation: bWsR3fQ

	╲		│		╱	
		╲	│	╱		
○	○	○	☖	○	○	○
			○			

Spear general (鎗将)

- Limited range: The spear general can move one or two squares orthogonally backward.
- Limited range: It can move one, two or three squares orthogonally sideways.
- Range: It can move any number of free squares in a straight line orthogonally forward.
- Notation: bR2sR3fR

			│			
			│			
			│			
○	○	○	☖	○	○	○
			○			
			○			

Cannon general (炮将)

- Limited range: The cannon general can move one or two squares orthogonally backward.
- Limited range: It can move one to three squares orthogonally sideways.
- Range: It can move any number of free squares in a straight line forward, orthogonally or diagonally.
- Notation: bR2sR3fQ

╲			│			╱
	╲		│		╱	
		╲	│	╱		
○	○	○	☖	○	○	○
			○			
			○			

Beast bird (獣鳥) and fowl (禽鳥)

- Limited range: The beast bird and fowl can move one or two squares orthogonally backward.
- Limited range: They can move one to three squares orthogonally sideways.
- Range: They can move any number of free squares in a straight line orthogonally forward or in the four diagonal directions.
- Notation: BbR2sR3fR

╲			│			╱
	╲		│		╱	
		╲	│	╱		
○	○	○	☖	○	○	○
		╱	○	╲		
	╱		○		╲	
╱						╲

Great leopard (大豹)

- Step: The great leopard can move one square orthogonally backward.
- Limited range: It can move one or two squares orthogonally sideways.
- Limited range: It can move one, two or three squares diagonally forward.
- Ranging: It can move any number of free squares in a straight line orthogonally forward.
- Notation: bWsR2fRfB3

			│			
○			│			○
	○		│		○	
		○	│	○		
	○	○	☖	○	○	
			○			

Longbow soldier (弩兵)

- Step: The longbow soldier can move one square orthogonally backward.
- Limited range: It can move one or two squares orthogonally sideways.
- Limited range: It can move one to five squares diagonally forward.
- Ranging: It can move any number of free squares in a straight line orthogonally forward.
- Notation: bWsR2fRfB5

					│					
○					│					○
	○				│				○	
		○			│			○		
			○		│		○			
				○	│	○				
			○	○	☖	○	○			
					○					

Thunder runner (雷走)

- Limited range: The thunder runner can move one to four squares orthogonally sideways or backward.
- Range: It can move any number of free squares in a straight line forward, orthogonally or diagonally.
- Notation: bsR4fQ

╲					│					╱
	╲				│				╱	
		╲			│			╱		
			╲		│		╱			
				╲	│	╱				
	○	○	○	○	☖	○	○	○	○	
					○					
					○					
					○					
					○					

Fire dragon (火龍)

- Limited range: The fire dragon can move one or two squares diagonally backward.
- Limited range: It can move one to four squares diagonally forward.
- Ranging: It can move any number of free squares in a straight line in the four orthogonal directions.
- Notation: RbB2fB4

					│					
	○				│				○	
		○			│			○		
			○		│		○			
				○	│	○				
─	─	─	─	─	☖	─	─	─	─	─
				○	│	○				
			○		│		○			
					│					
					│					
					│					

Water dragon (水龍)

- Limited range: The water dragon can move one or two squares diagonally forward.
- Limited range: It can move one to four squares diagonally backward.
- Ranging: It can move any number of free squares in a straight line in the four orthogonal directions.
- Notation: RfB2bB4

					│					
					│					
					│					
			○		│		○			
				○	│	○				
─	─	─	─	─	☖	─	─	─	─	─
				○	│	○				
			○		│		○			
		○			│			○		
	○				│				○	
					│					

Longbow general (弩将)

- Limited range: The longbow general can move one to five squares orthogonally sideways.
- Range: It can move any number of free squares in a straight line orthogonally forward, backward or diagonally forward.
- Notation: fBvRsR5

			╲		│		╱			
				╲	│	╱				
○	○	○	○	○	☖	○	○	○	○	○
					│					
					│					

Stone peng (石鵬)

- Limited range: The stone peng can move one to five squares orthogonally sideways.
- Range: It can move any number of free squares in a straight line in the four diagonal directions.
- Notation: BsR5

			╲				╱			
				╲		╱				
○	○	○	○	○	☖	○	○	○	○	○
				╱		╲				
			╱				╲			

Mount Tai (泰山)

- Limited range: Mount Tai can move one to five squares orthogonally forward or sideways.
- Range: It can move any number of free squares in a straight line in the four diagonal directions.
- Notation: BfsR5

╲												╱
	╲					○					╱	
		╲				○				╱		
			╲			○			╱			
				╲		○		╱				
					╲	○	╱					
	○	○	○	○	○	☖	○	○	○	○	○	
					╱		╲					
				╱				╲				
			╱						╲			
		╱								╲		
	╱										╲	
╱												╲

Free demon (奔鬼)

- Limited range: The free demon can move one to five squares orthogonally forward or backward.
- Ranging: It can move any number of free squares in a straight line in the four diagonal directions or orthogonally sideways.
- Notation: BvR5sR

		○		
		○		
		○		
╲		○		╱
	╲	○	╱	
─	─	☖	─	─
	╱	○	╲	
╱		○		╲
		○		
		○		
		○		

Free dream-eater (奔獏)

- Ranging: The free dream-eater can move any number of free squares in a straight line in the four diagonal directions.
- Ranging: It can move any number of free squares in a straight line orthogonally forward or backward.
- Limited range: It can move one to five squares orthogonally sideways.
- Notation: vQsR5

			╲		│		╱			
				╲	│	╱				
○	○	○	○	○	☖	○	○	○	○	○
				╱	│	╲				
			╱		│		╲			

Free fire (奔火)

- Limited range: The free fire can move one to five squares orthogonally forward or backward.
- Range: It can move any number of free squares in a straight line orthogonally sideways or in the four diagonal directions.
- Notation: sQvR5

		○		
		○		
		○		
╲		○		╱
	╲	○	╱	
─	─	☖	─	─
	╱	○	╲	
╱		○		╲
		○		
		○		
		○		

Running dragon (走龍)

- Limited range: The running dragon can move one to five squares orthogonally backward.
- Range: It can move any number of free squares in a straight line orthogonally forward, sideways or in the four diagonal directions.
- Notation: fsQbR5

		│		
		│		
		│		
		│		
╲		│		╱
	╲	│	╱	
─	─	☖	─	─
	╱	○	╲	
╱		○		╲
		○		
		○		
		○		

Great shark (大鱗)

- Limited range: The shark can move one or two squares diagonally backward.
- Limited range: It can move one to five squares diagonally forward.
- Range: It can move any number of free squares in a straight line in the four orthogonal directions.
- Notation: RbB2fB5

						│						
	○					│					○	
		○				│				○		
			○			│			○			
				○		│		○				
					○	│	○					
─	─	─	─	─	─	☖	─	─	─	─	─	─
					○	│	○					
				○		│		○				
						│						
						│						
						│						
						│						

Crossbow general (弓将)

- Limited range: The crossbow general can move one or two squares orthogonally backward.
- Limited range: It can move one to three squares orthogonally sideways.
- Limited range: It can move one to five squares diagonally forward.
- Range: It can move any number of free squares in a straight line orthogonally forward.
- Notation: bR2sR3fRfB5

					│					
○					│					○
	○				│				○	
		○			│			○		
			○		│		○			
				○	│	○				
		○	○	○	☖	○	○	○		
					○					
					○					

Playful parrot (遊䳇)

- Limited range: The playful parrot can move one or two squares diagonally backward.
- Limited range: It can move one to three squares diagonally forward.
- Limited range: It can move one to five squares orthogonally sideways.
- Range: It can move any number of free squares in a straight line orthogonally forward or backward.
- Notation: bB2fB3sR5vR

					│					
		○			│			○		
			○		│		○			
				○	│	○				
○	○	○	○	○	☖	○	○	○	○	○
				○	│	○				
			○		│		○			
					│					
					│					

Cassia horse (桂馬)

- Jump: A cassia horse jumps at an angle intermediate between orthogonal and diagonal, amounting to one square forward plus one square diagonally forward, in a single motion. That is, it has a choice of two forward destinations.
- The cassia horse ignores intervening pieces on the way to its destination, though its destination square must of course be either empty, or occupied by an opponent's piece (in which case the opponent's piece is captured), just as with any other moving piece.
- Notation: ffN

☆		☆
	☖	

Flying dragon (飛龍)

- Jump: The flying dragon can jump to the second square in the four diagonal directions.
- Because it cannot move orthogonally or to every diagonal square, a flying dragon can only reach one eighth of the squares on the board.
- Notation: A

☆		☆
	☖	
☆		☆

Kirin (麒麟)

- Step: A kirin can move one square orthogonally forward or backward, or in the four diagonal directions.
- Jump: It can jump to the second square orthogonally sideways.
- Notation: FvWsD

	○	○	○	
☆		☖		☆
	○	○	○	

Phoenix (鳳凰)

- Step: The phoenix can move one square in the four orthogonal directions.
- Jump: It can jump to the second square in the four diagonal directions.
- Notation: WA

☆				☆
		○		
	○	☖	○	
		○		
☆				☆

Flying cat (飛猫)

- Step: The flying cat can move one square orthogonally backward or diagonally backward.
- Jump: It can jump to the third square orthogonally forward or sideways, or diagonally forward.
- Notation: bWbFfsHfG

☆		☆		☆
☆		☖		☆
	○	○	○	

Running horse (走馬)

- Step: The running horse can move one square orthogonally backward.
- Ranging: It can move any number of free squares in a straight line orthogonally or diagonally forward.
- Jump: It can jump to the second square diagonally backwards.
- Notation: bWbAfQ

╲			│			╱
	╲		│		╱	
		╲	│	╱		
			☖			
			○			
	☆				☆	

Mountain hawk (山鷹)

- Limited range: The mountain hawk can move one or two squares diagonally backward.
- Jump: It can jump to the second square orthogonally forward.
- Ranging: It can move any number of free squares in a straight line in the four orthogonal directions or diagonally forward.
- Notation: fDbB2RfB

╲			│			╱
	╲		☆		╱	
		╲	│	╱		
─	─	─	☖	─	─	─
		○	│	○		
	○		│		○	
			│			

Little turtle (小亀)

- Limited range: The little turtle can move one or two squares orthogonally sideways.
- Jump: It can jump to the second square orthogonally forward or backward.
- Ranging: It can move any number of free squares in a straight line orthogonally forward or backward, or in the four diagonal directions.
- Notation: vQsR2vD

╲			|			╱
	╲		☆		╱	
		╲	│	╱		
	○	○	☖	○	○	
		╱	│	╲		
	╱		☆		╲	
╱			│			╲

Great stag (大鹿)

- Limited range: The great stag can move one or two squares diagonally backward.
- Jump: It can jump to the second square diagonally forward.
- Ranging: It can move any number of free squares in a straight line in the four orthogonal directions.
- Notation: RfAbB2

			│			
	☆		│		☆	
			│			
─	─	─	☖	─	─	─
		○	│	○		
	○		│		○	
			│			

Left mountain eagle (左山鷲)

- Limited range: The left mountain eagle can move one or two squares diagonally backward to the right.
- Jump: It can jump to the second square along either left diagonal.
- Ranging: It can move any number of free squares in a straight line diagonally left, diagonally forward to the right, or in the four orthogonal directions.
- Notation: RlAfBblBbrB2

╲			│			╱
	☆		│		╱	
		╲	│	╱		
─	─	─	☖	─	─	─
		╱	│	○		
	☆		│		○	
╱			│			

Right mountain eagle (右山鷲)

- Limited range: The right mountain eagle can move one or two squares diagonally backward to the left.
- Jump: It can jump to the second square along either right diagonal.
- Ranging: It can move any number of free squares in a straight line diagonally right, diagonally forward to the left, or in the four orthogonal directions.
- Notation: RrAblB2fBbrB

╲			│			╱
	╲		│		☆	
		╲	│	╱		
─	─	─	☖	─	─	─
		○	│	╲		
	○		│		☆	
			│			╲

Kirin master (麟師) and Great turtle (大亀)

- Limited range: The kirin master and great turtle can move one to three squares orthogonally sideways.
- Range: They can move any number of free squares in a straight line diagonally or orthogonally forward or backward.
- Jump: They can jump to the third square orthogonally forward or backward.
- Notation: vQvHsR3

╲				│				╱
	╲			☆			╱	
		╲		│		╱		
			╲	│	╱			
	○	○	○	☖	○	○	○	
			╱	│	╲			
		╱		│		╲		
	╱			☆			╲	
╱				│				╲

Phoenix master (鳳師)

- Limited range: The phoenix master can move one to three squares orthogonally sideways.
- Range: It can move any number of free squares in a straight line diagonally or orthogonally forward or backward.
- Jump: It can jump to the third square diagonally forward.
- Notation: vQfGsR3

╲				│				╱
	☆			│			☆	
		╲		│		╱		
			╲	│	╱			
	○	○	○	☖	○	○	○	
			╱	│	╲			
		╱		│		╲		
	╱			│			╲	
╱				│				╲

Great master (大師)

- Limited range: The great master can move one to five squares orthogonally sideways or diagonally backward.
- Jump: It can jump to the third square forward, orthogonally or diagonally.
- Ranging: It can move any number of free squares in a straight line forward, orthogonally or diagonally, or orthogonally backward.
- Notation: fGfHbB5sR5fBvR

╲						│						╱
	╲					│					╱	
		╲				│				╱		
			☆			☆			☆			
				╲		│		╱				
					╲	│	╱					
	○	○	○	○	○	☖	○	○	○	○	○	
					○	│	○					
				○		│		○				
			○			│			○			
		○				│				○		
	○					│					○	
						│						

Horned hawk (角鷹)

- Ranging: The horned hawk can move as a queen.
- Jump: It can jump to the second square orthogonally forward.
- Notation: QfD

╲			│			╱
	╲		☆		╱	
		╲	│	╱		
─	─	─	☖	─	─	─
		╱	│	╲		
	╱		│		╲	
╱			│			╲

Flying eagle (飛鷲)

- Jump: The flying eagle can jump to the second square diagonally forward.
- Ranging: It can move any number of free squares in a straight line in any direction, orthogonally or diagonally.
- Notation: QfA

╲			│			╱
	☆		│		☆	
		╲	│	╱		
─	─	─	☖	─	─	─
		╱	│	╲		
	╱		│		╲	
╱			│			╲

Roaring dog (吼犬)

- Limited range: The roaring dog can move one to three squares diagonally backward.
- Jump: It can jump to the third square diagonally forward or in the four orthogonal directions.
- Ranging: It can move any number of free squares in a straight line diagonally forward or in the four orthogonal directions.
- Notation: HfGRbB3fB

╲				│				╱
	☆			☆			☆	
		╲		│		╱		
			╲	│	╱			
─	☆	─	─	☖	─	─	☆	─
			○	│	○			
		○		│		○		
	○			☆			○	
				│				

Lion dog (狛犬)

- Jump: The lion dog can jump to the third square in any direction, orthogonally or diagonally.
- Ranging: It can move any number of free squares in a straight line in any direction, orthogonally or diagonally.
- Notation: QHG

╲				│				╱
	☆			☆			☆	
		╲		│		╱		
			╲	│	╱			
─	☆	─	─	☖	─	─	☆	─
			╱	│	╲			
		╱		│		╲		
	☆			☆			☆	
╱				│				╲

Great dream-eater (大獏)

- Jump: The great dream-eater can jump to the third square orthogonally sideways.
- Range: It can move any number of free squares in a straight line in any direction, orthogonally or diagonally.
- Notation: QsH

		╲		│		╱		
			╲	│	╱			
─	☆	─	─	☖	─	─	☆	─
			╱	│	╲			
		╱		│		╲		

Heavenly horse (天馬)

- Jump: The heavenly horse jumps at an angle intermediate between orthogonal and diagonal, amounting to one square forward plus one square diagonally forward, in a single motion; or one square backward plus one square diagonally backward, in a single motion.
- It ignores intervening pieces while jumping to its destination, though its destination square must of course be either empty, or occupied by an opponent's piece (in which case the opponent's piece is captured), just as with any other moving piece.
- Range: It can move any number of free squares in a straight line orthogonally forward.
- Notation: vNfR

	│	
☆	│	☆
	│	
	☖	
☆		☆

Spirit turtle (霊亀)

- Jump: The spirit turtle can jump to the third square in the four orthogonal directions.
- Range: It can move as a queen.
- Notation: QH

╲				│				╱
	╲			☆			╱	
		╲		│		╱		
			╲	│	╱			
─	☆	─	─	☖	─	─	☆	─
			╱	│	╲			
		╱		│		╲		
	╱			☆			╲	
╱				│				╲

Treasure turtle (宝亀)

- Jump: The treasure turtle can jump to the second square in the four orthogonal directions.
- Range: It can move as a queen.
- Notation: QD

╲			│			╱
	╲		☆		╱	
		╲	│	╱		
─	☆	─	☖	─	☆	─
		╱	│	╲		
	╱		☆		╲	
╱			│			╲

Wooden dove (鳩槃)

- Limited range: The wooden dove can move one or two squares in the four orthogonal directions.
- Ranging: It can move any number of free squares in a straight line in the four diagonal directions.
- Jump plus limited range: It can jump to the third square in the four diagonal directions, and then (optionally) move one or two squares in the same direction.
- Notation: R2BG(G-B2)

╲												╱
	○										○	
		○								○		
			☆						☆			
				╲		○		╱				
					╲	○	╱					
				○	○	☖	○	○				
					╱	○	╲					
				╱		○		╲				
			☆						☆			
		○								○		
	○										○	
╱												╲

Center master (中師)

- Limited range: The center master can move one to three squares orthogonally sideways or diagonally backward.
- Ranging: It can move any number of free squares in a straight line orthogonally or diagonally forwards or orthogonally backwards.
- Jump: It can jump to the second square orthogonally forward or backward, or diagonally forward.
- Notation: sR3bB3vDfAvRfB

╲				│				╱
	╲			│			╱	
		☆		☆		☆		
			╲	│	╱			
	○	○	○	☖	○	○	○	
			○	│	○			
		○		☆		○		
	○			│			○	
				│				

Peng master (鵬師)

- Limited range: The peng master can move one to five squares orthogonally sideways or diagonally backward.
- Jump: It can jump to the third square in either forward diagonal direction.
- Ranging: It can move any number of free squares in a straight line forward or orthogonally backward.
- Notation: fGbB5fBsR5vR

╲						│						╱
	╲					│					╱	
		╲				│				╱		
			☆			│			☆			
				╲		│		╱				
					╲	│	╱					
	○	○	○	○	○	☖	○	○	○	○	○	
					○	│	○					
				○		│		○				
			○			│			○			
		○				│				○		
	○					│					○	
						│						

Free eagle (奔鷲)

- Ranging: The free eagle can move any number of free squares in a straight line in any orthogonal or diagonal direction.
- Jump/ranging: It can jump up to 3 steps in any orthogonal or diagonal direction (squares ① - ③), or up to 4 steps if diagonally forward (squares ① - ④), and then (optionally) continue moving any number of free squares in that direction.
- Multi capture/ranging: It can capture all pieces on squares ① - ③ (or if moving forward diagonally, ① - ④), and then (optionally) continue moving any number of free squares in that direction.
  - When it is performing a multi-capture move, it must capture all pieces on squares ① - ③ (or if moving forward diagonally, ① - ④). It cannot jump to ② or ③ then start a multi-capture, and it cannot stop before reaching a ③ square (or if moving forward diagonally, a ④ square).
- It does not have to jump before moving or move after jumping.
- It may move to an adjacent (a ① square) and return to its original square in the same move.
  - This means it may capture a piece on an adjacent square without moving (igui).
  - This also means it may move to an adjacent empty square and immediately return, effectively staying put and passing the player's turn (jitto).
- Notation: QDAHGf(4,4)(cK-bK)(D-R)(A-B)(H-R)(G-B)(f(4,4)-B)

╲					│					╱
	④☆				│				④☆	
		③☆			③☆			③☆		
			②☆		②☆		②☆			
				①!	①!	①!				
─	─	③☆	②☆	①!	☖	①!	②☆	③☆	─	─
				①!	①!	①!				
			②☆		②☆		②☆			
		③☆			③☆			③☆		
	╱				│				╲	
╱					│					╲

Free bird (奔翅)

- Limited range: The free bird can move one to three squares diagonally backward.
- Range: It can move any number of free squares in a straight line in the four orthogonal directions.
- Jump and range: It can jump up to three pieces diagonally forward, and then optionally continue any number of free squares in that direction.
- Notation: RbB3(f(mpB)3-B)

╲				│				╱
	╲			│			╱	
		╲		│		╱		
			3	│	3			
─	─	─	─	☖	─	─	─	─
			○	│	○			
		○		│		○		
	○			│			○	
				│				

Great hawk (大鷹)

- Range: The great hawk can move any number of squares in any direction, orthogonally or diagonally.
- Jump and range: It can jump to the second square orthogonally forward before (optionally) moving on in that direction.
- Notation: QfD(fD-R)

		│		
╲		☆		╱
	╲	│	╱	
─	─	☖	─	─
	╱	│	╲	
╱		│		╲
		│		

King of teachings (教王)

- Jump and range: The king of teachings can jump up to three pieces along a straight line in any diagonal or orthogonal direction, and then optionally continue any number of free squares in that direction.
- Notation: HG(H-R)(G-B)

╲				│				╱
	╲			│			╱	
		╲		│		╱		
			3	3	3			
─	─	─	3	☖	3	─	─	─
			3	3	3			
		╱		│		╲		
	╱			│			╲	
╱				│				╲

Mountain crane (山鶻)

- Range: The mountain crane can move as a queen.
- Jump and range: It can jump to the second, third or fourth square in any direction, then (optionally) continue moving in that direction.
- Notation: QDAHG(4,0)(4,4)(D-R)(A-B)(H-R)(G-B)((4,0)-R)((4,4)-B)

╲					│					╱
	☆				☆				☆	
		☆			☆			☆		
			☆		☆		☆			
				╲	│	╱				
─	☆	☆	☆	─	☖	─	☆	☆	☆	─
				╱	│	╲				
			☆		☆		☆			
		☆			☆			☆		
	☆				☆				☆	
╱					│					╲

Great eagle (大鷲)

- Range: The great eagle can move as a queen.
- Jump: It can jump to the second square in a forward diagonal direction, before (optionally) continue moving in that direction.
- Notation: Q(fA-B)

╲			│			╱
	☆		│		☆	
		╲	│	╱		
─	─	─	☖	─	─	─
		╱	│	╲		
	╱		│		╲	
╱			│			╲

Great elephant (大象)

- Limited range: The great elephant can move one to three squares diagonally forward.
- Jump and range: It can jump up to three pieces in a straight line diagonally backward or in one of the four orthogonal directions, and then optionally continue any number of free squares in that direction.
- Notation: fB3(pR-R)(b(mpB)3-B)

				│				
	○			│			○	
		○		│		○		
			○	3	○			
─	─	─	3	☖	3	─	─	─
			3	3	3			
		╱		│		╲		
	╱			│			╲	
╱				│				╲

Gold bird (金翅)

- Limited range: The gold bird can move one to three squares orthogonally sideways or diagonally backward.
- Range: It can move any number of free squares in a straight line orthogonally forward or backward.
- Jump and range: It can jump up to three pieces diagonally forward, and then optionally continue any number of free squares in that direction.
- Notation: bF3sW3vF(f(mpFF)3-FF)

╲				│				╱
	╲			│			╱	
		╲		│		╱		
			3	│	3			
	○	○	○	☖	○	○	○	
			○	│	○			
		○		│		○		
	○			│			○	
				│				

Ancient dragon (元龍)

- Range: The ancient dragon can move any number of free squares in a straight line in the four diagonal directions.
- Jump and range: It can jump over up to three squares pieces orthogonally forward or backward, before (optionally) continue moving in that direction.
- Notation: B(v(mppR3)-R)

╲		│		╱
	╲	3	╱	
		☖		
	╱	3	╲	
╱		│		╲

Rain demon (霖鬼)

- Limited range: The rain demon can move one or two squares orthogonally sideways or diagonally backward.
- Limited range: It can move one to three squares orthogonally forward.
- Range: It can move any number of free squares in a straight line orthogonally backward, or diagonally forward.
- Jump and range: It can jump to the second square along either forward diagonal, before (optionally) moving on in that direction.
- Notation: fR3sR2bB2bR(fmB-B)

╲			○			╱
	☆		○		☆	
		╲	○	╱		
	○	○	☖	○	○	
		○	│	○		
	○		│		○	
			│			
			│			

Flying general (飛将)

- Range capture: The flying general can fly over any number of squares along a straight line in any orthogonal direction, so long as they don't contain a royal (king or crown prince) or another range capturing piece. All pieces it flies over are removed from the game.
- Notation: ((cRcdR)-R), ignoring capturing restrictions

		│		
		│		
─	─	☖	─	─
		│		
		│		

Angle general (角将)

- Range capture: The angle general can fly over any number of squares along a straight line in any diagonal direction, so long as they don't contain a royal (king or crown prince) or another range capturing piece. All pieces it flies over are removed from the game.
- Notation: ((cBcdB)-B), ignoring capturing restrictions

╲				╱
	╲		╱	
		☖		
	╱		╲	
╱				╲

Great general (大将)

- Range capture: The great general can fly over any number of squares along a straight line in any direction, orthogonally or diagonally, as long as they don't contain a royal (king or crown prince) or another great general. All pieces it flies over are removed from the game.
- Notation: ((cQcdQ)-Q), ignoring capturing restrictions

╲		│		╱
	╲	│	╱	
─	─	☖	─	─
	╱	│	╲	
╱		│		╲

Fierce dragon (猛龍)

- Limited range: The fierce dragon can move one or two squares in the four orthogonal directions.
- Range capture: It can fly over any number of pieces along one of the four diagonal directions, as long as they don't include a royal (king or crown prince) or another range capturing piece. All pieces it flies over are removed from the game.
- Notation: W2((cBcdB)-B), ignoring capturing restrictions

╲						╱
	╲		○		╱	
		╲	○	╱		
	○	○	☖	○	○	
		╱	○	╲		
	╱		○		╲	
╱						╲

Flying crocodile (飛鰐)

- Limited range: The flying crocodile can move one or two squares diagonally backward.
- Limited range: It can move one to three squares diagonally forward.
- Range capture: It can jump any number of pieces in one of the four orthogonal directions, as long as these do not include a royal (king or crown prince) or another range capturing piece. Any piece it jumps over is removed from the board.
- Notation: bB2fB3((cRcdR)-R), ignoring capturing restrictions

				│				
	○			│			○	
		○		│		○		
			○	│	○			
─	─	─	─	☖	─	─	─	─
			○	│	○			
		○		│		○		
				│				
				│				

Vice general (副将)

- Jump: The vice general can jump to the second square in the four orthogonal directions. This is a standard jump.
- Range capture: It can fly over any number of squares along one of the four diagonal directions, as long as they don't contain a royal (king or crown prince), great general, or another vice general. All pieces it flies over are removed from the game.
- Notation: D((cBcdB)-B), ignoring capturing restrictions

╲						╱
	╲		☆		╱	
		╲		╱		
	☆		☖		☆	
		╱		╲		
	╱		☆		╲	
╱						╲

Hook mover (鉤行)

- Hook move: The hook mover can move any number of free squares in a straight line in the four orthogonal directions, then (optionally) turn 90° and move any number of free squares in a perpendicular direction.
- Notation: R(R-sR)

	─	┼	─	
│		┼		│
┼	┼	☖	┼	┼
│		┼		│
	─	┼	─	

Tengu (天狗)

- Hook move: The tengu can move any number of free squares in a straight line in the four diagonal directions, then (optionally) turn 90° and move any number of free squares in a perpendicular direction.
- Notation: B(B-sB)

Unlike in other shogi variants, in taikyoku the tengu cannot move orthogonally, and therefore can only reach half of the squares on the board. This is the move of the capricorn, and may be an error.

╳				╳
	╳		╳	
		☖		
	╳		╳	
╳				╳

Capricorn (摩羯)

- Hook move: The capricorn can move any number of free squares in a straight line in the four diagonal directions, then (optionally) turn 90° and move any number of free squares in a perpendicular direction.
- Notation: B(B-sB). If the capricorn can also move one square orthogonally, the notation can be represented as WB(B-sB)

The description of the Tengu implies the capricorn also can move one square orthogonally. If it isn't the case, it can only reach half of the squares on the board.

╳				╳
	╳		╳	
		☖		
	╳		╳	
╳				╳

╳				╳
	╳	○	╳	
	○	☖	○	
	╳	○	╳	
╳				╳

Peacock (孔雀)

- Hook move: The peacock can move any number of free squares in a straight line along one of the two forward diagonals, then (optionally) turn 90° and move any number of free squares in a straight line in a perpendicular diagonal direction.
- Limited range: It can move one or two squares in one of the two rearward diagonals.
- Notation: bB2fB(fB-sB)

╳		╱		╲		╳
	╳				╳	
╱		╳		╳		╲
	╱		☖		╲	
╱		○		○		╲
	○				○	

Heavenly tetrarch king (四天王)

- Range: The heavenly tetrarch king can move any number of free squares in a straight line in any direction, orthogonally or diagonally.
- Jump and range: It can jump to the second square in any direction before (optionally) moving on in that direction.
- Notation: QDA(D-R)(A-B)

╲			│			╱
	☆		☆		☆	
		╲	│	╱		
─	☆	─	☖	─	☆	─
		╱	│	╲		
	☆		☆		☆	
╱			│			╲

Lion (獅子)

- Area move/double capture: The lion can step one square in any direction up to twice in a turn. It can change directions after its first step, and is not restricted to following one of the eight orthogonal or diagonal directions. That is, it can also step to one of the in-between squares that a knight jumps to in Western chess.
  - Unlike the hook movers, it can continue after a capture on the first step, potentially capturing two pieces on each turn.
  - By moving back to its starting square, it can effectively capture a piece on an adjacent square without moving. This is called 居喰い igui "stationary feeding".
  - A similar move without capturing leaves the board unchanged, which is a way to pass a turn (jitto).
- Jump: The lion can jump anywhere within two squares. This is equivalent to jumping in any of the eight diagonal or orthogonal directions, or making any of the jumps of a knight in Western chess.
- Notation: KDAN(cK-bK)

Note: The restrictions when capturing a lion in chu shogi do not apply in taikyoku shogi.

○	○	○	○	○
○	○	○	○	○
○	○	☖	○	○
○	○	○	○	○
○	○	○	○	○

☆	☆	☆	☆	☆
☆	!	!	!	☆
☆	!	☖	!	☆
☆	!	!	!	☆
☆	☆	☆	☆	☆

Furious fiend (奮迅)

- Area move/double capture or jump: The furious fiend can move as a lion; or
- Limited range: It can move three squares in any direction, orthogonal or diagonal. (A normal move: it can only capture once and cannot jump when doing this.)
- Notation: Q3DAN(cK-bK)

○	○	○	○	○
○	○	○	○	○
○	○	☖	○	○
○	○	○	○	○
○	○	○	○	○

☆	☆	☆	☆	☆
☆	!	!	!	☆
☆	!	☖	!	☆
☆	!	!	!	☆
☆	☆	☆	☆	☆

○			○			○
	○		○		○	
		○	○	○		
○	○	○	☖	○	○	○
		○	○	○		
	○		○		○	
○			○			○

Buddhist spirit (法性)

- Area move/double capture: The Buddhist spirit can move as a lion, or
- Range: It can move as a queen.
- Notation: QDAN(cK-bK)

○	○	○	○	○
○	○	○	○	○
○	○	☖	○	○
○	○	○	○	○
○	○	○	○	○

☆	☆	☆	☆	☆
☆	!	!	!	☆
☆	!	☖	!	☆
☆	!	!	!	☆
☆	☆	☆	☆	☆

╲			│			╱
	╲		│		╱	
		╲	│	╱		
─	─	─	☖	─	─	─
		╱	│	╲		
	╱		│		╲	
╱			│			╲

Lion hawk (獅鷹)

- Area move/double capture/ranging: The lion hawk can move as a lion or as a bishop.
- Jump/ranging: It can leap to the second square in any diagonal direction.
- Notation: WBDAN(cK-bK)

○	○	○	○	○
○	○	○	○	○
○	○	☖	○	○
○	○	○	○	○
○	○	○	○	○

☆	☆	☆	☆	☆
☆	!	!	!	☆
☆	!	☖	!	☆
☆	!	!	!	☆
☆	☆	☆	☆	☆

╲						╱
	☆				☆	
		╲		╱		
			☖			
		╱		╲		
	☆				☆	
╱						╲

== See also ==
- Chu shogi
- Dai dai shogi
- Dai shogi
- Heian dai shogi
- Maka dai dai shogi
- Shogi variant
- Tai shogi
- Tenjiku shogi
- Wa shogi
