= Dilong =

Chinese dragon name

Dilong (traditional Chinese: 地龍; simplified Chinese: 地龙; pinyin: dìlóng; Wade–Giles: ti-lung; lit. "earth dragon") is a Chinese dragon name that is also used to mean "earthworm" in traditional Chinese medicine and Geosaurus in zoological nomenclature.

== Dragon ==
In Chinese mythology, dilong (地龍; "earth dragon") is one of many types of -long (龍) dragons such as shenlong (神龍; "divine dragon") and huanglong (黃龍; "Yellow Dragon"). Since dì (地; "earth; land; soil; ground") semantically contrasts with tian (天; "heaven; sky") (e.g., 天地; tiandi; "heaven and earth; universe", see Tiandihui), the dilong is paired with the tianlong (天龍; "heavenly dragon"). Chinese dragons were supposedly able to fly, and thus were considered celestial creatures rather than terrestrial ones like the "earthbound" dilong. Two other exceptions are panlong (蟠龍; "coiled/curled dragon; a dragon that has not ascended to heaven") and tulong (土龍; "soil/earth dragon"), which refers to the tuo (鼉; "Chinese Alligator") (cf. Japanese mogura 土竜 "mole").

Dilong first occurs in the mid-7th century CE History of the Southern Dynasties biography of Liang dynasty Admiral Wang Sengbian 王僧辯 (d. 555 CE). It says witnesses saw lianglong (兩龍; "two/paired dragons") that ascended into the sky, and this dilong "earth dragon" leaving Liang territory was interpreted as a portent of their defeat in 550 CE. Ronan and Needham cite another context in Wang's biography that says his boat had shuanglong (雙龍; "two dragons") on the side, which they construe as a "literary emendation" for shuanglun (雙輪; "two wheels") describing an early paddleboat.

== Earthworm ==
Dilong or dilongzi (地龍子; "earth dragon child") is an elegant name for the "earthworm; worm", which is usually called qiuyin (蚯蚓). "Long 龍 is employed in Chinese zoological nomenclature in much the same way that English dragon is used in dragonfly or dragonfish". First, "long names lifeforms thought to resemble dragons" (e.g., 海龍; hailong; 'sea dragon'; "sea otter; pipefish"; or 龍落子; longluozi; 'dragon fall child'; "seahorse"); second, "long 龍 is closely associated with dinosaurs" (e.g., oracle bones were originally called longgu (龍骨; "dragon/dinosaur bones")).

Dilong first means "earthworm" in the Qixiu Leigao (七修類稿) written by the Ming dynasty scholar Lang Ying 郎瑛 (1487–1566 CE). The 1578 Bencao Gangmu pharmacological entry for qiuyin (蚯蚓; "earthworm") lists alternate names of dilong and tulong (土龍) (see above). Li Shizhen notes these names derive from the myth that earthworms (like dragons) can create yinqing (陰晴; "cloudy and clear; unsettled weather").

Dilongsan (地龍散; "earth dragon powder"), or Di Long, is used in traditional Chinese medicine. It is prepared from the abdomen of the Red earthworm, Lumbricus rubellus, and has many purported medicinal uses.

== Other meanings ==
Dilong (地龍; "earth dragon") is the modern Chinese term for the Mesozoic crocodilian Geosaurus (from Greek "earth lizard"). Contrast the feathered tyrannosaurid Dilong paradoxus that was named from Chinese dilong (帝龍; "emperor dragon").

Chinese dilong or Japanese chiryū 地龍 is the name of a chess piece in shogi. In Taikyoku shogi, this piece has 地龍; "earth dragon" written on one side and yulong or uryū 雨龍 "rain dragon" on the obverse.

One variety of Ditangquan martial arts is called Shaolin dilongquan (少林地龙拳; "Shaolin Earth Dragon Boxing").

In the sexagenary cycle and Chinese astrology, duchen (土辰; "The Year of the Earth Dragon") is a recurring combination of Dragon with the Five Elements/Phases, see Chinese calendar correspondence table and Tibetan calendar.
