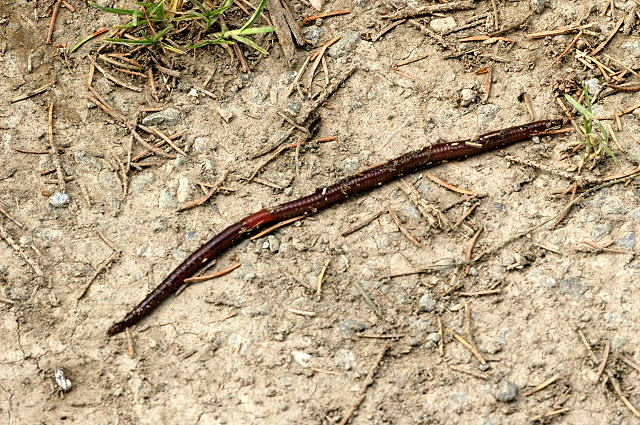

Scientific classification
- Kingdom: Animalia
- Phylum: Annelida
- Clade: Pleistoannelida
- Clade: Sedentaria
- Class: Clitellata
- Order: Opisthopora
- Family: Lumbricidae
- Genus: Lumbricus
- Species: L. rubellus

Binomial name
- Lumbricus rubellus Hoffmeister, 1843

= Lumbricus rubellus =

Red earthworm

Species of annelid worm

Lumbricus rubellus is a species of earthworm that is related to Lumbricus terrestris. It is usually reddish brown or reddish violet, iridescent dorsally, and pale yellow ventrally. They are usually about 25 millimetres (0.98 in) to 105 millimetres (4.1 in) in length, with around 95–120 segments. Their native distribution was mainland Europe and the British Isles, but they have currently spread worldwide in suitable habitats.

== Size and appearance ==
Lumbricus rubellus, or the "red earthworm", ranges from 25 millimetres (0.98 in) to 105 millimetres (4.1 in) in length and has smooth, reddish, semi-transparent, flexible skin segmented into circular sections. Each segment contains four pairs of setae, or bristles, and the total number of segments per matured organism ranges from 95–105. The segmentation of Lumbricus rubellus identifies the organism as a member of Phylum Annelida, while the enlarged segments towards the anterior of the organism called the clitellum denotes membership to Class Clitellata. Members of this class are also defined by having permanent gonads.

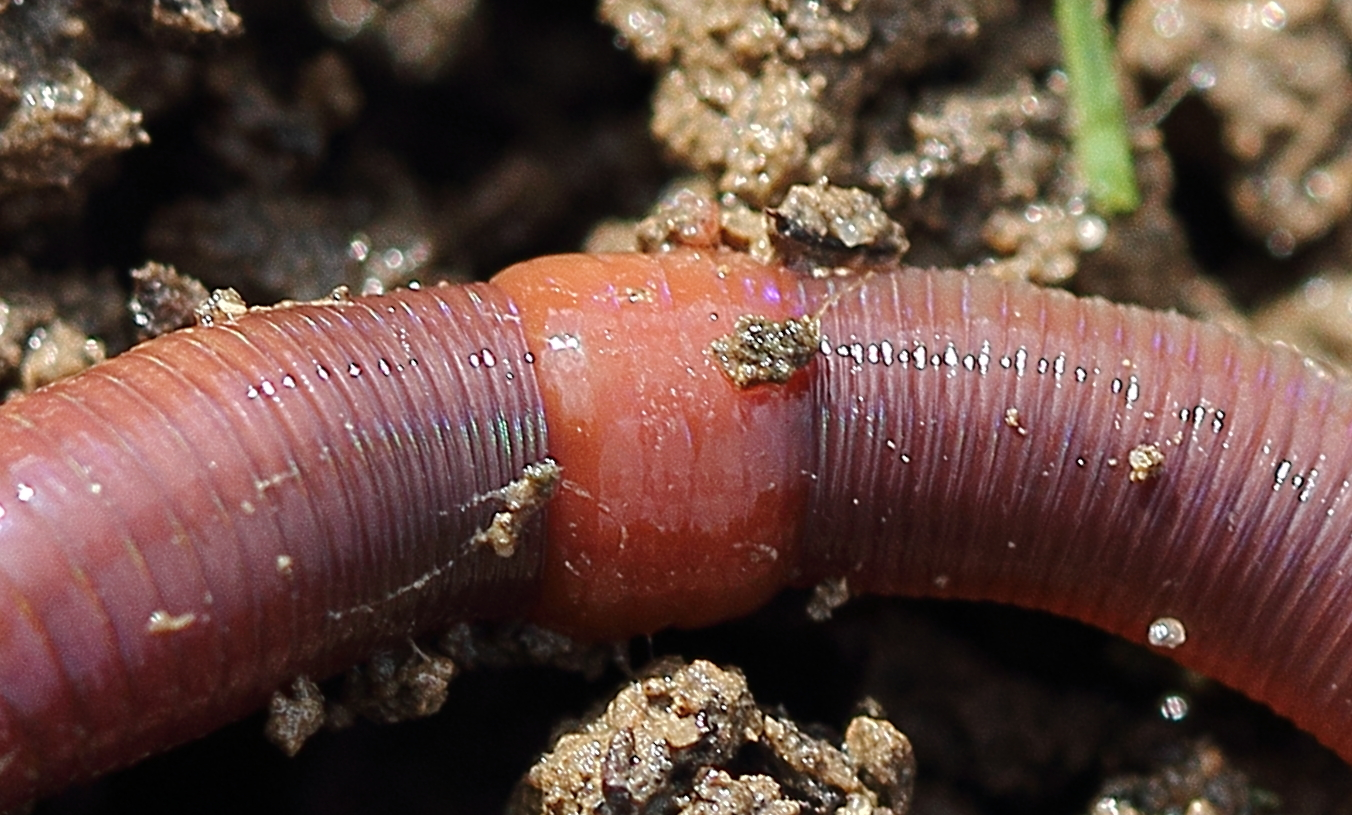
The clitellum of L. rubellus reaches from segments 26 to 32

== Habitat ==
Lumbricus rubellus naturally lives in soils high in organic matter, preferably dung and feces. The worms require loose soil to burrow in and soil moist enough for gas exchange. Further requirements include such abiotic factors as pH and temperature.

Various abiotic factors are significant to Lumbricus rubellus. pH is of particular importance; a range of 5.5 to 8.7 is acceptable with a preference for neutral soils. Temperature is also significant, with implications for growth, respiration, metabolism and reproduction amongst other things. An ideal temperature is 51 degrees Fahrenheit (10.6 degrees Celsius). A further abiotic factor is moisture, which is important for respiration. A similar species, Millsonia anomala, was most active at 10–17% moisture content. The substratum for Lumbricus rubellus is related to the species food sources and pH and moisture requirements. Dung is the species preference. With regards to light intensity, most earthworm species are photonegative to strong sources of light and photopositive to weak sources of light. This is attributable to the effects of intense light, such as drying and a lack of food sources found above ground for earthworms.

== Behaviour ==
The sense organs of Lumbricus rubellus associated with feeding are on the prostomium, located at the anterior end of the organism. The chemoreceptors here are sensitive to alkaloids, polyphenols, and acids. Negative responses are caused by acid and alkaloids (at certain levels), while polyphenol sensitivity identifies different food sources. Chemoreceptors can also be found on other parts of the organism's body. These serve to direct the organism away from dangers such as temperature or pH variations, and to direct the organism towards possible food sources.

== Role in ecosystems ==
Lumbricus rubellus is a saprophage which feeds on organic material that is in a high state of decomposition. In ecosystems, earthworms such as Lumbricus rubellus increase the rate of transfer between trophic levels by making it easier for plants to uptake nutrients. In food chains, earthworms such as Lumbricus rubellus are primary consumers whose role is converting the energy synthesized by photosynthetic plants into food for animals at higher trophic levels.

One significant biotic interaction of Lumbricus rubellus results from a relationship with vitamin B_{12}-producing microorganisms such as bacteria and actinomycetes and barley. The presence of such earthworms as Lumbricus rubellus increases concentrations of vitamin B_{12}-producing microorganisms and vitamin B_{12} in the soil. The result is an increased barley yield and an increased volume of organic material for the earthworms. In this way a positive feedback relationship exists between the barley, microorganisms and Lumbricus rubellus.

== Medicinal uses ==
In traditional Chinese medicine, abdominal extracts from Lumbricus rubellus are used in a preparation known as Di Long, or Earth Dragon, for treatment of rheumatic, phlegm and blood disorders.
