= Di Long (extract) =

Di Long or Dilong extract (Chinese: 地龍散; pinyin: dìlóngsàn; Wade–Giles: ti-lung san; lit. 'earth-dragon/-worm powder') is a medicinal preparation based on abdominal extracts from the earthworm species Lumbricus rubellus used in traditional Chinese medicine (TCM) for a wide variety of disorders, from convulsions and fevers to rheumatoid arthritis and blood stasis syndromes.

== Synopsis ==
Di Long comes in two variants, Guang Di Long native to Guangdong, Guangxi, Fujian and collected from spring to autumn, and Tu Di Long collected during the summer in many regions of China. The abdomen of an earthworm of the L. rubellus species is cut open immediately after capture, whereupon viscera and extraneous matter are removed. The abdomen is washed clean, and dried in the sun or indoors at a low temperatures.

It is also used in the treatment of blepharoptosis, or drooping of the upper eyelid, along with other Phlegm Herbs (such as Dan Nan Xing, Jiang Can, Ban Xia, Tian Ma and Bai Fu Zi).

According to TCM, Di Long is associated with the Bladder, Liver, Lung and Spleen meridians, and has Salty and Cold properties. It is thought to work by draining Liver Heat and by clearing Lung Heat, and also by clearing Heat in the collateral channels. Its "channel-opening" properties are thought to derive from its habits of burrowing through the earth, constantly searching out new spaces to slither.

Recommended dosage is 4.5 to 12 grams per day as an oral preparation.
