= Godai (Japanese philosophy) =

Five elements in Japanese philosophy

Godai (五大; lit. "five – great, large, physical, form") are the five elements in Japanese Buddhist thought: earth (chi), water (sui), fire (ka), wind (fu), and void (ku). Its origins are from the Indian Buddhist concept of Mahābhūta, disseminated and influenced by Chinese traditions before being absorbed, influenced, and refined into and by Japanese tradition, culture, and indigenous folk religions.

The Japanese Buddhist concept of gogyo, which stems from Chinese Taoist wuxing, is distinguishable from godai by the fact that the functional phases of wood and metal within gogyo are replaced by the formative elements of void and wind (air) in godai, similar to the classical Greek philosophical elements. Godai attributed to esoteric Japanese Buddhism during the eleventh century CE in relation to the idea of gorin (the "five wheels" or the "five rings"). Godai and gorin are also seen within the practice of ninjutsu, where these principles became an essential aspect of the esoteric ninja teachings (the ninpo-mikkyo), whereas the theory of gogyo moved into the functional theory of traditional Japanese medicine and exoteric Buddhism.

== The elements ==
The godai is a static or inert philosophical understanding of the traditional Japanese elements and study. The four main elements or building blocks are earth, water, fire, and wind, while void is non-substantial.

[ mikkyo ] teaches that all physical aspects of existence originate from a common source and can be classified in one of the godai five elemental manifestations of physical matter. Chi, or the earth, symbolizes solid matter. Sui, the water, symbolizes liquids. Ka, the fire, is the symbol of combustion, or the elements in an energy-releasing state. Fu, the wind, symbolizes gases. Ku, the void, is representative of the formless subatomic energy that is the basis for the structure of all things. This godai symbolism is also used to describe the emotional nature of human beings, and to provide a symbolic structure for the teaching of effective physical combat principles in ninjutsu.

— Stephen K. Hayes

As such, these may describe an individual's response to direct confrontation, such as in martial arts associations with physical center, footwork.

1. Chi: stability/stubbornness; holding ground and using strength and presence (source: strength)
2. Sui: flexibility/emotionalism; defensive angling and footwork to overextend the attacker before counterattacking (source: power)
3. Ka: Using high energy attacks defensively (source: energy)
4. Fu: Evasive, elusive methods that redirect attacks away from their targets (source: resiliency)
5. Ku: Spontaneous and inventive fighting

=== Earth ===
Earth

地 Chi (sometimes ji) or tsuchi, meaning "Earth", represents the hard, solid objects of Earth. The most basic example of chi is in a stone. Stones are highly resistant to movement or change, as is anything heavily influenced by chi. In people, the bones, muscles and tissues are represented by chi. Emotionally, chi is predominantly associated with collectiveness, stability, physicality, and gravity. It is a desire to have things remain as they are, a resistance to change. In the mind, it is confidence when under the influence of this chi mode or "mood", we are aware of our own physicality and sureness of action. This is a separate concept from the energy-force, pronounced in Chinese as qì (also written ch'i) and in Japanese as ki, and written alternatively as 気, 氣, or 气.

=== Water ===
Water

水 Sui or mizu, meaning "Water", represents the fluid, flowing, and the formless things in the world. Outside of the obvious example of natural bodies of water, plants are also categorized under sui, as they adapt to their environment, growing and changing according to the direction of the sun and the changing seasons. Blood and other bodily fluids are represented by sui, as are mental or emotional tendencies towards adaptation and change. Sui can be associated with thought, defensiveness, adaptability, flexibility, suppleness, and magnetism.

=== Fire ===
Fire

火 Ka or hi, meaning "Fire", represents the energetic, forceful, moving things in the world. Animals, capable of movement and full of forceful energy, are primary examples of ka objects. Bodily, ka represents our metabolism and body heat, and in the mental and emotional realms, it represents drive and passion. Ka can be associated with security, motivation, desire, intention, and an outgoing spirit.

=== Wind ===
Wind

風 Fū or kaze, meaning "Wind", represents things that grow, expand, and enjoy freedom of movement. Aside from air, smoke and the like, fū can in some ways be best represented by the human mind. As we grow physically, we learn and expand mentally as well, in terms of our knowledge, our experiences, and our personalities. Fū represents breathing, and the internal processes associated with respiration. Mentally and emotionally, it represents an "open-minded" attitude and carefree feeling. It can be associated with will, elusiveness, and evasiveness.

=== Void (Aether) ===
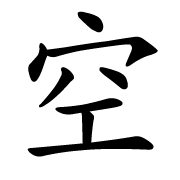
Void (Aether)

空 Kū or sora, most often translated as "void", but also meaning "sky", "heaven" or environment, represents those things beyond and within our everyday comprehension, particularly those things composed of pure energy before they manifest; the emptiness that the energy is made up of. Bodily, kū represents spirit, thought and creative energy. It represents the creation of phenomena. It can also be associated with the potential of power, creativity, spontaneity and inventiveness.

Kū is of particular importance as the highest of the elements. In martial arts, particularly in fictional tales where the fighting discipline is blended with magic or the occult, one often invokes the power of the void to connect to the quintessential creative energy of the world. A warrior properly attuned to the void can sense their surroundings and act without using the mind, and without using their "physical senses".

== Representations of the godai ==
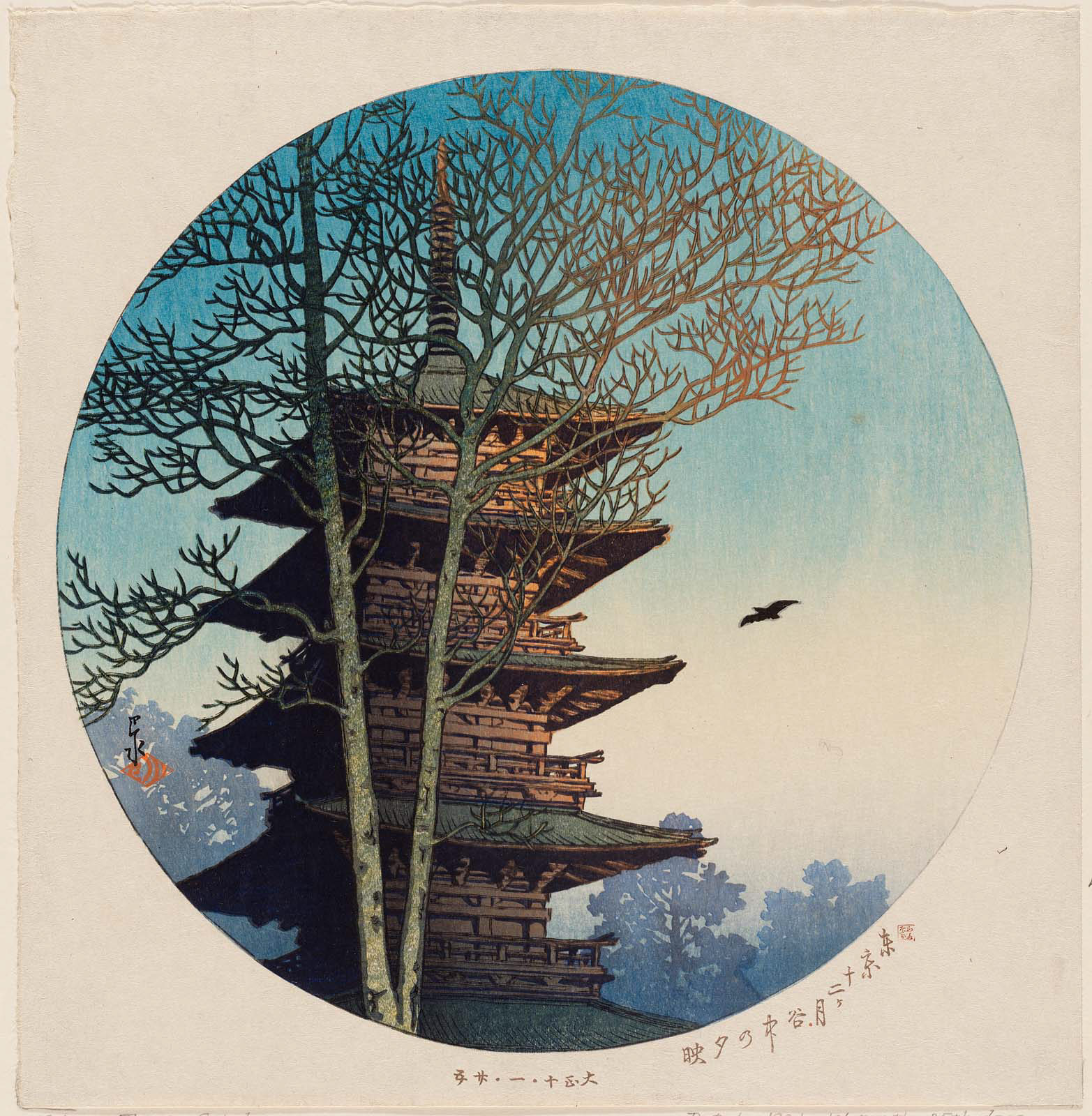
Kawase Hasui's "Evening Glow at Yanaka" (1921) showing the five roofs of a pagoda

The most common representations today of the five elements, outside of martial arts and fictional references, are found in Buddhist architecture.

Many temples in Japan have beautiful goju-no-to, or five storied towers [pagodas]. Five roofs of graceful curves make the towers architectural beauties...of wooden construction built without any nails or bolts. ...Though they are beautiful, they are not erected merely as architectural ornaments for temples. The five stories stand for...godai, or Five Greats in Buddhism. They are the elements in the Universe from which are produced all things. ...Thus the towers symbolize the Universe and everything existing in it.

A diagram of a gorintō, colored and labeled with the kanji for the godai elements corresponding to each ring

Japanese gorintō (五輪塔) (from 五 'five', 輪 'ring shape', and 塔 'tower') can be seen in Zen gardens and Buddhist temples, represented as stupas. They have five divisions to represent the five elements, although the five segments can be hard to discern. Touching the ground, the bottom-most piece represents chi; the next section represents sui; ka is represented by the middle section, while fū and kū are represented by the top-most two sections, pointing towards the sky. A gorintō is composed, from bottom to top, of a cube, a sphere, a pyramid, a crescent, and a shape resembling a lotus flower. These shapes also relate to the meanings described above.

The stone lanterns or tōrō (灯籠), which are similar in form to the gorintō, are stone towers of modest size put on a center line for the approach mainly to the Buddhist temples and cemeteries. The function of the toro is different from the gorintō: they are intended to illuminate the approach to the temple like lighthouses, with a flame encased in the section representing ka, for Buddhist ceremonies taking place at night.

== See also ==
- Chinese Buddhist canon
- Classical element
- Feng shui
- Gogyo
- Onmyōdō
- Pancha Bhoota
- Wuxing (Chinese philosophy)
