= List of presidents of Wellesley College =

The following list of people have served as president of Wellesley College, a private women's liberal arts college located in Wellesley, Massachusetts. The current president is Paula A. Johnson. Over the past 140 years of Wellesley College's operation, there have been fourteen presidents. All of the previous presidents have been women.

List of presidents of Wellesley College
No.	Image	President	Term start	Term end	Ref.
1		Ada Howard	1875	1881	
2		Alice Freeman Palmer	1881	1887	
3		Helen Shafer	1887	1894	
4		Julia Irvine	1894	1899	
5		Caroline Hazard	1899	1910	
6		Ellen Fitz Pendleton	1911	1936	
7		Mildred McAfee Horton	1936	1949	
8		Margaret Clapp	1949	1966	
9		Ruth Adams	1966	1972	
10		Barbara W. Newell (Note: Newell took a leave of absence in July 1979 to serve as U.S. Ambassador to UNESCO.)	September 1, 1972	December 31, 1980	
acting		Carol Johnson Johns (Note: Johns, alumnae and member of the board of trustees, was on a leave of absence from Johns Hopkins School of Medicine to serve as acting president while President Newell served as U.S. Ambassador to UNESCO.)	July 1979	December 31, 1980	
acting		Maud Chaplin (Note: Dean of the College)	January 1, 1981	June 30, 1981	
11		Nannerl Overholser Keohane	July 1, 1981	June 30, 1993 (Note: Resigned to lead Duke University.)	
12		Diana Chapman Walsh	October 1, 1993	June 30, 2007	
acting		Andrew Shennan (Note: Dean of the college)	July 1, 2007	July 30, 2007	
13		H. Kim Bottomly	August 1, 2007	June 30, 2016	
14		Paula A. Johnson	July 1, 2016	current	

Table notes:

== About the Presidents ==
=== Paula A. Johnson, inaugurated 2016 ===
Paula A. Johnson is the fourteenth president of Wellesley and the first Black president of Wellesley College. Since July 2016, her efforts have gone into the college's mission to educate the world, create new opportunities, challenge assumptions, and embrace differences. As a cardiologist, researcher, and expert in public health and health policy, President Johnson has devoted her career to transforming the health and well-being of the communities. She was also the founding executive director of the Connors Center for Women’s Health and Gender Biology, chief of the Division of Women’s Health at Brigham and Women’s Hospital, professor of medicine at Harvard Medical School, and professor of epidemiology at the Harvard T.H. Chan School of Public Health. Her research has focused on understanding the difference in how disease is expressed for different genders and its implications on health policy.

=== H. Kim Bottomly, inaugurated 2007 ===
H. Kim Bottomly is the thirteenth president of Wellesley College, and she was the first scientist to be the president of the college. During her time at Wellesley, she restructured the college's finances after the 2008 recession, and the Madeleine Korbel Albright Institute for Global Affairs was created. Under her leadership, she began collaborative efforts with Olin College and Babson College. Other efforts she pushed for were to renovate and maintain the upkeep of the historic buildings on campus.

=== Diana Chapman Walsh '66, 1993-2007 ===
Diana Chapman Walsh was the 12th president of Wellesley and the fourth alumna to head the college. An English major at Wellesley, she went on to earn a master’s degree in Journalism and a Ph.D. in health policy from Boston University, where she subsequently served on the faculty. Named a Kellogg National Fellow in 1987, Walsh traveled throughout the United States and abroad studying workplace democracy and principles of leadership, as well as writing poetry. Immediately before returning to Wellesley in 1993, she was the Florence Sprague Norman and Laura Smart Norman Professor at the Harvard School of Public Health, where she chaired the Department of Health and Social Behavior.
