= Stacie E. Goddard =

American political scientist and professor

- Occupations: Arnold A. Saltzman Professor of War and Peace Studies, Columbia University; Director, Arnold A. Saltzman Institute of War and Peace Studies
- Spouse: Paul MacDonald

Academic background
- Education: University of Chicago (BA); Columbia University (PhD)

Academic work
- Discipline: International Relations
- Institutions: Columbia University; Wellesley College
- Main interests: International Security; Power Politics; Legitimacy; Territorial Conflict; Constructivism (international relations)
- Website: www.sipa.columbia.edu/communities-connections/faculty/stacie-goddard

Stacie E. Goddard is an American political scientist and the Arnold A. Saltzman Professor of War and Peace Studies at Columbia University, where she serves as director of the Arnold A. Saltzman Institute of War and Peace Studies. She previously taught at Wellesley College, where she served as the Betty Freyhof Johnson '44 Professor of Political Science and associate provost for Wellesley in the World. Goddard is known for her research on international order, grand strategy, and global power politics. She formerly served as the faculty director of the Madeleine Korbel Albright Institute for Global Affairs and is a non-resident fellow of the Quincy Institute.

== Biography ==
Goddard earned a B.A. in Political Science from University of Chicago in 1996 and a Ph.D. from Columbia University in 2003. Her Ph.D. thesis was "Uncommon ground: the making of indivisible issues".

She joined Wellesley College as an assistant professor in 2005 and later became the Betty Freyhof Johnson '44 Professor of Political Science and associate provost for Wellesley in the World. She was awarded Wellesley College's highest teaching award, the Anna and Samuel Pinanski Teaching Prize, in 2011.

In 2026, Goddard joined Columbia University as the Arnold A. Saltzman Professor of War and Peace Studies and director of the Arnold A. Saltzman Institute of War and Peace Studies.

== Academic work ==
Her first book, Indivisible Territory and the Politics of Legitimacy: Jerusalem and Northern Ireland, argues that the legitimacy of Israeli historical narratives is used as a tool to secure territory.

Her most recent book, When Right Makes Might: Rising Powers and the Challenge to World Order challenges conventional international relations realist theories and argues that "great powers divine the intentions of their adversaries through rising powers’ legitimation strategies."

She has published essays and op-eds in various media outlets on topics related to U.S. foreign policy, including Foreign Policy, The New York Times, The Washington Post. Her articles have widely appeared in International Security, International Studies Quarterly, International Organization, International Theory, and Security Studies.

Goddard has held fellowships at the Security Studies Program at MIT, Harvard Kennedy School Belfer Center for Science and International Affairs. In 2019, she was a visiting fellow at LMU Munich.

== Personal life ==
Goddard is married to political scientist Paul MacDonald.

== Publications ==
- When Right Makes Might: Rising Powers and the Challenge to World Order. Cornell University Press, 2018 ISBN 9781501730306
- Rhetoric and Grand Strategy. Edited with Ronald R. Krebs. special issue of Security Studies. 24 (1) (Spring 2015).
- Indivisible Territory and the Politics of Legitimacy: Jerusalem and Northern Ireland. New York: Cambridge University Press, 2010 ISBN 9780511635533
