= Paul K. MacDonald =

American political scientist and professor

- Occupations: Professor of Political Science, Wellesley College
- Spouse: Stacie Goddard

Academic background
- Education: University of California, Berkeley (BA); Columbia University (PhD)

Academic work
- Discipline: International Relations
- Main interests: International Security; Power Politics; Imperialism; U.S. Foreign Policy
- Website: sites.google.com/a/wellesley.edu/paul-k-macdonald/about

Paul K. MacDonald is an American political scientist and a professor of political science at Wellesley College. He is known for his research on global power politics, U.S. foreign policy, and the political and military dimensions of overseas expansion.

His work has been widely published in the American Political Science Review, International Organization, International Security, Security Studies, The Washington Quarterly, Review of International Studies, The Washington Post, and Foreign Affairs. He is also a faculty member of the Madeleine Korbel Albright Institute for Global Affairs, and an affiliate at the Stanford University's Center for International Security and Cooperation.

In the Foreign Affairs review of MacDonald's book Networks of Domination: The Social Foundations of Peripheral Conquest in International Politics, G. John Ikenberry comments: "The book is a sober reminder that great military power and dreams of empire cannot guarantee control of even a small foreign country -- much less world domination." Jack Snyder similarly noted that MacDonald's research helps "sharpen the insights of those who think about grand strategy and those who study how social network patterns shape our world."

His most recent book, Twilight of the Titans: Great Power Decline and Retrenchment, challenges conventional international relations theories regarding great power transitions.

== Education and career ==
MacDonald earned his B.A. in political science at the University of California, Berkeley in 1998 and his Ph.D. at Columbia University in 2007. He became an assistant professor at Williams College in 2008, and joined Wellesley College in 2011. He was awarded Wellesley College's highest teaching award, the Anna and Samuel Pinanski Teaching Prize, in 2018.

MacDonald has held research positions at the American Academy of Arts and Sciences, the Belfer Center for Science and International Affairs at the Harvard Kennedy School of Government, the Olin Institute for Strategic Studies at Harvard University, and the Center for International Security and Cooperation at Stanford University. In 2019, he was a visiting fellow at LMU Munich.

MacDonald is married to Wellesley political science professor Stacie Goddard.

== Publications ==
=== Books ===
- Twilight of the Titans: Great Power Decline and Retrenchment. Ithaca, NY: Cornell University Press, 2018.
- Networks of Domination: The Social Foundations of Peripheral Conquest in International Politics. New York: Oxford University Press, 2014

=== Selected Journal Articles and Chapters ===
- "The Governor's Dilemma in Overseas Empires," in The Governor's Dilemma: Indirect Governance Beyond Principles and Agents, Kenneth Abbot, Bernhard Zangl, Duncan Snidal, and Philipp Genschel, eds. (New York: Oxford University Press, 2020).
- "Embedded Authority: A Relational Network Approach to Hierarchy in World Politics," Review of International Studies, vol. 44, no. 1 (January 2018).
- "'Retribution Must Succeed Rebellion': The Colonial Origins of Counterinsurgency Failure," International Organization, vol. 67, no. 2 (April 2013)
- Paul K. MacDonald, Joseph M. Parent; Graceful Decline? The Surprising Success of Great Power Retrenchment. International Security 2011; 35 (4): 7–44. doi: https://doi.org/10.1162/ISEC_a_00034
- "Useful Fiction or Miracle Maker: the Competing Epistemological Foundations of Rational Choice Theory," American Political Science Review, vol. 97, no. 4 (November 2003).
