= Jonathan B. Knudsen =

American historian

Jonathan B. Knudsen (December 16, 1944 - August 28, 1999) was an American historian who specialized in 18th-century German history, a translator from German to English, and a professor of history at Wellesley College. He did his graduate work at the University of California, Berkeley and was the last advisee of Hans Rosenberg (who retired from Berkeley in 1972). His other graduate advisors were Gerald Feldman and Wolfgang Sauer (de).

== Life ==
Knudsen was from a working-class family and grew up in inner-city Detroit. In addition to studying at Berkeley, he spent many summers in Germany at the Max Planck Institute for History in Göttingen to conduct primary research. American mathematician Ted Hill met Knudsen in Germany in the '70s and has written about their encounter and friendship is his memoir, Pushing Limits.

== Academic Work ==
Knudsen has written the first and only monograph in English about the life and work of German social theorist Justus Möser. He also translated from German to English the book "Germany in the Age of Absolutism", by German historian Rudolf Vierhaus (de).

Knudsen published research articles on Friedrich Meinecke and Christoph Friedrich Nicolai.

He served for many years in the editorial board for the Central European History journal, in which he published book reviews and translations.

== Career at Wellesley College ==
Knudsen joined the History Department of Wellesley College in 1976 and served as its chair from 1992 to 1996. He taught a variety of courses in European cultural history, modern German history, the philosophy of history, and the sociology of knowledge. In 1982, he received the inaugural Pinanski Prize for Excellence in Teaching.
