= Barbara W. Newell =

American academic administrator (born 1929)

Dr. Barbara Newell
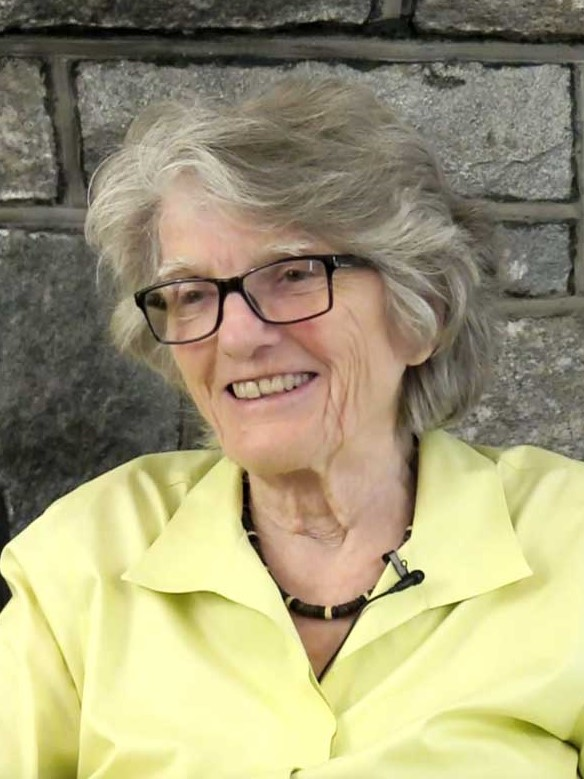
- Newell in 2018
- Born: August 19, 1929 (age 97); Pittsburgh, Pennsylvania, U.S.
- Education: University of Wisconsin; Vassar College
- Occupations: Academic administrator Former chancellor
- Spouse: Ernest Kolowrat
- Children: Elizabeth Penfield Newell

Barbara Warne Newell (born August 19, 1929) is an economist, career professor, and higher education administrator. She served as the tenth President of Wellesley College from 1972 to 1980 and was the first female chancellor of the State University System of Florida from 1981 to 1985.

During her time as the 10th President of Wellesley College, she founded the Center for Research on Women, which would later become the Wellesley Centers for Women. This institute is home to hundreds of research and action projects that have informed public policy, influenced practices, and shaped public opinion.

Newell also served as the first woman U.S. Ambassador to UNESCO from 1979 to 1981, succeeding Esteban Edward Torres.

== Early life ==
Barbara Newell (née Warne) was born on August 19, 1929, the daughter of Colston Warne and Frances Warne. She moved to Amherst, Massachusetts as an infant with her family, where her father taught economics at Amherst College from 1930 to 1969.

“My home was a social center for the Economics Departments of Smith and Mount Holyoke, as well as Amherst. So my childhood was peopled by a great number of professional women and I just took it for granted that this is where I was headed. I also noted that the only women economists in the country were employed by women’s colleges.” — Barbara Newell, Oral History Interview with Barbara Newell (WCW)

== Education ==
Newell attended Vassar College, noting that the historically women's college experience mirrored her childhood experiences with female role models. Newell graduated in 1951 with an A.B. in Economics.

After graduation, Newell was accepted to Yale's graduate program in labor economics, but was discriminated against on the basis of her gender, as she would be prohibited from teaching and completing fieldwork on the side. Newell ultimately attended the University of Wisconsin, which welcomed her with no such restrictions. Two years into the program, Newell lost her husband of five weeks, George V. Thompson, to polio. She took time off from her degree before her father encouraged her to return. H. Edwin Young, then chair of the economics department, and Robben Wright Fleming arranged for the University of Illinois to pay for Newell to complete her dissertation before coming back to the University of Wisconsin. She wrote her dissertation on Chicago and the labor movement. Newell received her M.A. In 1953 and Ph.D. in 1958, both in Economics.

During a time of national focus on poverty, Newell was inspired by Fleming to aid in the development of a Poverty Center in cooperation with Melvin Laird, a Republican Congressman from Wisconsin. The Poverty Center proposal was an early inspiration for the creation of the Wellesley Centers for Women (WCW).

Newell also received honorary degrees from the following thirteen institutions: Central Michigan University (1973), Trinity College (1973), Williams College (1974), Northeastern University (1974), Mt. Vernon College (1975), Purdue University (1976), Lesley College (1978), Denison University (1978), Rollins College (1981), Florida Institute of Technology (1981), Eckerd College (1982), Gettysburg College (1982), Butler University (1983), Alaska Pacific University (1986), Monmouth College (1986), and University of Maryland (1987).

== Career ==
After earning her doctorate from the University of Wisconsin in 1958, Newell was hired as Assistant Professor of Economics at Purdue University in 1959, making her the first woman hired by the Purdue School of Business. She applied for the position at Purdue University after her husband, physicist George Newell, was hired by the university. George Newell developed cancer in 1963 and died weeks later, leaving Barbara a single mother with a young daughter and an Assistant Professorship. Newell gained tenure at Purdue University in 1963, but returned to the University of Wisconsin Madison soon after to serve as Assistant to Chancellor Robben Fleming. In this role, Newell was tasked with creating a Center for Poverty at the university, an experience which would later be influential in her creation of the Wellesley Centers for Women during her presidency at Wellesley College.

After serving as an Associate Provost for Graduate Studies and Research at the University of Pittsburgh, Newell was appointed as the 10th President of Wellesley College in 1971 and served in the position until 1980. Newell was inaugurated into the presidency on Thursday, October 26 at Alumnae Hall of Wellesley College. Near the end of her presidency from 1979 to 1981, Newell became the first woman to serve as U.S. Ambassador to the United Nations Education, Scientific, and Cultural Organization (UNESCO). After leaving Wellesley College, she served as the chancellor of the State University System of Florida (1981–85) and taught economics.

=== Title IX ===
During Newell's time as Acting Vice President at the University of Michigan, the school marked its 100th anniversary of the admission of their first female student, Madelon Stockwell, in 1970. Amid the social turmoil of the late 1960s and early 1970s, the university was being closely watched due to allegations by the U.S. Department of Health, Education, and Welfare (HEW) regarding discrimination in female employment and admissions. During the planning of celebrations for the historic event, it became apparent that the presence of women at the university was largely for appearance. Newell was one of only two women serving in a high-ranking administrative role, neither of which was a permanent position. The fact that only two women were appointed to the event-planning committee fueled criticism regarding men planning an event that was meant to celebrate the academic achievements of women.

In response, Newell formed another committee and led efforts to create a more education-based celebration spanning an October weekend. During the two-day teach-in, events including various panel discussions and workshops educated attendees on women's history and place in the university. The event served as an opportunity for women within the school to connect and communicate with one another. This event at the University of Michigan is one notable example of the work Newell put in to ensure women were receiving the education and resources of their male academic counterparts. Title IX, which prohibits discrimination on the basis of sex by educational institutions that receive federal funding, was enacted in June 1972, the first year of Newell's presidency at Wellesley College. This new law further influenced Newell to find a way to highlight and study the discrimination that women face. The Wellesley Centers for Women was Newell's creation that would focus on achieving this goal.

=== Wellesley Centers for Women ===
In 1974, Newell helped establish the Center for Research on Women in Higher Education and the Professions (CRW). She served on the Board of Overseers and the Interim Advisory Committee for the center. Newell envisioned that the CRW would defend Wellesley as a women's college, include women's issues in the college curriculum, and link education and employment for the students. In 1995, under President Diana Chapman Walsh's presidency, the CRW merged with the Stone Center for Developmental Services and Studies to form the Wellesley Centers for Women (WCW). Since then, the WCW have completed and continue to perform extensive research and innovative projects to promote gender equality, social justice, and human well-being. Newell's impact lasts to this day, and the Centers serve as a leading institution that takes action on various topics, such as education, child care, economic security, mental health, youth and adolescent development, gender-based violence, leadership, economic security, and society.

=== Mathematics Project ===
During her role in WCW, Newell implemented the Mathematics Project in 1976 "to bring back to the study of mathematics undergraduate women who have dropped out of mathematics early in their education, depriving themselves of career opportunities in a variety of fields." This program was developed with the Department of Mathematics of Wellesley and implemented with Wellesley students. On June 21, 1974, Newell and Federation President Irene Tinker quoted regarding the grant from the Carnegie Corporation: “The activities of the Center will provide a unique opportunity to study the subtle discrimination that women face in their career aspirations and choices and to develop effective programs to overcome such obstacles."

== Honors, affiliations, awards ==
=== Educational governance ===
- Massachusetts Institute of Technology, Member of Corporation, 1979-1984
- University of Pittsburgh Board of Trustees, 1973-1976
- Advisor to the Wesleyan University Board of Trustees, Middletown, Connecticut, 1970-1974

=== Educational associations ===
- National Association of Independent Colleges and Universities Board of Directors, 1977-1980
- Carnegie Foundation for the Advancement of Teaching Board of Trustees, 1976-1979
- Consortium on Financing Higher Education, Board of Directors, 1974-1975
- Vice Chairman of the American Council on Education, 1973-1976
- Southern Regional Education Board, 1981-1985

=== Education task forces and special projects ===
- Board Member, Committee on the Status of Women in the Economics Profession, American Economics Association, 1988-1991
- Chair, Evaluation of the University of Massachusetts for the Commission on Institutions of Higher Education, New England Association of Schools and Colleges, 1988
- Member, President's Commission on the Future of the University of Massachusetts, 1988–89
- Governor's Council on High Technology, Florida, 1983-1985
- National Association of State Universities and Land Grant Colleges, Ad Hoc Committee on the Future of the State Universities, 1984-1985
- Steering Committee on Presidents to Assist the Boston School Department, 1975-1979

=== Public service ===
- Secretary of the Dane County, Wisconsin Community Action Council, 1964-1966
- Board, Dane County Wisconsin, Community Welfare Council, 1964-1966
- Chair, National Commission on Medical Care for Women, American College of Obstetricians and Gynecologists, 1970-1972
- Trustee, Carnegie Endowment for International Peace, 1972-2004
- Board of Trustees of the Brookings Institution 1973-1970
- Boston Symphony Orchestra Board of Overseers 1974-1979
- WGBH Boston, Board of Overseers 1974-1979
- Editorial Board of Labor History, 1975-1979
- Committee for Economic Development 1979-1983
- Board, Americans for the Universality of UNESCO 1984-2000
- Florida Supreme Court Racial and Ethnic Bias Study Commission, 1990-1991
- Florida Education and Employment Council for Women and Girls 1992-1997

== Publications ==
Books:

- Our Labor Force, Curriculum Resources, 1962
- Chicago and the Labor Movement, University of Illinois Press, 1961

Book Chapter:

- “The Role of Women Presidents/Chancellors in Government Relations,” 1990, published as book chapter in Women at the Helm, American Association of State Colleges and Universities, 1991.

Articles:

- “Title VI Issues as Viewed from a Chancellor’s Office”, Desegregating America's Colleges and Universities, Title VI Regulation of Higher Education, Teachers College Press, Columbia University, 1988
- “Development and Education”, Newsletter, Americans for the Universality of UNESCO, Vol. III, Issue Three, September, 1987
- “Education with a World Perspective - A Necessity for America’s Political and Economic Defense”, Annals, Vol. 291, May, 1987
- “Has Collaboration Facilitated the Integration of Statewide Systems in Advancing Teacher Education”, Partnerships for Excellence, School/College Collaboration and Building Integrated Teacher Education Systems Statewide, Proceedings of the 1985 Summer Institute, Washington: Council of Chief State School Officers, 1986
- “How Florida Handled Admission Standards”, AGB Reports, January/February, 1986
- “Future of the State Universities: Continuing Education and Research in an Era of Science-Based Industries”, The Future of State Universities, Rutgers University Press, 1985
- “Florida Library Association, May 29, 1985, Orlando, Florida, Remarks”, Journal of Educational Media and Library sciences, Summer, 1985
- “The Changing Requirements for College Admission”, Change Magazine, November–December, 1984
- “Internationalizing Higher Education”, The Forum, National Mortar Board, Winter, 1984
- “Women in Higher Education”, 1977, International Encyclopedia of Higher Education
- Co-author, “Conversations of Faculty Productivity”, No. 11 in a series published by ARA Services, Inc. Philadelphia 1973
- “Social Pressures on Management - Equal Opportunity for Employment”, The Journal of College and University Personnel Association, Vol. 24, No. 1, December 1972
- “Enter Now and Pay Later”, Educational Record, Winter, 1970
- “Parallels of Negro and Women’s Education”, School and Society, October, 1970, pages 357-9
- “Co-ops on Campus: The Militant Consumers”, National, Vol.209, No. 20, December 8, 1969, pages 635-6
- “Impact for Change: Students in Action”, Women in Action, Center for Continuing Education of Women, University of Michigan, March 26, 1969, page 25

Film Strip:

- The Pulse of the Nation (with Lawrence Senesh), Join Council for Economic Education, 1961

Academic offices
Preceded by E. T. York	4th Chancellor of the State University System of Florida; 1981–1985	Succeeded by Charles B. Reed
