= H. Kim Bottomly =

American immunologist and administrator

13th President of Wellesley College
- In office August 1, 2007 – July 2016
- Preceded by: Diana Chapman Walsh
- Succeeded by: Paula A. Johnson

Personal details
- Born: Helen Kim Bottomly; January 30, 1946 (age 80) Helena, Montana, U.S.
- Spouse(s): Charles Janeway (died 2003) Wayne Villemez
- Education: University of Washington (BS, PhD)
- Website: Wellesley College

Helen Kim Bottomly (born January 30, 1946) is an American immunologist and the former president of Wellesley College, serving from August 2007 to July 2016. Bottomly was the first scientist to become a president at Wellesley College. She has been a member of the American Academy of Arts and Sciences since 2009. She chaired the board of directors of the Consortium on Financing Higher Education and was a member of the advisory council of the National Institutes of Allergy and Infectious Diseases at the National Institutes of Health. In May 2018, she was appointed as the chair of the board of the trustees for the Fulbright University Vietnam, which she stepped down from in 2019.

== Education ==
Bottomly attended the University of Washington (Seattle), graduated in 1969 with a degree in zoology. She then attended the University of Washington School of Medicine, receiving her PhD in biological structure in 1975. In 2008, Bottomly was named one of the University of Washington's 100 most remarkable alumni. She later did postdoctoral work in immunology at the National Institutes of Health from 1976 to 1979.

== President of Wellesley College ==
In 2007 she was named and assumed the duties of the 13th president of Wellesley College. Innovations made during Bottomly's presidency include launching the acclaimed Madeleine Korbel Albright Institute for Global Affairs, partnering with leading institutions of higher education around the world to educate women leaders, and making Wellesley the first liberal arts college to launch the online platform EdX, which had previously been used by Harvard University and Massachusetts Institute of Technology. Bottomly established a collaboration with nearby colleges, Olin College of Engineering and Babson College, and initiated a large-scale renovation and renewal of the college's historic buildings. In a letter to The New York Times editor in September 2011, she defended the value of the same-sex education. Following a feature in The New York Times Magazine in 2014, that was critical of Wellesley College's treatment of transgender students, Bottomly formed a committee to study gender identity, a process that lead in 2015 to Wellesley College changing its admission policies to accept transgender women.

Bottomly left her post at Wellesley in July 2016, after making the decision to step down. In a letter to the college community, she wrote:

There will never be an easy time to leave such a wonderful place, but this is the right time for me. With robust financial and intellectual resources in place, and with efforts to renew our celebrated campus well underway, the college is strongly positioned to move forward. I am confident that Wellesley will continue to build on this base to achieve all the goals and aspirations of this remarkable college.

== Academic career ==
=== Yale University ===
Bottomly served on the Yale University faculty from 1980 to 2007. At Yale, Bottomly was a professor of immunobiology and spearheaded research on the cellular and molecular causes of immune responses. Specifically, her research has investigated human response to allergens and why inhaled allergens lead to lung disease. Bottomly has written more than 179 peer-reviewed articles and has lectured widely at universities around the world. In 2005, she was appointed Deputy Provost of Science, Technology, and faculty development. As Deputy Provost, Bottomly led the university's policies surrounding natural sciences, anthropology, psychology, statistics, and linguistics, and was instrumental to the university's faculty diversity efforts and efforts to recruit and retain women in the sciences and underrepresented minorities in all fields. She also oversaw the Yale School of Engineering & Applied Science, the Yale School of Forestry & Environmental Studies, the Peabody Museum of Natural History, the Yale Institute for Biospheric Studies, and the Haskins Laboratories.

=== Journals, societies, and boards ===
Bottomly has been both editor and associate editor of the medical journal, Immunity, and a section editor and associate editor of the Journal of Immunology. Professional societies that she is a member of include the American Association for the Advancement of Science, as well as the American Association of Immunologists, where she has served on and chaired many elected and appointed committees. For example, she has chaired the Committee on Status of Women of the American Association of Immunologists and the Women's Committee of the Federation of American Societies of Experimental Biologists, and has been a member of the steering committee of Yale's Women Faculty Forum.

She was elected to the 229th class of the prestigious honorary society and center for policy research, the American Academy of Arts and Sciences, in 2009.

Bottomly serves as an Institutional Trustee at WGBH, a public television and radio station in Boston, Massachusetts.

Fulbright University Vietnam announced June 6, 2019, that Bottomly, who served as chairman of the Fulbright University Vietnam Board of Trustees since January 2018, had stepped down.

=== Research ===
While at Yale, Bottomly maintained a 16-person immunology laboratory at the Yale School of Medicine. She pioneered research in the physiological factors affiliated with allergic and asthmatic reactions and served as the principal investigator for numerous grants from the National Institutes of Health. In addition, she has served as a member of the Immunobiology Study Section at the National Institutes of Health, has been appointed to the Advisory Council of the National Institute of Allergy and Infectious Diseases, and has been a recipient of the very selective National Institutes of Health MERIT award. Bottomly published more than 175 refereed articles in scientific journals. She currently holds six patents.

== Personal life ==
Helen Kim Bottomly was born in the rural outskirts of Helena, Montana to Helen, a teacher and estate manager, and Forbes Bottomly, a naval officer. She has two daughters, Hannah and Megan, a step-daughter, Katherine, and two twin granddaughters with her first husband, the late Charles Janeway. Bottomly is married to Wayne Villemez, Professor Emeritus of Sociology at the University of Connecticut.
