= Helen Almira Shafer =

American educator (1839–1894)

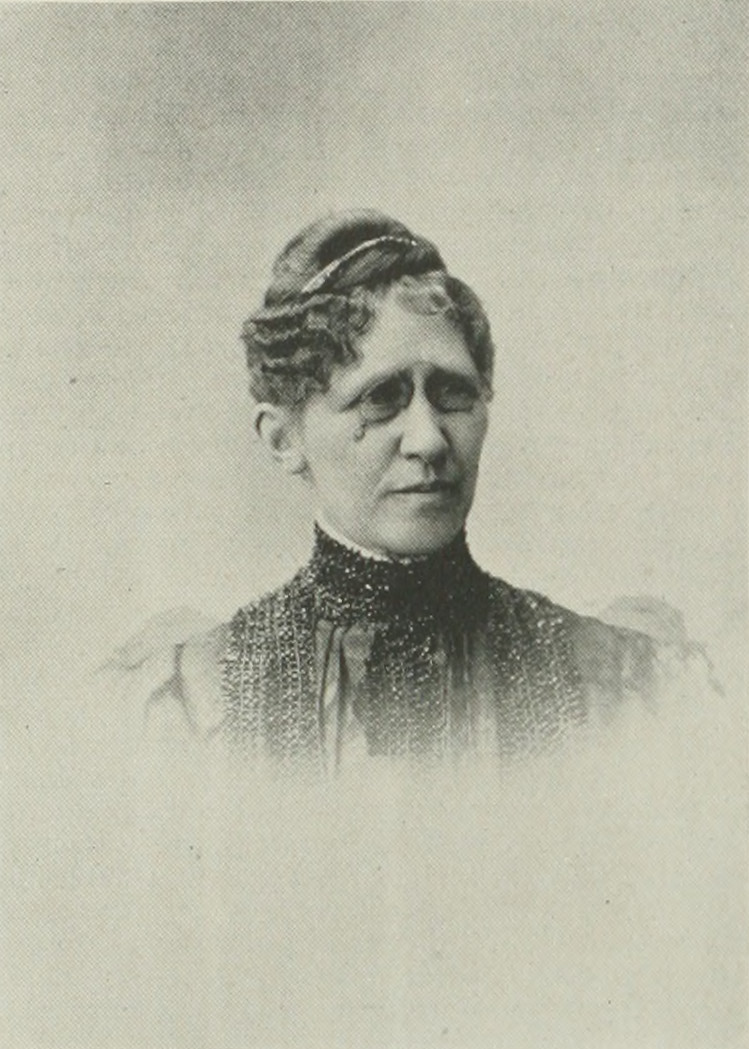
Portrait of Shafer from Willard & Livermore (1893)

Helen Almira Shafer (23 September 1839—20 January 1894) was an American educator and president of Wellesley College.

== Life ==
Helen Almira Shafer was born Newark, New Jersey on the 23 September 1839. Her father was a clergyman of the Congregational Church. She was educated in a seminary in Albion, New York, afterwards attending Oberlin College.

After graduating 1863, she taught in a school for young women in New Jersey, and for some years she was in charge of the advanced classes of the school. From 1865 to 1875 she was the teacher of mathematics in at Central High School in St. Louis, Missouri, where she attracted widespread attention for her superior methods of teaching algebra higher analytical mathematics. Professor W. T. Harris, then superintendent of the schools of St. Louis, ranked her as the most able and successful teacher of mathematics in the country.

In 1877 she became professor of mathematics at Wellesley College, filling the position until 1888, when she was elected president of the college. Her work in Wellesley College as professor of mathematics was marked by even greater results than she achieved in St. Louis. Her methods were widely imitated in other schools. She is said to have visibly advanced the standing of Wellesley and was described as one of the most prominent and successful educators and college administrators of the nineteenth century.

In 1893 Shafer was awarded by Oberlin College a Doctorate of Law, making her only the second American woman to receive such an honour. She died on the 20 January 1894 in Wellesley, Massachusetts. After her death the College raised $625 to commission a memorial to her. Shafer Hall, a residential building at Wellesley College, was named in her honor.
