= Julia Irvine =

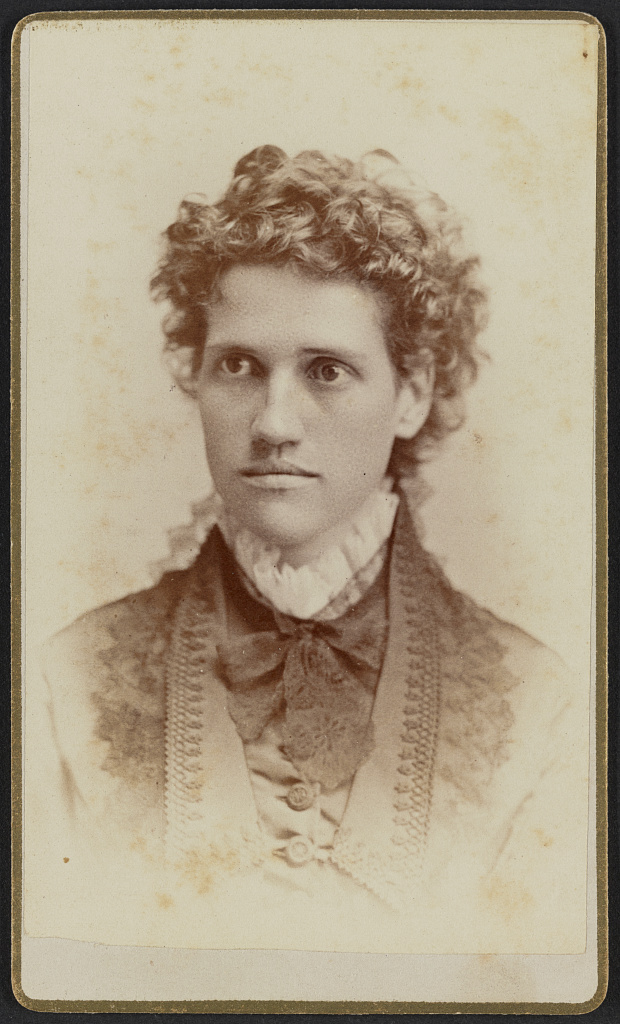
- Born: 1848
- Died: 1930 (aged 81–82)
- Alma mater: Cornell University
- Employer: Wellesley College

Julia Josephine Thomas Irvine (1848–1930) was the fourth president of Wellesley College, serving from 1894 to 1899.

Irvine was the daughter of Indiana suffragist Mary M. Thomas. A Cornell University graduate, she came to Wellesley College as a professor of Greek in 1890. During her tenure as Wellesley president, she enacted a number of reforms and eliminated some of the rules for students such as silent time, domestic work, the prohibition on Sunday library hours and mandatory Chapel attendance. She replaced several professors, especially those without advanced degrees, as part of an overhaul of academic departments.

She retired in 1899 and was succeeded as president by Caroline Hazard. She subsequently moved to France.
