= Margaret Clapp =

American educator (1910–1974)

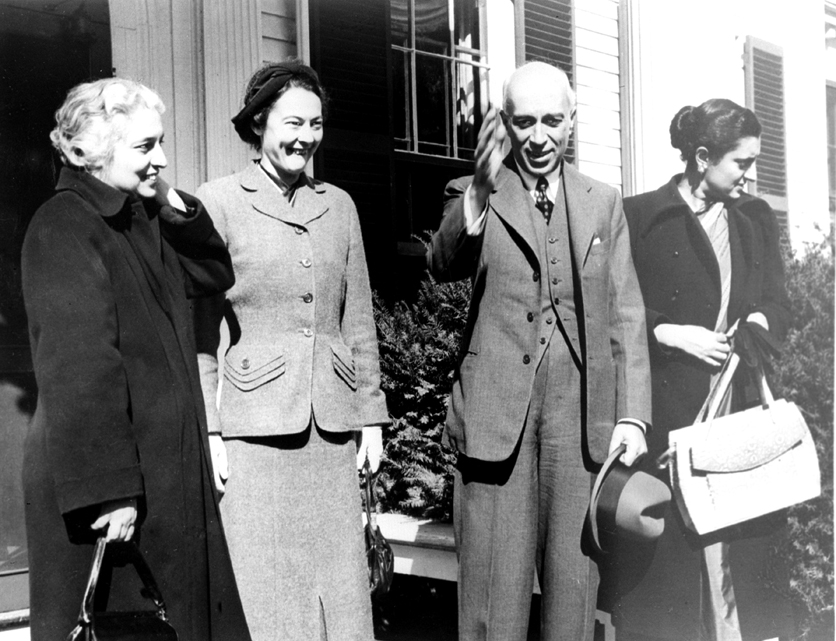
In October 1949, the Prime Minister of India, Jawaharlal Nehru, visited Wellesley College with his daughter, Shrimati Indira Gandhi. In this image, they are pictured on the step of the President's House on Wellesley College's campus. (Margaret Clapp is pictured second from the left).

Margaret Antoinette Clapp (April 10, 1910 – May 3, 1974) was an American scholar, educator, and writer. She won the Pulitzer Prize for her 1947 biography of American Civil War Union diplomat John Bigelow. She was the president of Wellesley College from 1949 to 1966.

During her presidency, she was able to make many improvements to the college campus by increasing the number of faculty members and increasing financial aid for students. Other accomplishments during her tenure included the construction and remodeling of major campus buildings and increasing the college endowment fund.

After her presidency, she moved to India in order to experience a new culture, stating that living in a different country with a different culture gave her a new perspective on her own culture. During her time there, she became the Minister Counselor of Public Affairs for the United States Embassy, becoming the first woman to hold such a position. In addition, she was the chief cultural officer for the United States Information Service India for three years. She was also the principal of the Lady Doak College in Madurai for two years. She stayed in India until 1971, when she returned to her Berkshire home to retire.

== Biography ==
Clapp was born in East Orange, New Jersey on April 10, 1910 to parents Alfred Chapin Clapp and Anna (Roth) Clapp. She had two brothers, future American politician Alfred C. and Oliver H. Clapp, and one sister, Lois Clapp Olds. In 1926 she graduated from East Orange High School and Wellesley College in 1930.

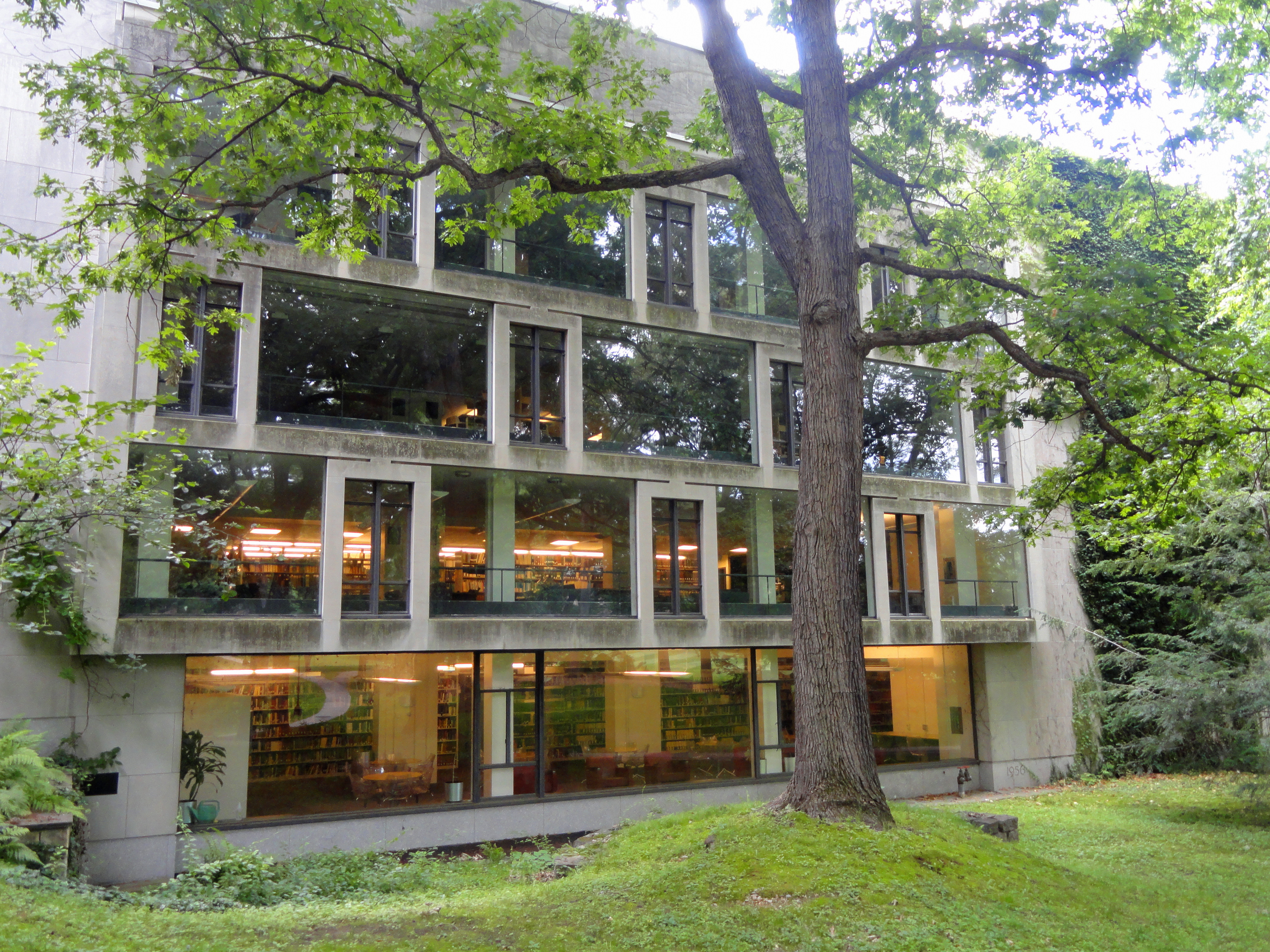
The library at Wellesley College

She taught English literature at the Todhunter School for Girls in New York City for twelve years while working on her master's degree, which she obtained from Columbia University in 1937.

During and after World War II, she taught history at City College of New York, Douglass College, Columbia University, and Brooklyn College.

While she was president of Wellesley College from 1949 until her retirement in 1966, the college's resources and facilities were expanded substantially. Clapp was a strong advocate of careers for women. She was elected a Fellow of the American Academy of Arts and Sciences in 1952.

After leaving Wellesley, Clapp served briefly as administrator of Lady Doak College, a women's college in Madurai, India, then as United States cultural attaché to India, then as minister-councilor of public affairs in the United States Information Agency until her retirement in 1971.

Clapp died of cancer on May 3, 1974 at the age of 64 in her Tyringham, Massachusetts home. A memorial service was held June 1, 1974 in Houghton Memorial Chapel on the Wellesley campus.

== Honorary degrees and awards ==
Margaret Clapp's doctoral dissertation at Columbia grew into the biography Forgotten First Citizen: John Bigelow published in 1947 and winner of the 1948 Pulitzer Prize for Biography or Autobiography. Clapp received honorary degrees from Smith College in 1949 and Wheaton College in 1960. In 1970, she received an honorary doctorate from Wellesley College. Wellesley College's library was renamed the Margaret Clapp Library in 1974, in honor of Clapp.

== Books ==
- Forgotten First Citizen: John Bigelow (Little, Brown, 1947)
- The Modern University (Cornell University Press, 1950), edited by Clapp
- Margaret Clapp's Chapel Talks: A Sampling (Wellesley College, 1980)

== See also ==
- List of covers of Time magazine (1940s) – Clapp was on the cover October 10, 1949
