= Madeleine Korbel Albright Institute for Global Affairs =

International affairs school at Wellesley College

The Madeleine Korbel Albright Institute for Global Affairs
- Logo of the Albright Institute
- Abbreviation: Albright Institute
- Formation: 2009; 17 years ago
- Founder: Madeleine Albright
- Type: Global affairs Institution, Women's Leadership Program
- Purpose: "[to harness] the power of the liberal arts to advance knowledge and foster global understanding"
- Headquarters: 106 Central St., Wellesley, MA 02481
- Location: Wellesley, MA
- Website: Official website

The Madeleine Korbel Albright Institute for Global Affairs (also known as the Albright Institute) is an international studies institute based at Wellesley College in Massachusetts. The Albright Institute was established by former United States Secretary of State Madeleine Albright in 2009 to support the interdisciplinary study of global issues within a liberal arts framework.

The Albright Institute organizes a variety of educational programs and public events, including fellowship and internship programs for undergraduate students as well as public events and lectures relating to current events and global issues. Approximately forty upperclasswomen undergraduate students from Wellesley College are selected annually as Albright Fellows. Notable speakers and visiting professors at the Albright Institute have included Madeleine Albright, Hillary Rodham Clinton, Christine Lagarde, Mark Malloch-Brown, Wendy Sherman, Samantha Power, Sri Mulyani Indrawati, and James Wolfensohn.

The Albright Institute is notable for its emphasis on women's leadership and its nontraditional approach to international studies, which incorporates research and perspectives on global affairs from disciplines including literature, the fine arts, religion, philosophy, and science.

== History ==
The Albright Institute was established with the intention of addressing world affairs from an unconventionally interdisciplinary approach, setting it apart from traditional international studies programs which emphasize history, political science, and economics.

Former US Secretary of State and diplomat Madeleine Albright graduated from Wellesley College in 1959 and has remained an active alumna and supporter of the college throughout her career. The idea for the Albright Institute originated during discussions between Albright and Wellesley College over the donation of working papers and materials accrued during Albright's career. Albright announced the creation of the institute during her keynote speech at her 50th class reunion in 2009, two years after serving as Wellesley's commencement speaker. Joanne Murray served as the founding director from 2009 to 2018. Joseph Joyce served as the first faculty director from 2009 to 2016. The current Program Director is Nina McKee and the Faculty Director is Stacie E. Goddard, Professor of Political Science at Wellesley College.

Albright drew upon her own experience as a political science major at Wellesley in the late 1950s while establishing the direction and philosophy of the Albright Institute. She cited her experience as a diplomat and serving as US Secretary of State under President Bill Clinton from 1997 to 2001 for leading her to recognize the multidimensional complexity of current events and global conflicts.

Diplomat Rick Barton of the Center for Strategic and International Studies voiced approval of the institute's approach to global affairs studies, stating that the institute "recognize[s] that this is a very complex challenge and you have to approach it in an integrated fashion. That's still not the norm. If Wellesley does it successfully, they will be ahead of others."

Former president of Wellesley College, H. Kim Bottomly, noted the importance of women's leadership development to both the Albright Institute and Wellesley College at large, stating that the Albright Institute "play[s] a critical role in Wellesley's education of future women leaders across the world." This sentiment was echoed by current Wellesley President Paula Johnson who cited the advancement of women's leadership as the "surest way to bring positive change to our fast-moving, complex world."

When Wellesley College underwent its decadal re-accreditation by the New England Commission of Higher Education (NECHE) in 2019, the NECHE cited the creation of the Albright Institute as an accomplishment for the college.

== Fellowship program ==
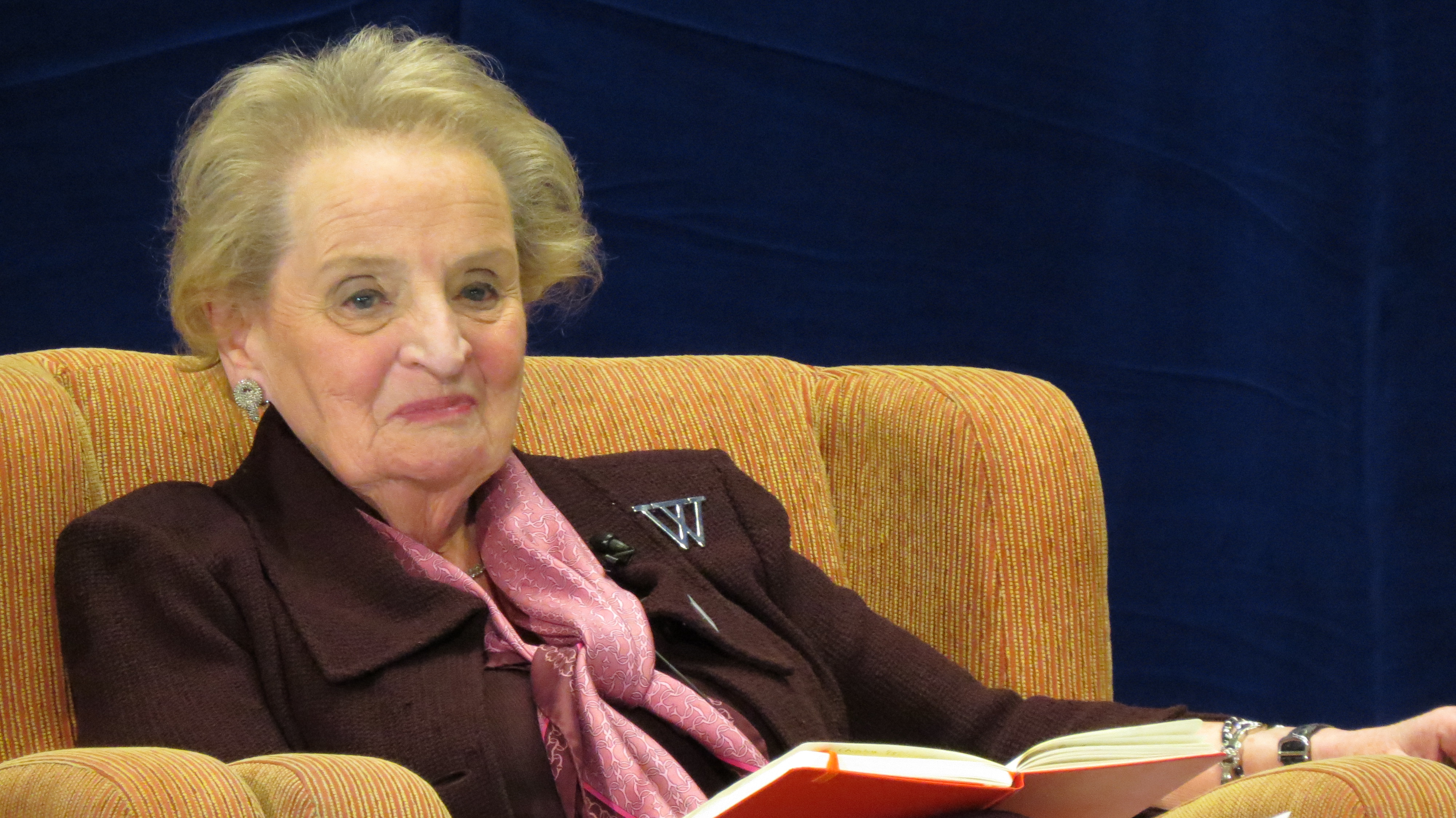
Madeleine Albright attending an Albright Institute event, wearing the logo pin of Wellesley College.

The Albright Institute organizes an annual fellowship program for undergraduates studying at Wellesley College. Around forty juniors and seniors are selected each year as "Albright Fellows" who participate in a three-week education and leadership program during the "Wintersession" scholastic term in January. The Albright Fellows program includes lectures, classes, and workshops with invited professors, researchers, and experts in a variety of disciplines. Following the January session, Fellows complete three-month summer internships addressing global issues around the world.

Numerous prominent women in American politics and diplomacy have participated in the Albright Fellows Wintersession program as Distinguished Visiting Professors or invited lecturers. Madeleine Albright has participated to some degree in every session since the program's inception, including as its inaugural Distinguished Visiting Professor. The Albright Institute has hosted multiple US Ambassadors and diplomats including Albright, Hillary Clinton, Wendy Sherman, Samantha Power, Elizabeth Cousins, and Victoria Nuland, as well as former U.S. Deputy Attorney General Sally Yates, former US diplomat Nicholas Burns and former White House Chief of Staff John Podesta.

Invited academics, scientists, and activists have included humanitarian leader Ophelia Dahl, Homi Kharas of the Brookings Institution, and astrophysicist Richard French who participated in NASA's Cassini Mission.

Wellesley College was founded as a historically women's liberal arts college and its admissions policy as of 2015 accepts applications from transgender women and non-binary people assigned female at birth. The Albright Institute, drawing applicants for its Albright Fellows program from the general Wellesley student body, therefore accepts cisgender and transgender women, as well as trans and non-binary students. Additionally, the Institute has awarded numerous Albright Fellowships to students in the Davis Degree Program, which confers Bachelor of Arts degrees to female-identified non-traditional students. The Albright Fellowship is unusual among American collegiate fellowship programs in global affairs for its focus on the career development of predominantly female-identified students and nontraditional students.

The Albright Institute manages additional internship programs with partners including the Albright Stonebridge Group, the Clinton Foundation, the National Democratic Institute, the Lobkowicz Palace, and the University of Cabo Verde. The Institute runs an online blog entitled The Spoke which publishes articles on domestic and global issues.

Madeleine Albright has used Albright Institute events as opportunities to connect with current Wellesley students and express personal reflections on her education and career. In 2012 Albright visited a student-run cooperative cafe on campus where she had worked and served as manager during her junior and senior years at Wellesley from 1957 to 1959. During a 2016 lunch event for Albright Fellows in which she discussed her path from refugee to college student to first female US Secretary of State, she stated "Madeleine Korbel did not become Madeleine Albright overnight. It takes time."

Albright is known for wearing decorative brooches (pins) to convey messages relating to politics, current events, and humor – a practice which was documented in her 2009 book Read My Pins: Stories from a Diplomat's Jewel Box and in a traveling exhibition of her personal jewelry collection at the Museum of Art and Design in New York City. During a visit to Wellesley College to promote her jewelry exhibition and book, Albright explained, "Wellesley was one of the first places that gave me the opportunity to engage with global politics, develop my political views and explore creative ways to express those views so it’s only fitting to bring pins and politics back to Wellesley." In keeping with Albright's penchant for symbolic pin-wearing, the Albright Institute created numerous commemorative pins which are given to Albright Fellows and affiliates of the institute. A silversmith from the nearby town of Natick, Massachusetts, designed a pin for the Albright Institute in 2010 in celebration of the first class of Albright Fellows and another in 2016 at the first fellows' reunion. Every pin was made by hand and the 2016 design featured a globe inlaid with gold bars and diamonds to represent the Albright Fellows "emanating from the globe."

== Public events ==
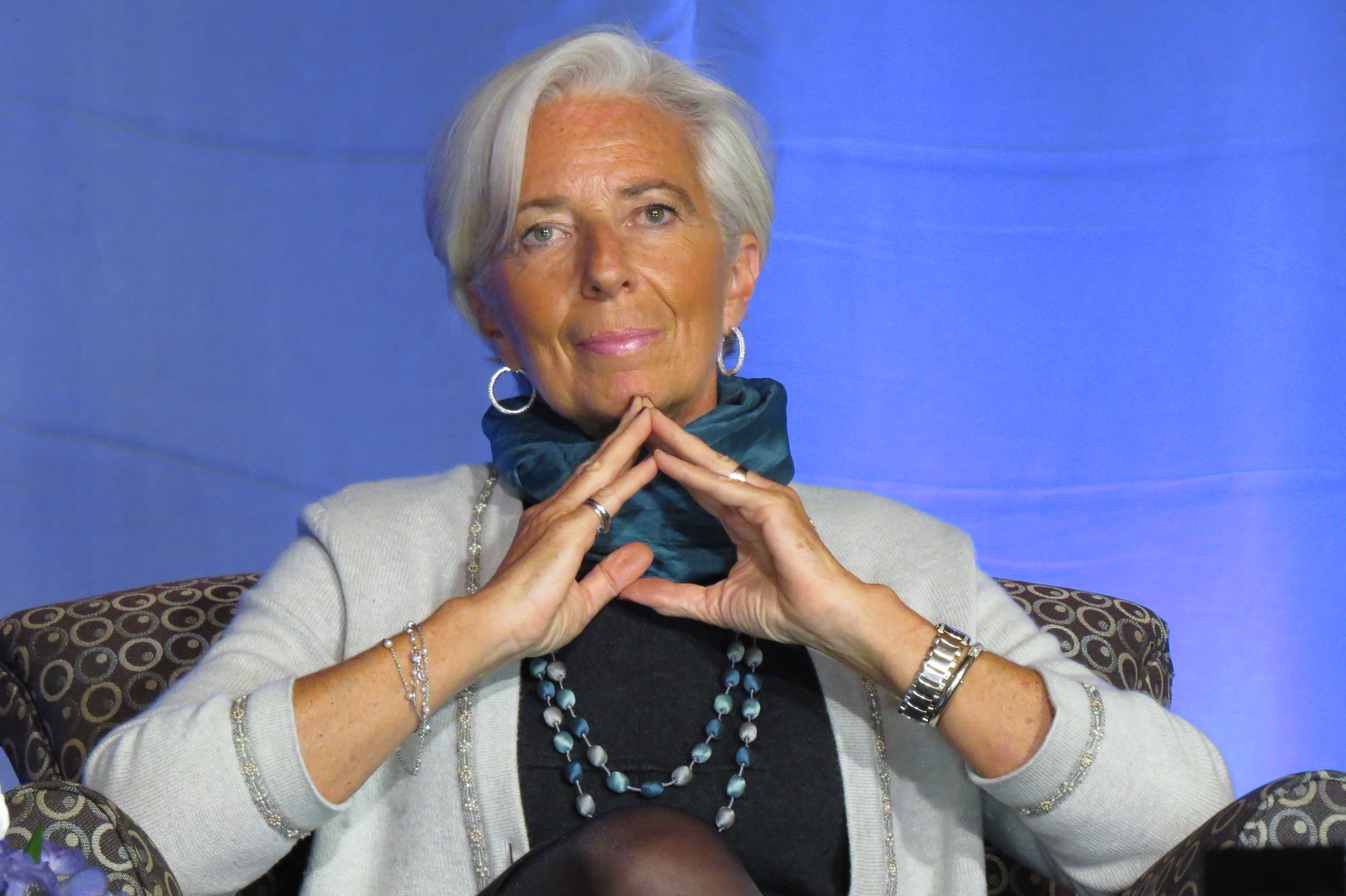
Christine Lagarde on stage at an Albright Institute event at Wellesley College where she stated "inequality is sexist"

Public lectures organized by the Albright Institute address a variety of topics relating to current affairs and have generated media coverage. In 2016, the Albright Institute held a symposium entitled "Impact Albright" which discussed global inequality in a series of public lectures with prominent leaders in global affairs and attracted coverage by major media outlets. Invited speakers included Madeleine Albright, International Monetary Fund Managing Director Christine Lagarde, Managing Director of the World Bank Group Sri Mulyani Indrawati, and Mark Malloch-Brown who served as UN Deputy Secretary General and UNDP Administrator from 1999 to 2005.

Remarks made by IMF director Christine Lagarde on gender inequality, and specifically her quote that "inequality is sexist," garnered coverage by CNN, CNBC, the Associated Press and elsewhere. Lagarde highlighted the gender pay gap and lack of economic opportunities for women as adversely affecting global economic growth, stressing the need for policy change. Madeleine Albright spoke about the moral and economic necessity of addressing the Syrian refugee crisis, which she described as a consequence of "failed diplomacy" and contrasted with the Cold War, stating "the world [back then] was divided between the 'red' and the 'red white and blue' and at this point, it is hard to keep track of who is who.”

The Albright Institute organizes the biannual Kenner Lecture series which invites prominent academics, politicians, and diplomats as speakers. United States Under Secretary for Political Affairs Wendy R. Sherman spoke about her diplomatic career and a variety of current events during her Kenner Lecture in 2015. In 2016, former finance minister of Greece George Papaconstantinou discussed his book, Game Over: The Inside Story of the Greek Crisis, and his perspective on the Greek financial crisis. During an event commemorating the 10th anniversary of the Albright Institute and its Albright Fellows program, US Ambassador Susan Rice commented on US-Iranian relations and the Persian Gulf crisis in addition to discussing a recently published memoir and reflecting on her career and time working in the Obama administration.

Numerous prominent alumna of Wellesley College have participated in Albright Institute lectures and public talks, including Ophelia Dahl, co-founder of Partners in Health, and International Food Policy Research Institute Chief of Staff Rajul Pandya-Lorch. A 2012 public talk featured Albright, Wellesley alumna Elaine Botwinick Wolfensohn and her husband, former World Bank president James Wolfensohn.

== Notable people ==
Notable figures who have participated in Albright Institute events include the following:

- Madeleine Albright – first female United States Secretary of State, politician and diplomat
- H. Kim Bottomly – Immunologist and the former president of Wellesley College
- Mark Malloch-Brown – former United Nations Development Programme Administrator
- Nicholas Burns – American diplomat
- Erica Chenoweth - Berthold Beitz Professor in Human Rights and International Affairs at Harvard Kennedy School, Expert on political violence and civil resistance
- Hillary Rodham Clinton – former First Lady of the United States and United States Secretary of State, first woman to win popular vote in an American presidential election
- Elizabeth Cousens - former U.S. Ambassador to the UN Economic and Social Council and Alternate Representative to the UN General Assembly (2012–14)
- Ophelia Dahl – President and executive director of Partners In Health
- Atifete Jahjaga - former President of the Republic of Kosovo
- Paula Johnson – Cardiologist and current president of Wellesley College
- Homi Kharas – Economist at the Brookings Institution
- Christine Lagarde – former International Monetary Fund Managing Director
- Andrea Mitchell – NBC television anchor
- Katharine Moon – Professor of Political Science of Wellesley College; Expert on North Korea at the Brookings Institution's Center for East Asia Policy Studies
- Sri Mulyani Indrawati – World Bank Managing Director
- George Papaconstantinou – economist, politician and former Greek Minister for Finance
- John Podesta – Chief of staff to former President Bill Clinton
- Henry M. Paulson, Jr. - U.S. Secretary of the Treasury (2006 - 2009)
- Susan Rice - former National Security Advisor (2013-2017), U.S. Ambassador to the United Nations (2009-2013)
- Wendy R. Sherman – former United States Under Secretary for Political Affairs
- James Wolfensohn – former World Bank president
- Sally Yates – former U.S. Deputy Attorney General
