= Paula Johnson =

American cardiologist (born 1959)

14th President of Wellesley College
- Incumbent
- Assumed office July 1, 2016
- Preceded by: H. Kim Bottomly

Personal details
- Born: Paula Adina Johnson; 1959 (age 66–67) New York, U.S.
- Spouse: Robert Sands
- Education: Radcliffe College (BS); Harvard University (MD, MPH)

Paula Adina Johnson (born 1959) is an American cardiologist and the current president of Wellesley College. She is the first Black woman to serve in this role.

Prior to her role as president of Wellesley, Johnson founded and served as the inaugural executive director of the Mary Horrigan Connors Center for Women's Health & Gender Biology, as well as Chief of the Division of Women's Health at Brigham and Women's Hospital.

== Early life and education ==
Paula Johnson was born and raised in New York. She grew up in Brooklyn and has one sister.

Johnson graduated from Samuel J. Tilden High School in Brooklyn. She then attended Radcliffe College, where she majored in biology and graduated in 1980. Afterward, she attended Harvard Medical School. Developing an interest clinical epidemiology, she also studied at the Harvard School of Public Health. In 1985, she received her medical doctor's degree (M.D.) and a master's in public health (MPH) degrees from Harvard.

== Medical career ==
After graduating, Johnson began a residency in internal medicine and cardiovascular medicine at Brigham and Women's Hospital, where she decided to specialize in cardiology. In 1990, she became the first African American ever to hold the position of chief medical resident at the hospital.

Johnson worked in the hospital's cardiac transplant unit and served as director of Quality Management Services. As chief of the Division of Women's Health, she focused on women's access to cardiology care and the quality of that care. Johnson has also focused much of her work on educating and empowering African-American women, who are 50 percent more likely to die of cardiovascular disease than white women.

Johnson was the Grace A. Young Family Professor of Medicine in the field of women's health, an endowed professorship named in honor of her mother, at Harvard Medical School. She was also Professor of Epidemiology at the Harvard T.H. Chan School of Public Health. She is a member of the National Academy of Medicine and has been featured as a national leader in medicine by the National Library of Medicine.

== Wellesley College presidency ==
Paula Johnson began working at Wellesley College on July 1, 2016. In the 2020 fiscal year, Johnson was compensated $585,640 with an additional estimated bonus of $138,371 in her role as College President. Johnson is the third highest paid employee of Wellesley College.

During the COVID-19 Pandemic in 2020, Paula Johnson joined Massachusetts Governor Baker's 14-member Higher Education Working Group (HEWG) to develop a framework to safely reopen campuses. In June 2020, she also joined a WBUR digital town hall to analyze how COVID-19 revealed and exacerbated racial inequalities with U.S. Representative Ayanna Pressley and Dr. Mary Travis Bassett. In 2021, Johnson was nominated to the Governance and Nominating Committee, through the board of directors at Abiomed. In 2023, Johnson was appointed to the board of directors at Johnson & Johnson.

== Personal life ==
Johnson resides in Wellesley, Massachusetts, with her family. She is married to Robert Sands, a rheumatologist at Atrius Health of Harvard University, and has a son and a daughter.
