= Wellesley College =

Women's college in Wellesley, Massachusetts, US

- Former name: Wellesley Female Seminary (1870–1873)
- Motto: Non Ministrari sed Ministrare (Latin)
- Motto in English: Not to be ministered unto, but to minister
- Type: Private women's liberal arts college
- Established: 1870 (chartered); 1875 (commenced classes)
- Accreditation: NECHE
- Academic affiliations: Annapolis Group; CLAC; COFHE; NAICU; Oberlin Group; Seven Sisters; Space-grant
- Endowment: $3.19 billion (2025)
- President: Paula A. Johnson
- Faculty: 338 (fall 2024)
- Undergraduates: 2,285 (fall 2025)
- Location: Wellesley, Massachusetts, United States; 42°17′33″N 71°18′27″W
- Campus: Suburban (college town), 500 acres (200 ha)
- Colors: Wellesley Blue
- Nickname: Blue
- Sporting affiliations: NCAA Division III – NEWMAC; NEISA
- Mascot: The Blue
- Website: wellesley.edu

Wellesley College is a private women's liberal arts college in Wellesley, Massachusetts, United States. Founded in 1870 by Henry and Pauline Durant as a female seminary, it is one of the Seven Sisters Colleges, an unofficial grouping of women's colleges in the northeastern United States.

Wellesley enrolls approximately 2,500 students, including transgender, non-binary and genderqueer students since 2015. It contains 60 departmental and interdepartmental majors spanning the liberal arts, as well as over 150 student clubs and organizations. Wellesley athletes compete in the NCAA Division III New England Women's and Men's Athletic Conference. Its 500-acre (200 ha) campus was designed by Frederick Law Olmsted and houses the Davis Museum and a botanic garden.

== History ==
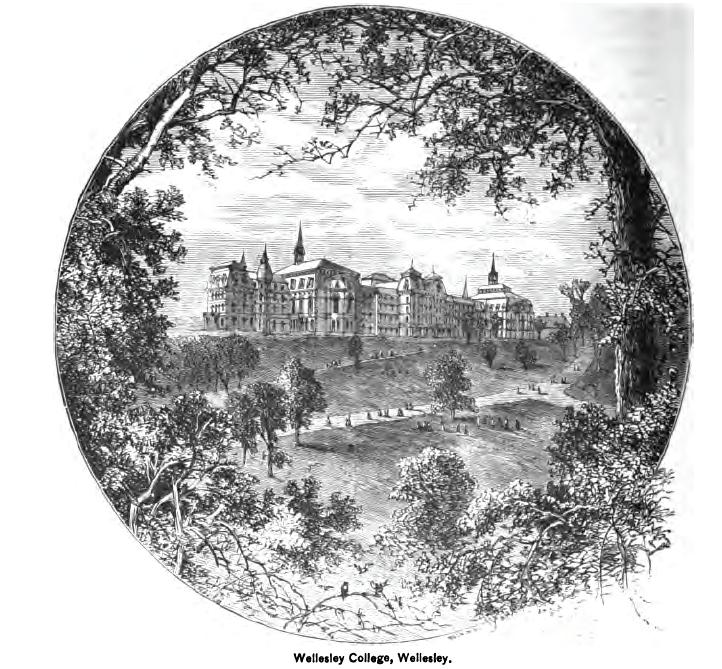
Campus of Wellesley College as it appeared c. 1880

Wellesley was founded by Pauline and Henry Fowle Durant, believers in educational opportunity for women, who intended that the college should prepare women for "great conflicts, for vast reforms in social life". Its charter was signed on March 17, 1870, by Massachusetts governor William Claflin. The original name of the college was the "Wellesley Female Seminary"; its renaming to Wellesley College was approved by the Massachusetts legislature on March 7, 1873. Wellesley first opened its doors to students on September 8, 1875. At the time of its founding, Wellesley College's campus was actually situated in Needham; however, in 1880 residents of West Needham voted to secede and in 1881 the area was chartered as a new town, Wellesley.

Wellesley College was a leading center for women's study in the sciences. Between 1875 and 1921, Wellesley employed more female scientists than any other U.S. institution of high education. After MIT, it was the second college in the United States to initiate laboratory science instruction for undergraduates. In early 1896, Sarah Frances Whiting, the first professor of physics and astronomy, was among the first U.S. scientists to conduct experiments in X-rays.

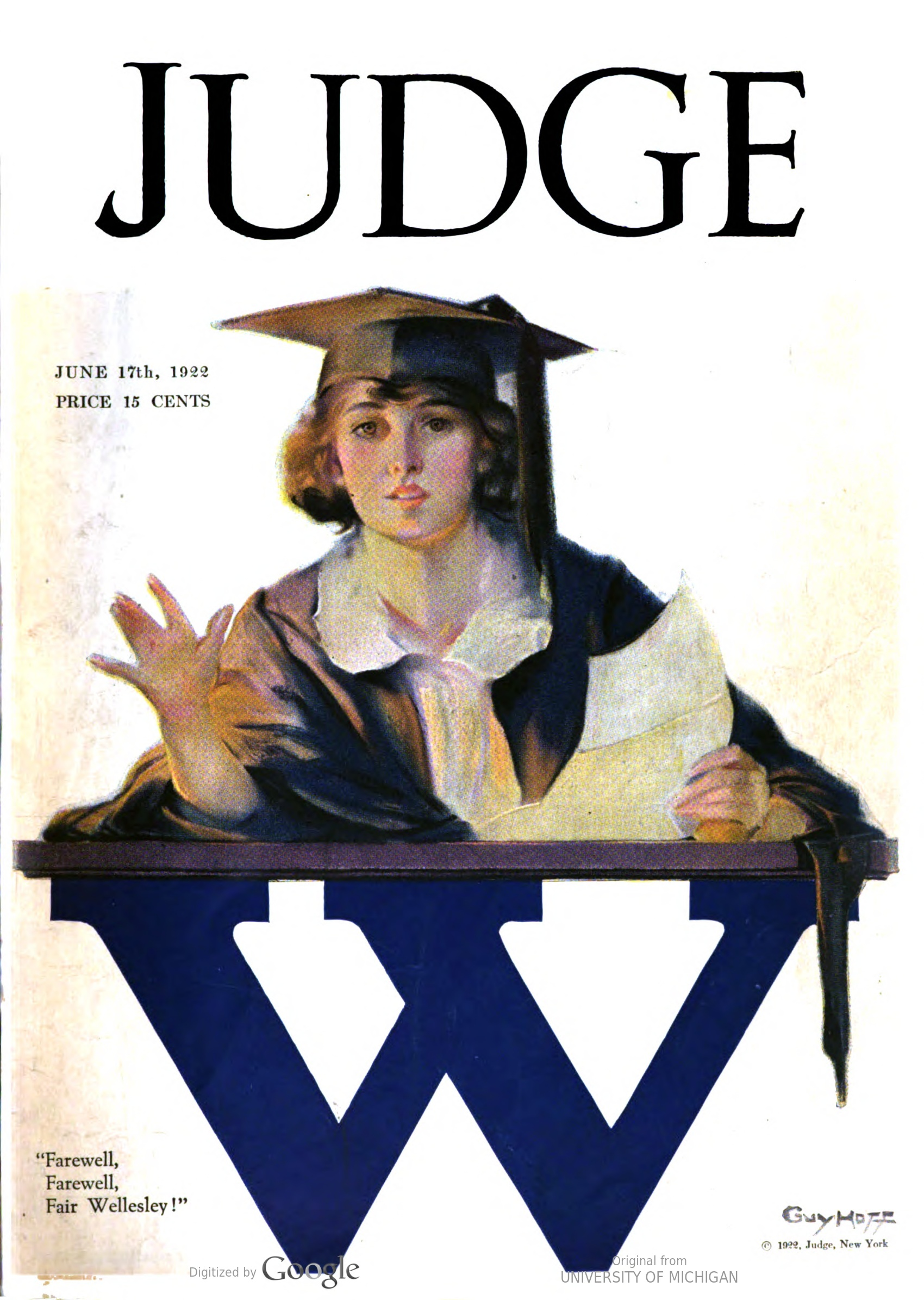
1922 cover of Judge depicting a Wellesley graduate

The first president of Wellesley was Ada Howard. There have been thirteen more presidents in its history: Alice Freeman Palmer, Helen Almira Shafer, Julia Irvine, Caroline Hazard, Ellen Fitz Pendleton, Mildred H. McAfee, Margaret Clapp, Ruth M. Adams, Barbara W. Newell, Nannerl O. Keohane (later the president of Duke University from 1993 to 2004), Diana Chapman Walsh, H. Kim Bottomly, and incumbent president Paula Johnson.

The original architecture of the college consisted of one very large building, College Hall, which was approximately 150 metres (490 ft) in length and five stories in height. It was completed in 1875. The architect was Hammatt Billings. College Hall was both an academic building and a residential building. On March 17, 1914, it was destroyed by fire, the precise cause of which was never officially established. The fire was first noticed by students who lived on the fourth floor near the zoology laboratory. It has been suggested that an electrical or chemical accident in this laboratory—specifically, an electrical incubator used in the breeding of beetles—triggered the fire.

A group of residence halls known as the Tower Court complex is located on top of the hill where the old College Hall once stood.

After the loss of the Central College Hall in 1914, the college adopted a master plan in 1921 and expanded into several new buildings. The campus hosted a Naval Reserve Officer Training program during the Second World War, and the College President Mildred McAfee took a leave of absence to lead the Women's Reserve of the U.S. Navy. She received the Distinguished Service Medal in 1945. Wellesley College began to significantly revise its curriculum after the war and through the late 1960s; in 1968, the college began its exchange programs between other colleges in the area such as MIT. In 2013 the faculty adopted an open-access policy to make its scholarship publicly accessible online.

The school has admitted transgender, non-binary, and genderqueer students since adopting an inclusive admissions policy in 2015. In 2023, the majority of students voted to admit transgender men in a nonbinding referendum..

== Campus ==
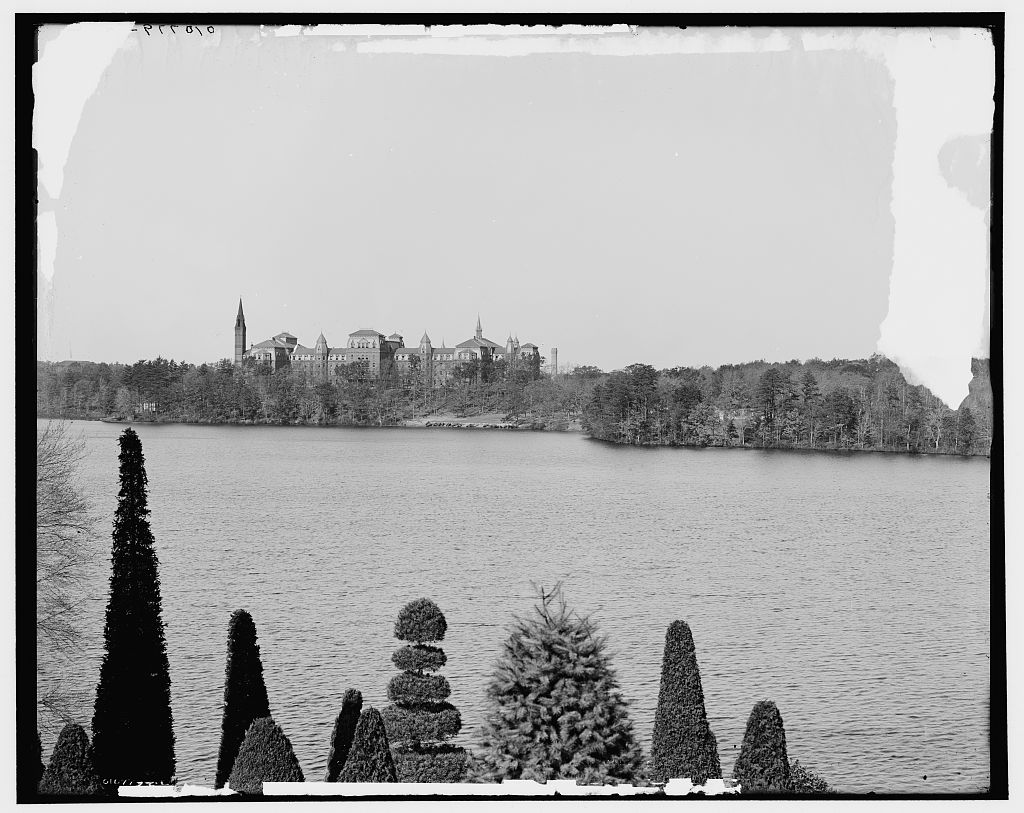
A view of Wellesley College (background) in 1904 from across Lake Waban, with the topiary hedges of the Hunnewell Estate and Gardens in the foreground.

The 500-acre (200 ha) campus overlooks Lake Waban and includes evergreen, deciduous woodlands and open meadows. Frederick Law Olmsted Jr., Boston's preeminent landscape architect at the beginning of the 20th century, described Wellesley's landscape as "not merely beautiful, but with a marked individual character not represented so far as I know on the ground of any other college in the country". He also wrote: "I must admit that the exceedingly intricate and complex topography and the peculiarly scattered arrangement of most of the buildings somewhat baffled me". The campus is adjacent to the privately owned Hunnewell Estates Historic District, the gardens of which can be viewed from the lake's edge on campus.

The original master plan for Wellesley's campus landscape was developed by Olmsted, Arthur Shurcliff, and Ralph Adams Cram in 1921. This landscape-based concept represented a break from the architecturally defined courtyard and quadrangle campus arrangement that was typical of American campuses at the time. The 720-acre (2.9 km^{2}) site's glaciated topography, a series of meadows, and native plant communities shaped the original layout of the campus, resulting in a campus architecture that is integrated into its landscape.

The campus offers multiple housing options, including Tower Court, which was built after College Hall burnt down, the Quad (Quint, including Munger), the "New Dorms", referring to the east-side dormitories erected in the 1950s, and multiple "Branch Halls", including both a Spanish and French-speaking house. In total, Wellesley offers 17 different residence halls for students to live in.

The most recent master plan for Wellesley College was completed in 1998 by Michael Van Valkenburgh Associates. According to the designers, this plan was intended to restore and recapture the original landscape character of the campus that had been partially lost as the campus evolved through the 20th century. In 2011, Wellesley was listed by Travel+Leisure magazine as one of the most beautiful college campuses in the United States.

Wellesley is home to Green Hall, completed in 1931, the only building bearing the name of famed miser Hetty Green; the building was funded by her children. Part of the building is the Galen L. Stone Tower, housing a 32-bell carillon, which is routinely played between classes by members of the Guild of Carillonneurs.

Houghton Chapel was dedicated in 1899 in the center of the college campus. The architectural firm of Heins & LaFarge designed Houghton of gray stone in the classic Latin cross floor plan. The exterior walls are pierced by stained glass windows. Window designers include Tiffany; John La Farge; Reynolds, Francis & Rohnstock; and Jeffrey Gibson. The chapel can seat up to 750 people. Houghton is used by the college for a variety of religious and secular functions, like lectures and music concerts, and is also available for rental. The lower-level houses the Multifaith Center.

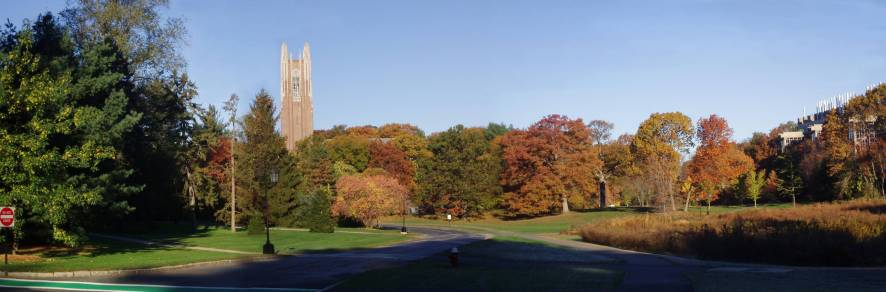
Wellesley College campus, fall 2006

In 1905 Andrew Carnegie donated $125,000 to build what is now known as Clapp Library, on the condition that the college match the amount for an endowment. The money was raised by 1907 and construction began June 5, 1909. In 1915 Carnegie gave another $95,446 towards an addition. This renovation added a recreational reading room, offices, archives, a reserve reading room, added space for rare books and additional stacks. The building underwent renovations from 1956 to 1959, that doubled its size. From 1973 to 1975 a major addition was added to the right-hand side of the building. In 1974 the building was renamed for Margaret Antoinette Clapp, a Pulitzer Prize-winning author and member of the 1930 class who served as the eighth college president from 1949 to 1966.

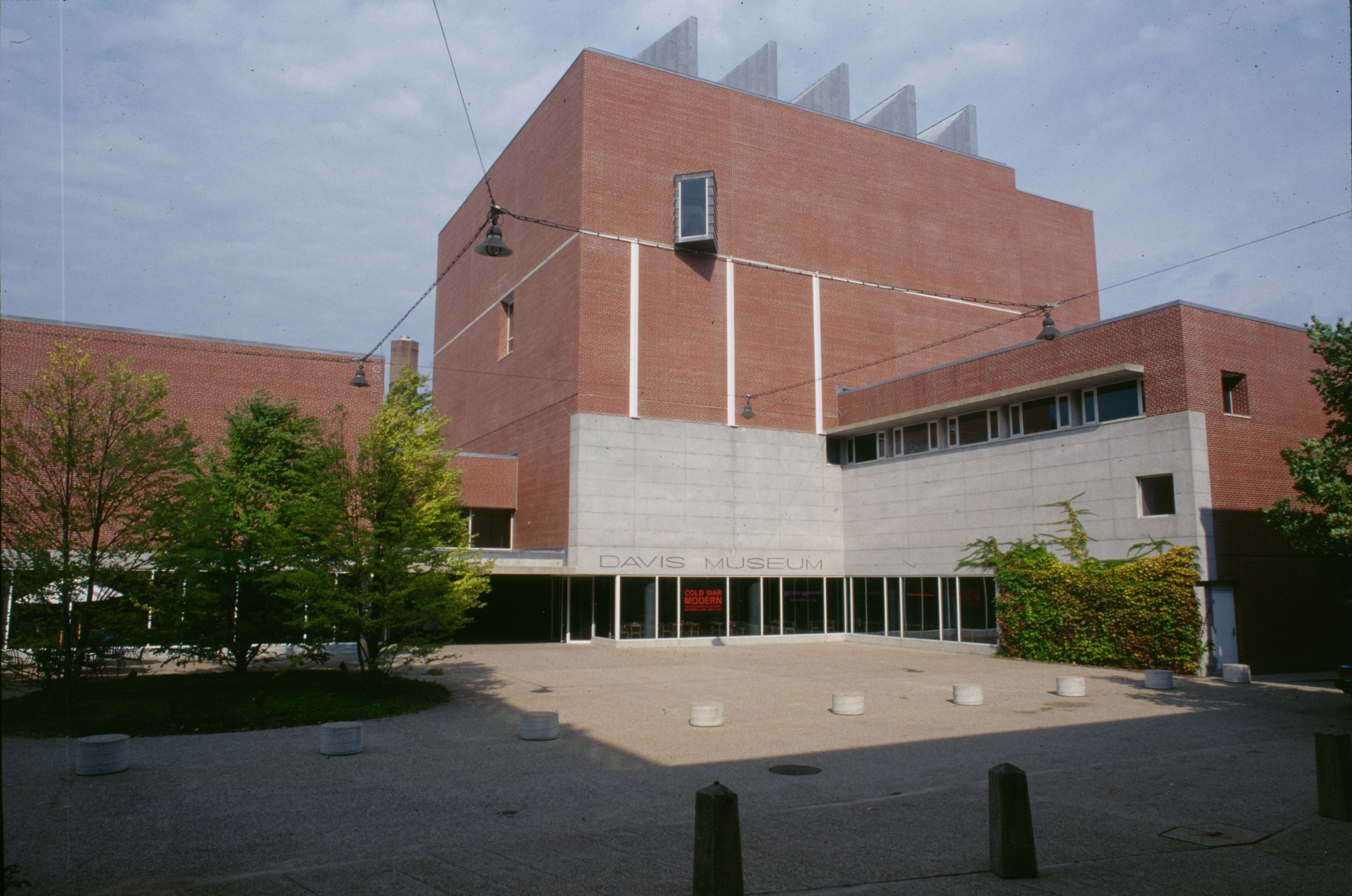
The Davis Museum art collections are open to the public

The Davis Museum, opened in 1993, was the first building in North America designed by Pritzker Prize-winning architect Rafael Moneo, whose notion of the museum as a "treasury" or "treasure chamber" informs its design. The Davis is at the heart of the arts on the Wellesley campus adjacent to the academic quad and is connected by an enclosed bridge to the Jewett Arts Center, designed by Paul Rudolph. The collections span from ancient art from around the world to contemporary art exhibitions, and admission is free to the general public.

== Administration ==
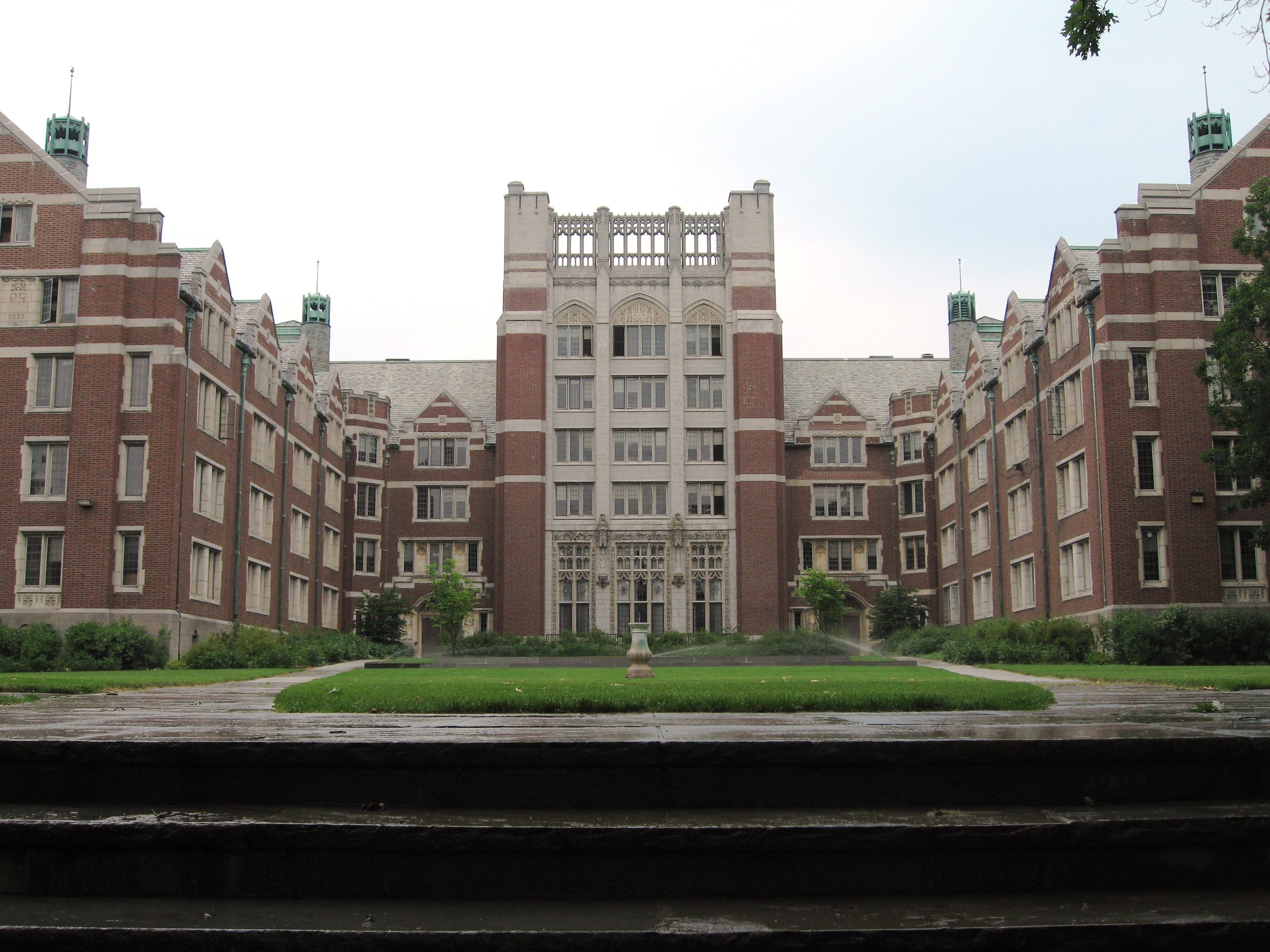
Tower Court is the largest dorm

The president of Wellesley College is Paula Johnson. She previously founded the Connors Center for Women's Health and Gender Biology at Brigham and Women's Hospital, and was the Grace A. Young Family Professor of Medicine in the Field of Women's Health at Harvard Medical School, as well as professor of epidemiology at the Harvard T.H. Chan School of Public Health. Johnson succeeded H. Kim Bottomly to become Wellesley's 14th President in July 2016.

Wellesley's fund-raising campaign in 2005 set a record for liberal arts colleges with a total of $472.3 million, 18.1% more than the goal of $400 million. According to data compiled by The Chronicle of Higher Education, Wellesley's campaign total is the largest of any liberal arts college. In late 2015, the college launched another campaign, with a goal of $500 million. Many alumnae including Madeleine Albright, Hillary Clinton, Diane Sawyer, Susan Wagner, and Cokie Roberts collaborated on the campaign video and launch festivities. As of Fall 2017, over $446 million has been raised.

== Wellesley Centers for Women ==
The Wellesley Centers for Women (WCW) is one of the largest gender-focused social science research-and-action organizations in the United States. Located on and nearby the Wellesley College campus, WCW was established when the Center for Research on Women (founded 1974) and the Stone Center for Development Services and Studies at Wellesley College (founded 1981) merged into a single organization in 1995. It is home to several prominent American feminist scholars, including Jean Kilbourne and Peggy McIntosh. The executive director of the Wellesley Centers for Women is Layli Maparyan. Since 1974, the Wellesley Centers for Women has produced over 200 scholarly articles and over 100 books.

The Wellesley Centers for Women has five key areas of research: education, economic security, mental health, youth and adolescent development, and gender-based violence. WCW is also home to long-standing action programs that engage in curriculum development and training, professional development, evaluation, field building, and theory building. Those programs include the National SEED Project, the National Institute on Out-of-School Time, Open Circle, the Jean Baker Miller Training Institute, and Women's Review of Books.

== Academics ==
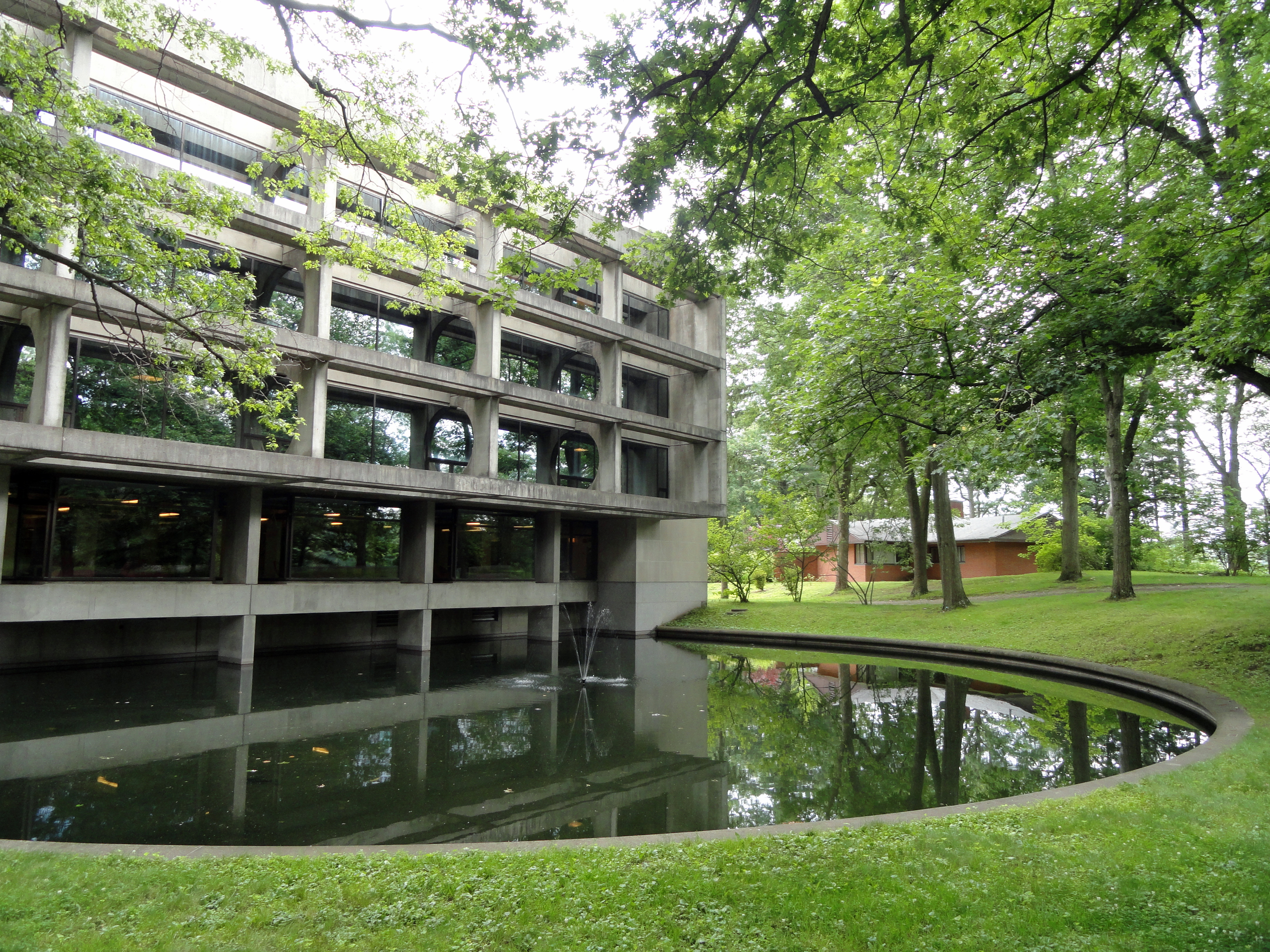
Margaret Clapp Library

Wellesley's average class size is between 17 and 20 students, with a student-faculty ratio of 7:1. 60 departmental and interdepartmental majors are offered, and students have the option to propose their own major.

Wellesley offers support to nontraditional aged students through the Elisabeth Kaiser Davis Degree Program, open to students over the age of 24. The program allows women who, for various reasons, were unable to start or complete a bachelor's degree at a younger age to attend Wellesley.

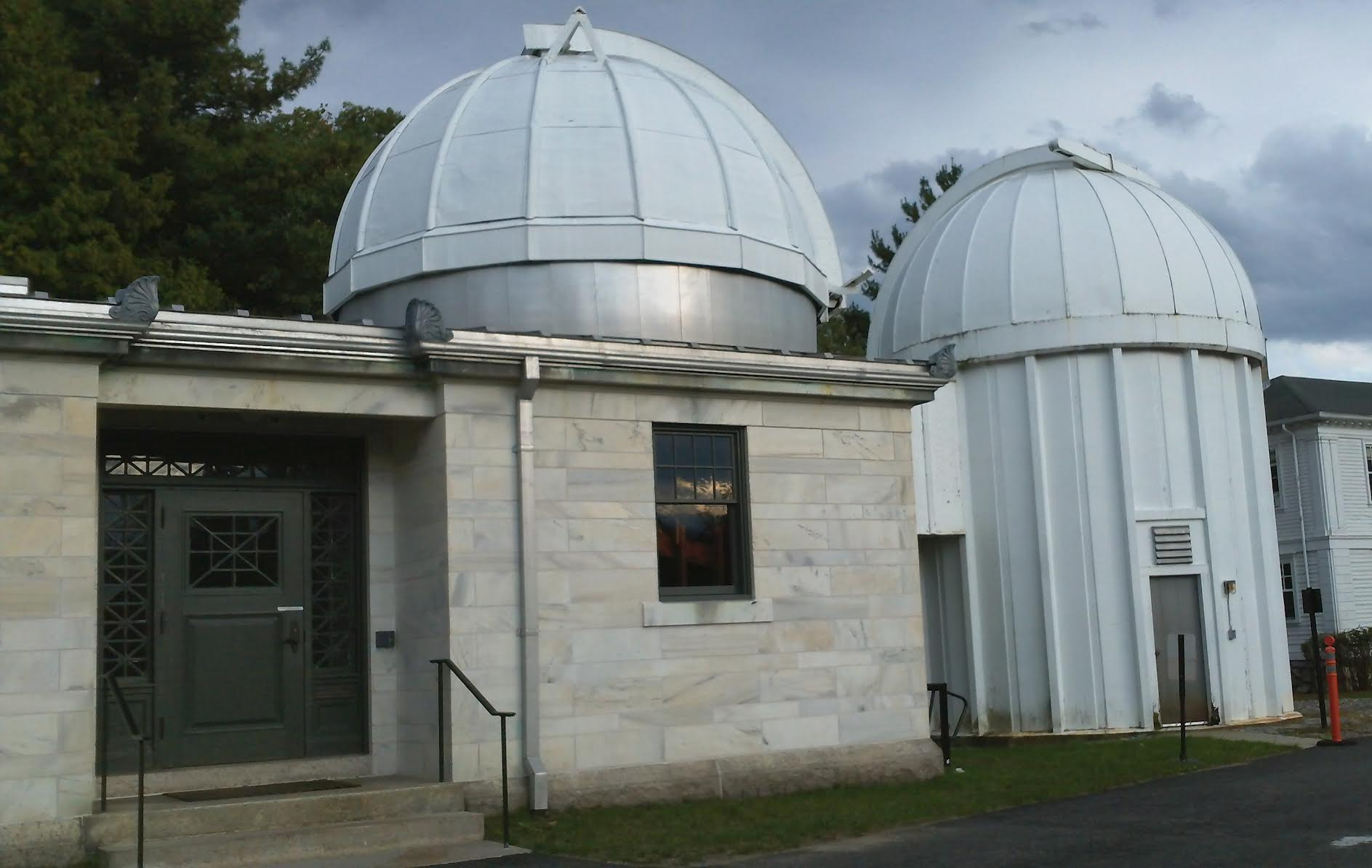
The Whitin Observatory is home to the Astronomy department, and occasionally has viewing nights open to the public.

Wellesley offers dual degree programs with the Massachusetts Institute of Technology and the Olin College of Engineering, enabling students to receive a Bachelor of Science at those schools in addition to a Bachelor of Arts at Wellesley. Wellesley also has a joint five-year BA/MA program with Brandeis University's International Business School, which allows qualified Wellesley students to receive a Masters of Arts degree from the school, as well as a Bachelor of Arts at Wellesley. Wellesley also participates in a three-way collaboration with Babson College, a business school also located in Wellesley, and Olin College.

Its most popular majors, based on 2023 graduates, were:

- Economics (94)
- Computer Sciences (67)
- Psychology (53)
- Political Science (45)
- Biological Sciences (37)
- Neuroscience (35)
- Mathematics (27)
- English (27)

=== Admissions ===
Fall Admission Statistics
	2021	2019	2018	2017	2016	2015
Applicants	7,920	6,395	6,631	5,666	4,854	4,555
Admits	1,240	1,379	1,296	1,251	1,388	1,380
% Admitted	16	21.6	19.5	22.1	28.6	30.3
Enrolled	606	612	614	605	590	595
Mid 50% SAT range	1479	1370–1510	1330–1520	1360–1530	1970–2250	1940–2240
Mid 50% ACT range	33	31–34	30–34	30–33	30–33	29–33

The 2020 annual ranking of U.S. News & World Report categorizes admission to Wellesley as "most selective". For the Class of 2023 (enrolling fall 2019), the middle 50% range of SAT scores was 680–750 for evidence-based reading and 680–780 for math, while the middle 50% range for the ACT composite score was 31–34 for enrolled first-year students. For the incoming class of 2028, Wellesley received a record number of applications, totaling over 8,900 applications, and 13% of applicants were offered admission. During the 2023–2024 admissions cycle (enrolling Fall 2024), the college was test-optional and did not publish standardized testing statistics for the class of 2027 as of July 2024. The college is need-blind for domestic applicants.

==== Transgender applicants ====
In 2015, following years of student activism, the admissions policy of Wellesley College was updated in 2015 to allow transgender women and non-binary people assigned female at birth to be considered for admittance. On March 5, 2015, the college announced that any applicant who "lives as a woman and consistently identifies as a woman" would be considered for admission. The first transgender students at Wellesley enrolled in Fall 2017. In 2023, the majority of students voted to allow transgender men to enroll following a nonbinding student referendum.. The College's admissions policy remains that it is open to "any applicant who lives as a woman and consistently identifies as a woman".

==== Nontraditional age applicants ====
Wellesley began its program for non-traditional students in 1971 when the Continuing Education Program was launched. This program was renamed in 1991 for Elisabeth Kaiser Davis, a member of the Class of 1932. Wellesley allows applicants older than 24 who had begun but have not completed a bachelor's degree to apply to the Elizabeth Kaiser Davis Degree Program. Davis Scholars are fully integrated into the Wellesley community; they take the same classes as traditional students and can choose to live on campus. According to the Wellesley web site, Davis Scholars' "diverse backgrounds, experiences and perspectives enrich the lives of the whole student body."

=== Tuition and financial aid ===
For the 2024–2025 school year, Wellesley's annual tuition was $92,060 per year, the first tuition cost for a Boston-area school (along with Boston University) to exceed $90,000 annually. In 2020–2021, the average annual aid offer was over $56,000. The maximum loan level for other students on aid is $12,825 total for four years.

=== Rankings ===
Academic rankings

Liberal arts
- U.S. News & World Report: 7
- Washington Monthly: 20

National
- Forbes: 23
- WSJ/College Pulse: 31

In its 2025 rankings of national liberal arts colleges in the U.S., U.S. News & World Report ranked Wellesley seventh overall, first for women's colleges, 8th for "best value", tied at 23rd for "best undergraduate teaching", and 17th for "top performers on social mobility".

In 2024, Washington Monthly ranked Wellesley 20th among 194 liberal arts colleges in the U.S. based on its contribution to the public good, as measured by social mobility, research, and promoting public service.

In addition, Forbes' 2024–25 "America's Top Colleges" ranked the institution 23rd among the top 500 U.S. colleges, service academies and universities. Wellesley College is accredited by the New England Commission of Higher Education.

== Student life ==
Approximately 98% of students live on campus.

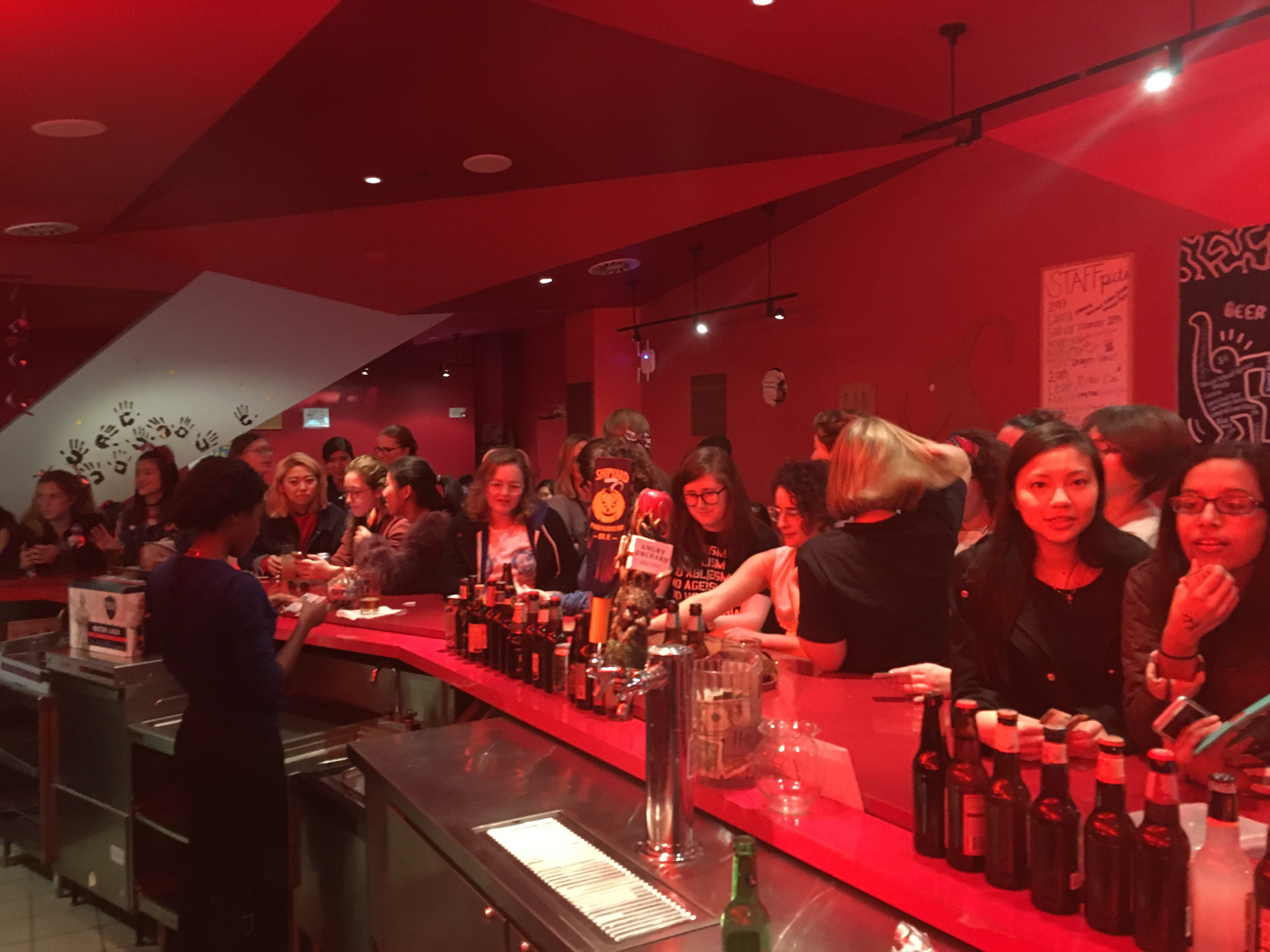
A behind-the-bar view of a busy night at Punch's Alley

For more than 50 years, Wellesley has offered a cross-registration program with MIT. Students can participate in research at MIT through the Undergraduate Research Opportunities Program (UROP). In recent years, cross-registration opportunities have expanded to include nearby Babson College, Brandeis University, and Olin College of Engineering. The college also has exchange programs with other small colleges, including Amherst, Connecticut College, Dartmouth, Mount Holyoke, Smith, Trinity, Vassar, Wesleyan, and Wheaton.

=== Organizations ===
The college has approximately 180 student organizations. WZLY is the college's campus radio station. It is entirely student-run and plays on 91.5 FM. Founded in 1942, it holds claim to be the oldest still-running women's college radio station in the country.

Publications on campus include Counterpoint, the monthly journal of campus life; The Wellesley News, the campus newspaper; International Relations Council Journal, the internationally oriented campus publication; The Wellesley Review, the literary magazine; GenerAsians: the Asian writing review, and W.Collective, the fashion and lifestyle magazine.

There are also several social organizations on campus, called "societies," which each have a unique academic focus. In order to join, students must attend "teas" where they can learn more about the focus of each society. Societies that are active on campus include the Shakespeare Society (theater), Society Zeta Alpha (literature), Tau Zeta Epsilon (arts and music), and Agora Society (politics).

=== Athletics ===
Wellesley athletics logo

Wellesley fields 13 varsity sports teams – basketball, crew, cross country, fencing, field hockey, golf, lacrosse, soccer, softball, swimming & diving, tennis, track & field, and volleyball. Wellesley does not have a mascot in the traditional sense – its sports teams are referred to both individually and collectively as "the Blue" (the school colors are royal blue and white). Wellesley is a member of the NCAA NCAA Division III and the Eastern Conference Athletic Conference (ECAC) and competes primarily as a member of the New England Women's and Men's Athletic Conference (NEWMAC).

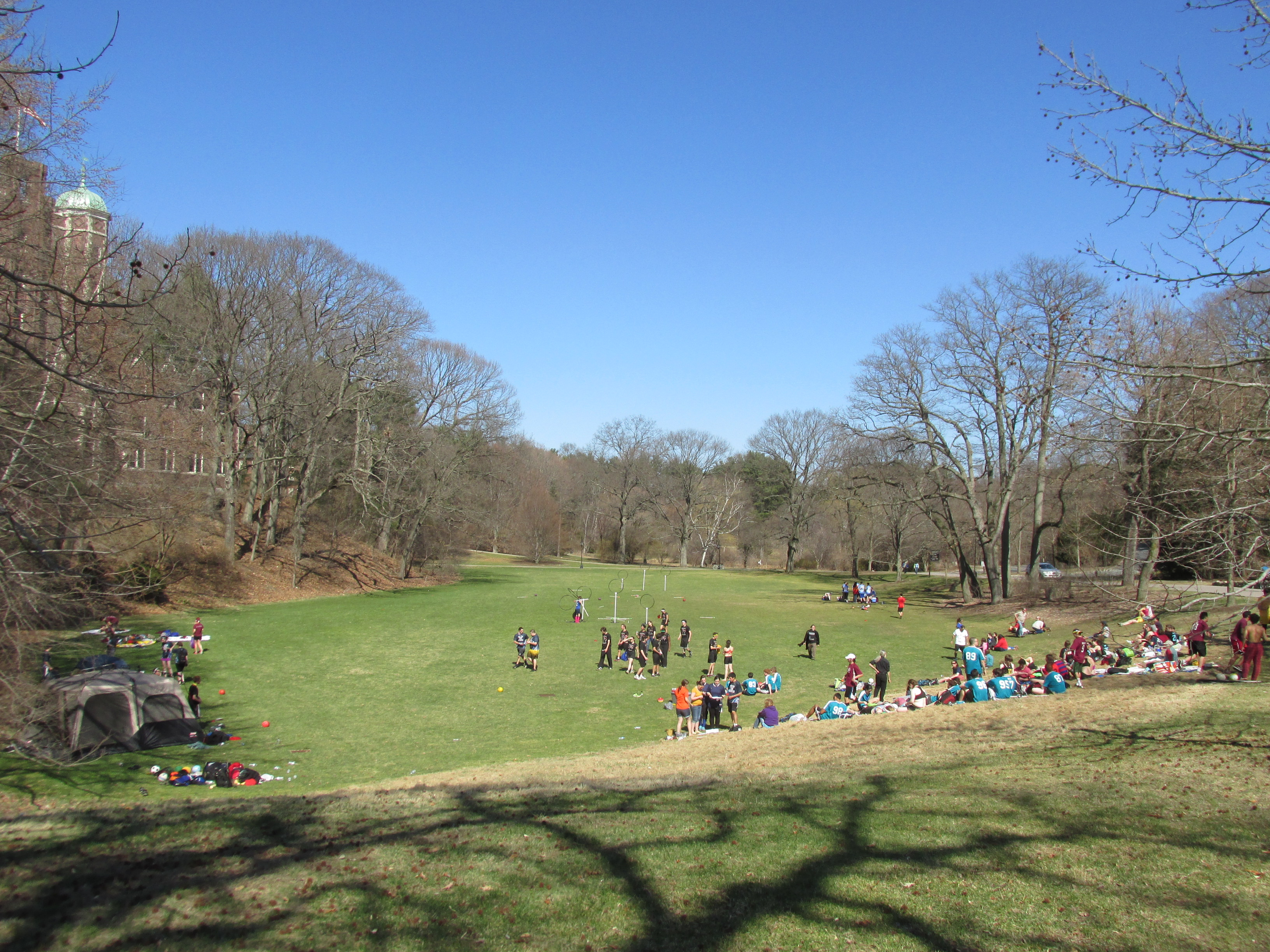
Preparations for a spring game of quidditch

The Wellesley College Crew Team, affectionately known as "Blue Crew", was founded in 1970 and was the first women's intercollegiate rowing team in the country. In 2016, Blue Crew won the NCAA Division III Rowing Championship as a team for the first time in Wellesley history, with its first Varsity 8+ boat placing first and second Varsity 8+ boat placing second. This historic win marked the first time a team from Wellesley College won a national championship and the first time a women's college won the NCAA Rowing Championships. In 2022, Blue Crew won the NCAA Division III Rowing Championship as a team for a second time, with both its first Varsity 8+ and second Varsity 8+ boats placing second.

In 2023, Blue Crew again won the NCAA Division III Rowing Championship as a team, with its first Varsity 8+ boat placing first and second Varsity 8+ boat placing second.

Wellesley also fields club teams in archery, alpine & Nordic skiing, equestrian, ice hockey, rugby, sailing, squash, Ultimate Frisbee, and water polo. Squash was originally a varsity sport but was downgraded to a club sport status in 2017 when the college left the proper division. Recently, ultimate frisbee competed at nationals and ranked 2nd (2022) and 7th (2024).

From 1943 to 1946, Judy Atterbury won multiple national intercollegiate women's tennis championships in both singles (1943, 1946) and doubles (1943, 1944). Nadine Netter won the Eastern Women's College Tournament in 1962, and was the Eastern Intercollegiate Champion and New England Intercollegiate women's Tennis Championship winner in 1965.

==== Crew ====
In both 2016 and 2023, Wellesley College's first Varsity 8+ boat became a national champion in its event at the NCAA Rowing Championships. Wellesley College Crew Team's head coach, Tessa Spillane, was voted the NCAA Division III Rowing Coach of the Year in 2010–11, 2015–16, and 2021–22. Additionally, Wellesley College Crew Team's coaching staff received the 2015–16 and 2021–22 CRCA NCAA Division III National Coaching Staff of the Year awards.

=== Traditions ===
Hoop Rolling

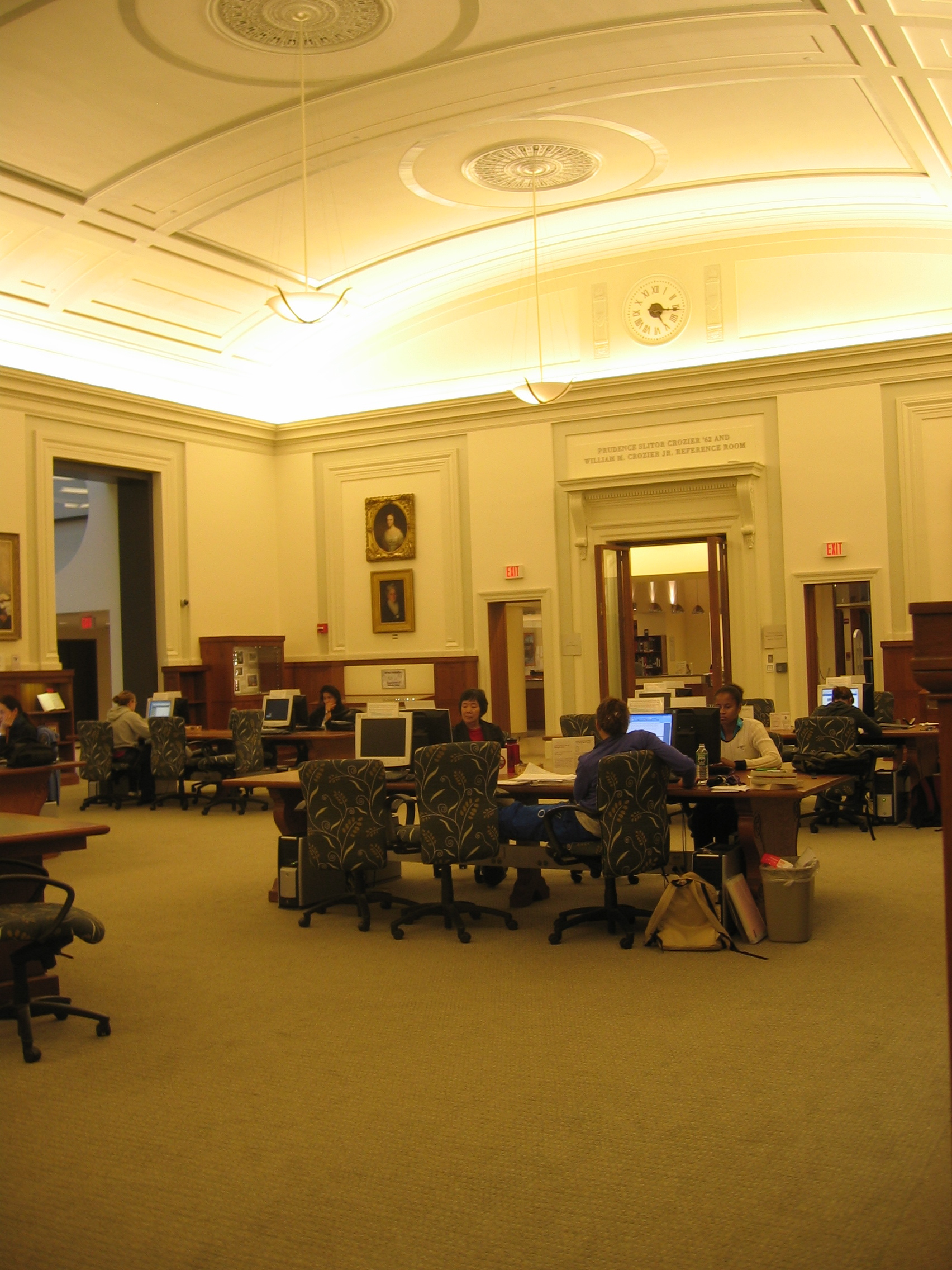
Wellesley College Library

Hoop rolling is an annual tradition at the college that dates to 1895. Before graduation, seniors, wearing their graduation robes, run a short race while rolling a wooden hoop, often passed down to them from their "big" sibling. The winner is picked up and carried by their classmates and thrown into Lake Waban.

In the early 20th century, the winner of hoop rolling was said to be the first in her class to marry. This changed in the 1980s, and the winner was said to become the class's first CEO. Since the 1990 commencement speech by then-First Lady Barbara Bush, the winner has been said to be the first to achieve success, however they define it.

Marathon Monday

The Wellesley College campus sits just before the halfway mark of the Boston Marathon course, and students have been cheering on its runners every year since the first running of the marathon. Holding signs and cheering loudly, the crowd of students at Wellesley has become known as the "Scream Tunnel."

In 1966, word got out that a woman was running in the marathon, and students turned out in huge numbers in cheer her on. Once women were officially allowed to register for race (1972), the campus tradition became even more popular.

Because Marathon Monday, known as "MarMon" on campus, occurs on Patriots Day, students have no classes and the campus celebrates both the runners and a day off in jolly fashion.

== Alumnae and faculty ==
=== Alumnae ===
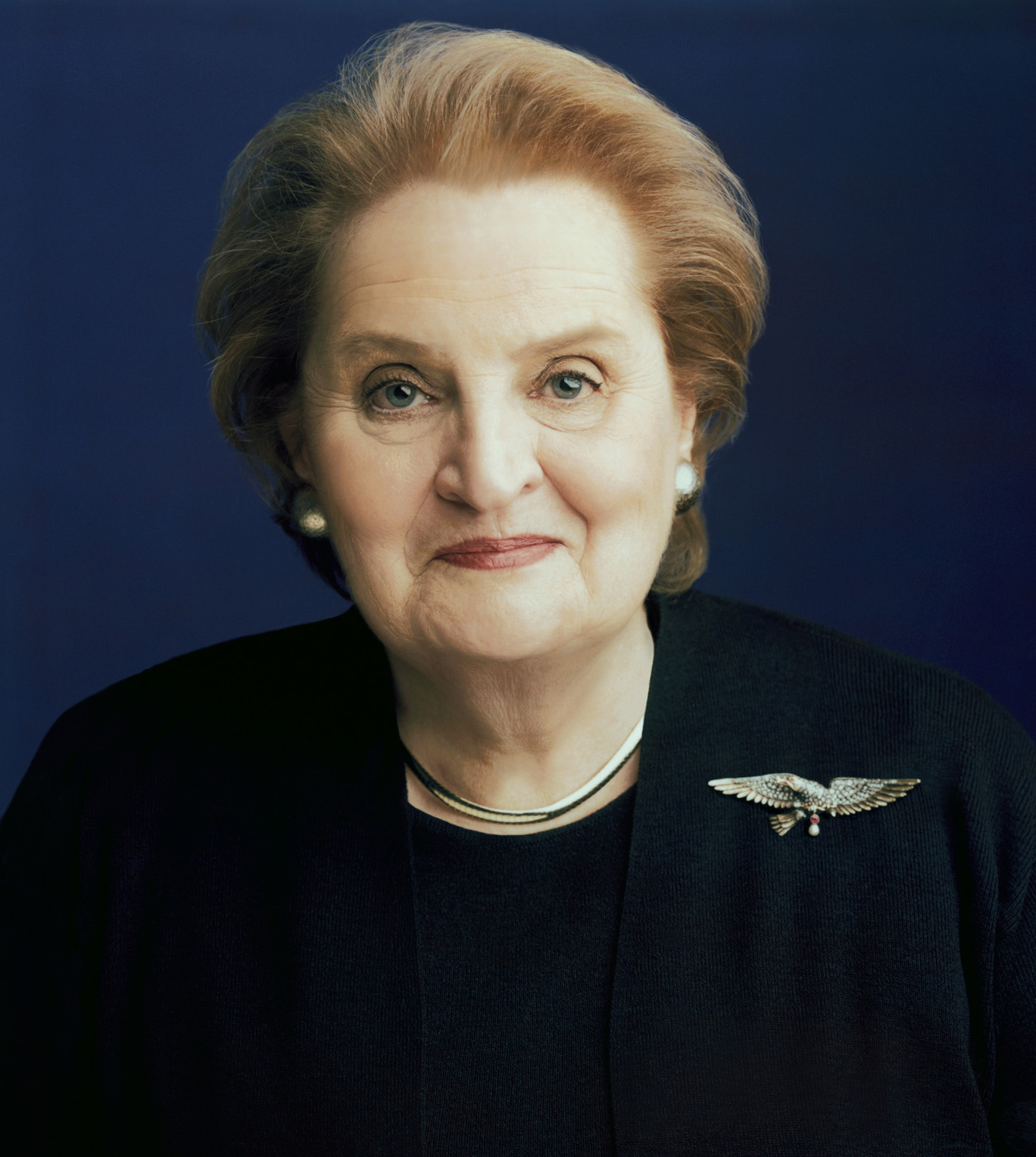
Madeleine Albright

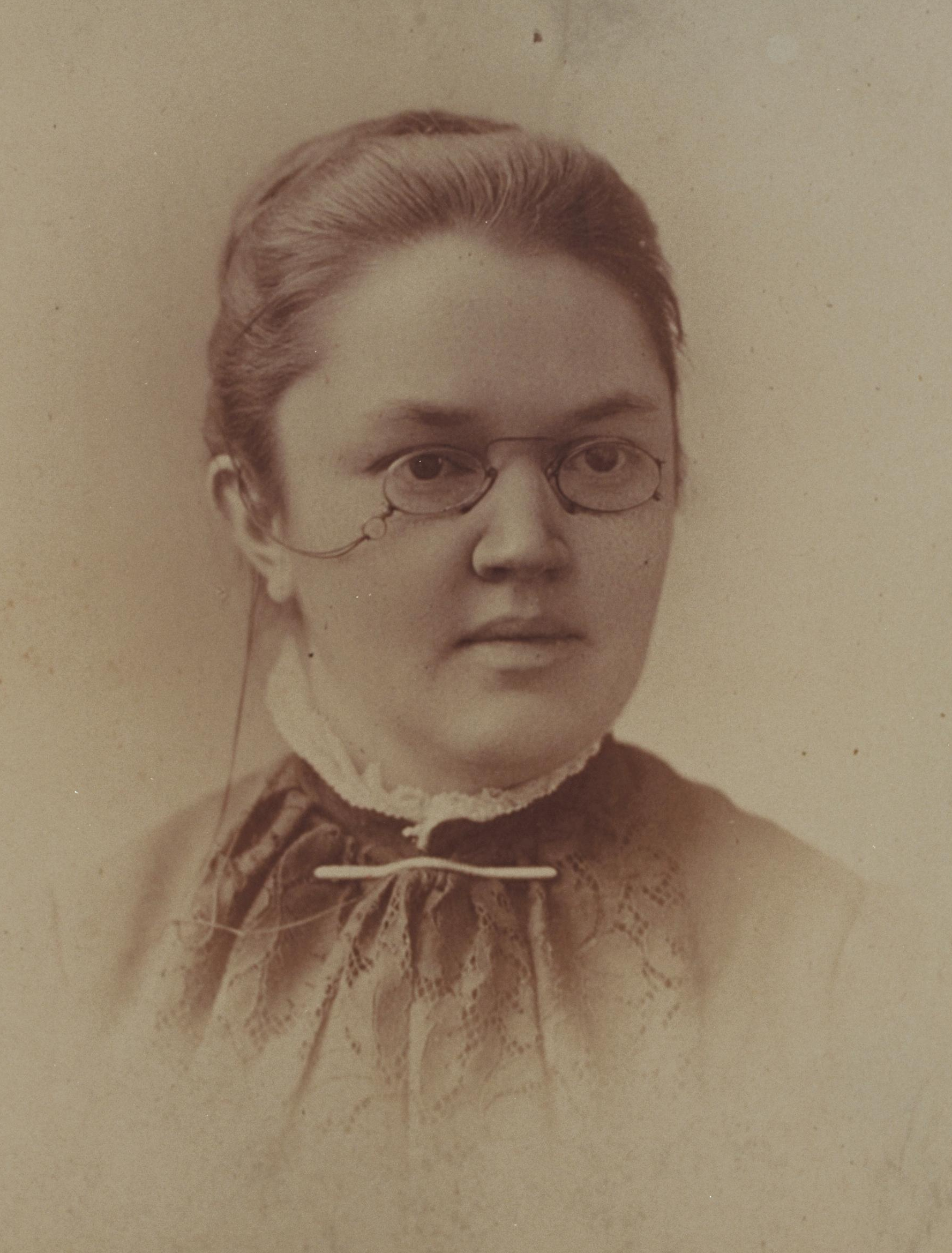
Katharine Lee Bates

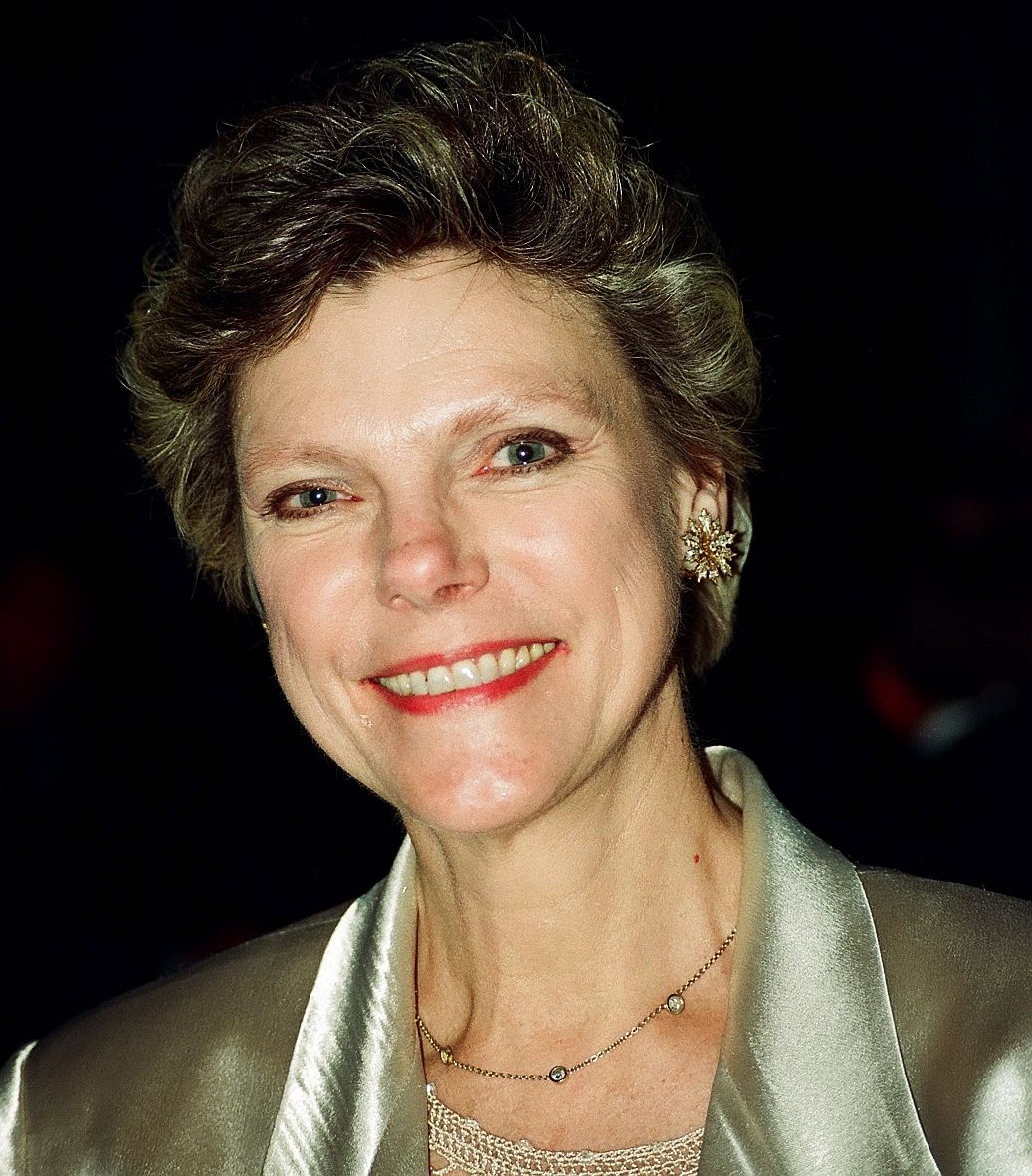
Cokie Roberts

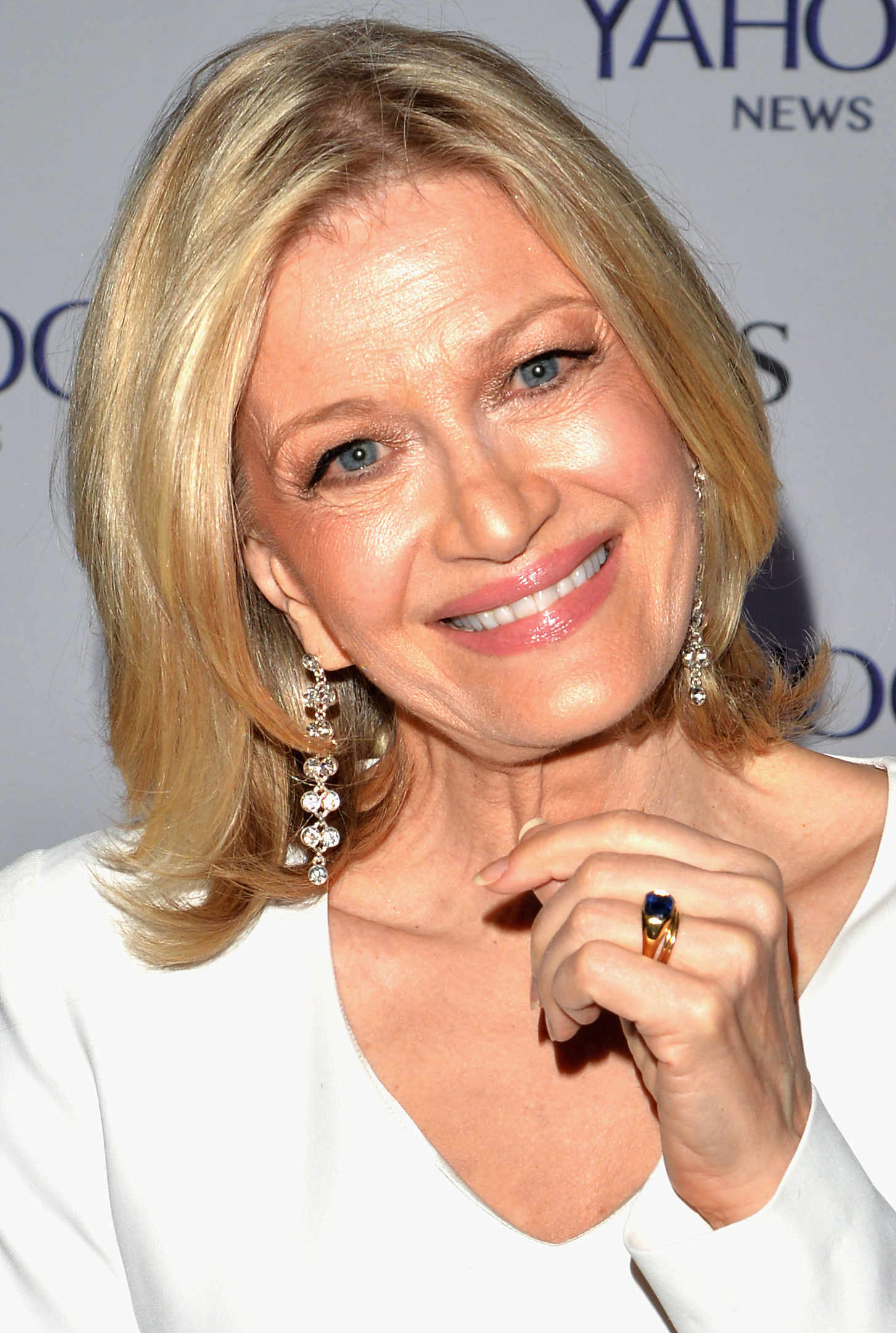
Diane Sawyer

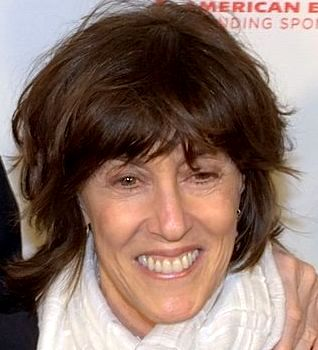
Nora Ephron

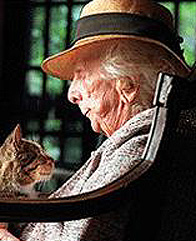
Marjory Stoneman Douglas

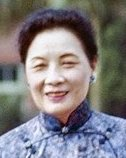
Soong Mei-ling

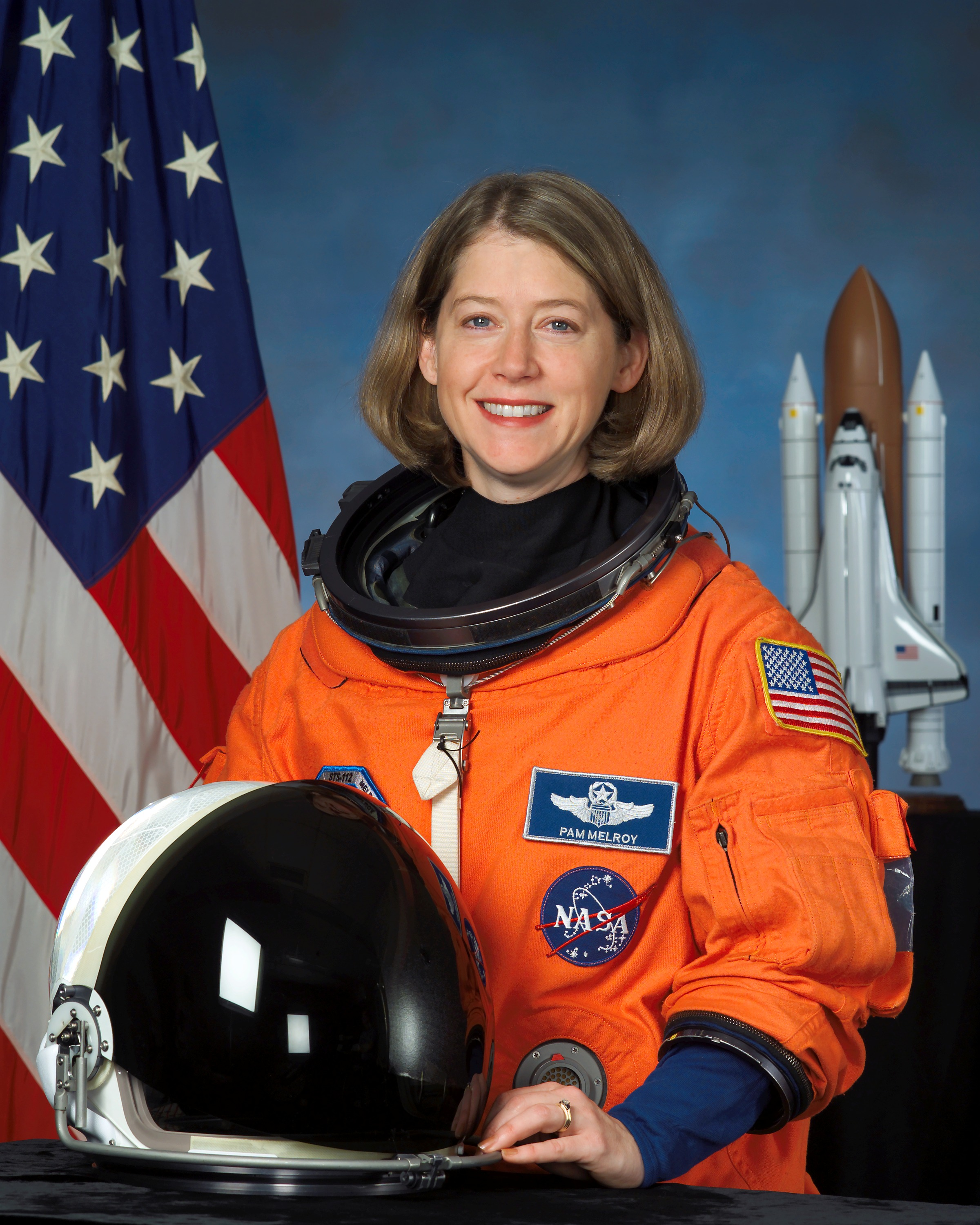
Pamela Melroy

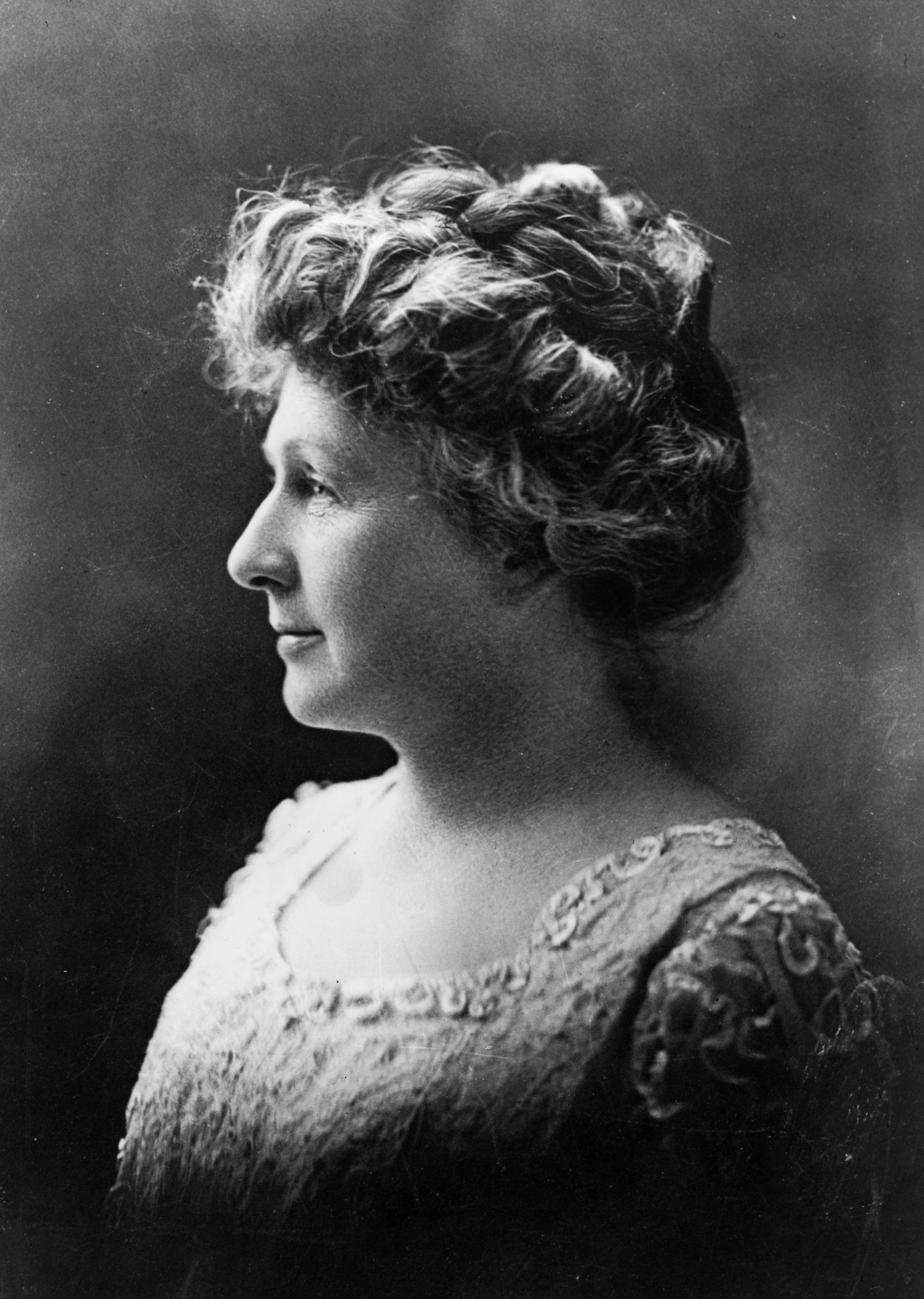
Annie Jump Cannon

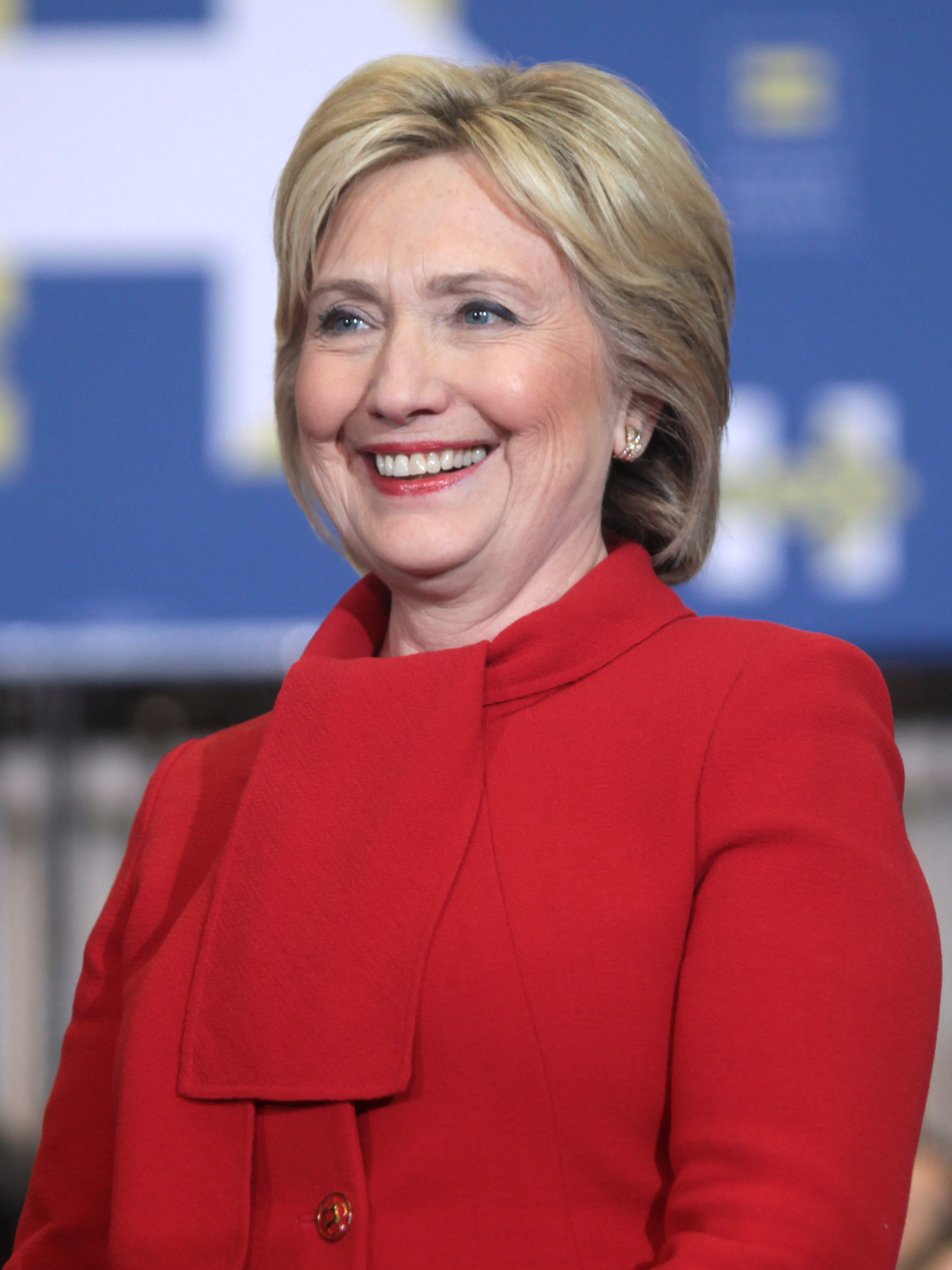
Hillary Clinton

Wellesley alumnae achieve excellence in a wide range of fields, including business, government, public service, and the arts.

Both Madeleine Albright ('59), and Hillary Rodham Clinton ('69), have spoken about the formative impact their Wellesley experiences had on their careers. During her life, Secretary Albright returned annually to campus to lead the Madeleine Korbel Albright Institute for Global Affairs, a month-long pedagogical seminar where students learn more about global affairs through analysis and action. Three US ambassadors (Julieta Valls Noyes, Anne Patterson, and Michele Sison) are Wellesley alumnae. Soong Mei-ling, former First Lady of the Republic of China, was also a graduate of Wellesley College.

Wellesley alumnae include the first woman to be named professor of clinical medicine Connie Guion, class of 1906; architect Ann Beha, class of 1972; author Harriet Stratemeyer Adams (author and publisher) class of 1914; Bertha Isabelle Barker graduated with a bachelor of science in 1892 and became resident fellow and scholar in bacteriology at the Rockefeller Institute; Astronomer Annie Jump Cannon, class of 1884; archaeologist Josephine Platner Shear, class of 1924; astronaut Pamela Melroy class of 1983; screenwriter Nora Ephron, class of 1962; composers Elizabeth Bell and Natalie Sleeth; and professor and songwriter Katharine Lee Bates. Journalists Callie Crossley, Diane Sawyer, Cokie Roberts, Lynn Sherr, and Michele Caruso-Cabrera also graduated from Wellesley as did Amalya Lyle Kearse, Judge on the United States Court of Appeals for the Second Circuit, Sandra Lynch, United States Circuit Judge of the United States Court of Appeals for the First Circuit, and political scientist Jane Mansbridge, class of 1961. Rebecca Lancefield, a member of the National Academy of Sciences, graduated from Wellesley, as did Alice Ames Winter (B.A. 1886; M.A. 1889), president of the General Federation of Women's Clubs. Adaline Emerson Thompson, class of 1880, later served as a trustee for twenty years.

Additional alumnae include Ali MacGraw '60, American actor; and Jasmine Guillory '97, American New York Times best-selling author.

Wellesley graduates who have received the college's Alumnae Achievement Award include: Anna Medora Baetjer, class of 1920, public health expert, physiologist, toxicologist; Marian Burros '54, journalist, food writer; Sally Carrighar, class of 1922, writer, naturalist; Elyse Cherry '75, an entrepreneur, financial, and social equity activist; Suzanne Ciani '68, electronic music composer, recording artist; Phyllis Curtin '43, opera singer; Jocelyn Gill '38, astronomer; Marjory Stoneman Douglas, class of 1912, environmental activist, author; Persis Drell '77, particle physicist; Nora Ephron '62, writer and director; Helen Hays '53, ornithologist; Dorothea Jameson '42, psychologist; Jean Kilbourne '64, media educator; Judith Martin '59, (pen name Miss Manners) author; Nergis Mavalvala '90, a quantum astrophysicist; Nayantara Sahgal '47, an Indian writer; Lorraine O'Grady '55, conceptual artist and cultural critic; Santha Rama Rau '45, writer; Marilyn Yalom '54, historian, feminist scholar; and Patricia Zipprodt '46, costume designer.

Jocelyn Benson, Governor-elect, Michigan, 2026.

=== Faculty ===
Former and current Wellesley faculty include:

- Leah B. Allen, astronomer
- Myrtilla Avery, art historian and one of the Monuments Men
- Emily Green Balch, economist and peace activist
- Katharine Lee Bates, poet, novelist, essayist
- Frank Bidart, poet, winner of the Pulitzer Prize for Poetry
- Karl E. Case, economist
- Dan Chiasson, poet and writer
- Margaret Clapp, author
- Katharine Coman, economic historian
- Rose Laub Coser, sociologist
- Alona E. Evans, political scientist
- Alice T. Friedman, architectural historian
- Jorge Guillén, poet and literary critic
- Charlotte Houtermans, physicist
- Grace E. Howard, botanist
- Elizabeth Ellis Hoyt, economist
- Jonathan B. Knudsen, historian
- Frances Lowater, physicist and astronomer
- Paul K. MacDonald, political scientist
- Mary Kate McGowan, philosopher of language
- Peggy McIntosh, women's studies scholar
- Vladimir Nabokov, novelist
- Adrian Piper, philosopher and visual and conceptual artist
- Ruth Anna Putnam, philosopher and world-renowned expert in American pragmatism
- Marietta Sherman Raymond, violinist, music educator, orchestral conductor
- Susan Mokotoff Reverby, gender studies scholar
- Alan Schechter, political scientist
- Vida Dutton Scudder, English professor
- Helen L. Webster, philologist and educator
- Sarah Frances Whiting, physicist and astronomer
- Richard Wilbur, former United States Poet Laureate
- Delaphine Grace Wyckoff, botany and bacteriology

== See also ==
- Wellesley College Botanic Gardens
- Wellesley College Tupelos
- Women's colleges in the United States
- List of coordinate colleges
- Boston marriage § Wellesley marriage
- Mona Lisa Smile, a fictional film about Wellesley in the 1950s
