= McLean House =

McLean House may refer to:

in the United States

(by state then city or town)

- McLean House (Little Rock, Arkansas), listed on the National Register of Historic Places (NRHP) in Little Rock
- Maclean House, University of Chicago residential hall named for Norman Maclean, Chicago, Illinois
- Isaac McLean House, Cambridge, Massachusetts, NRHP-listed
- John S. McLean House, listed on the NRHP in Iron County
- Thomas McLean House, Battenville, New York, NRHP-listed
- Henry McLean House, Fayetteville, North Carolina, listed on the NRHP in Cumberland County
- Dr. Joseph A. McLean House, Sedalia, North Carolina, listed on the NRHP in Guilford County
- B. W. McLean House and Office, Jenks, Oklahoma, listed on the NRHP in Tulsa County
- Robert and Lucy McLean House, Grants Pass, Oregon, listed on the NRHP in Josephine County
- McLean House (Appomattox, Virginia), a historic house within Appomattox Court House National Historical Park
