= Ada Howard =

First president of Wellesley College

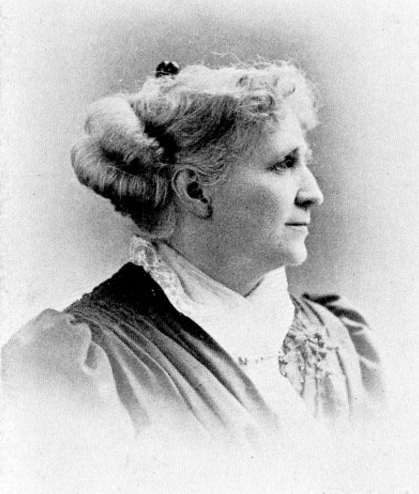
- First President of Wellesley
- Born: December 19, 1829; Temple, New Hampshire
- Died: March 3, 1907 (aged 77); New York City
- Resting place: Wellesley Cemetery
- Education: Mount Holyoke College
- Title: President of Wellesley College
- Term: 1875-1881
- Successor: Alice Freeman Palmer
- Parents: Lydia Adaline Cowden; William Hawkins Howard

Ada Lydia Howard (December 19, 1829 – March 3, 1907) was the first president of Wellesley College.

She received a postgraduate education under private teachers and went on to teach at Western College, Ohio, from 1861 to 1862. She was also the principal of the Female Seminary at Knox College, Illinois, from 1866 to 1869. In 1870, she became headmistress of Ivy Hall Seminary, a private school in Bridgeton, New Jersey, that had been founded in 1861. In 1875 she was chosen by founder Henry Fowle Durant to become the first president of Wellesley College, Massachusetts. This promotion made Howard the first woman president of a college in the world. Here she worked in full harmony with Mr. and Mrs. Durant and her labors in furthering the plans of the founders were unremitting up to the time of the death of Mr. Durant in 1881. In that year, her failure in health demanded immediate and complete rest, and the trustees gave her leave of absence, but finding herself unable to resume her duties, she resigned in 1882. In appreciation of her work at Wellesley, the alumnae, in 1890, placed in the art gallery a life-size portrait of their first president, and a scholarship was established in her honor, known as the Ada L. Howard scholarship. Her subsequent life was passed in rest and travel, as her continued ill-health called for frequent change of climate. She was obliged to restrict her literary work to occasional articles for leading magazines. She received from Mount Holyoke college the honorary degree of Litt.D. in 1900. She died on Sunday, March 3, 1907.

== Early life and education ==
Ada Lydia Howard was born in Temple, New Hampshire, on December 19, 1829. She was the daughter of Lydia Adaline Cowden and William Hawkins Howard. Her father was a teacher, scholar, and scientific agriculturalist. Three of her great-grandfathers were officers during the Revolutionary War. She was the granddaughter of Col. William and Mary (Hawkins) Howard; great-granddaughter of Samuel and Elizabeth (Barrett) Howard, and of Thomas Cowden, Esq., the most prominent founder of Fitchburg, Mass. Her ancestry was English and Scotch.

She was taught by her father and at New Ipswich Academy and Lowell High School. Howard graduated from Mount Holyoke College (then Mount Holyoke Female Seminary) in 1853 and then continued her studies with private teachers.

== Career ==
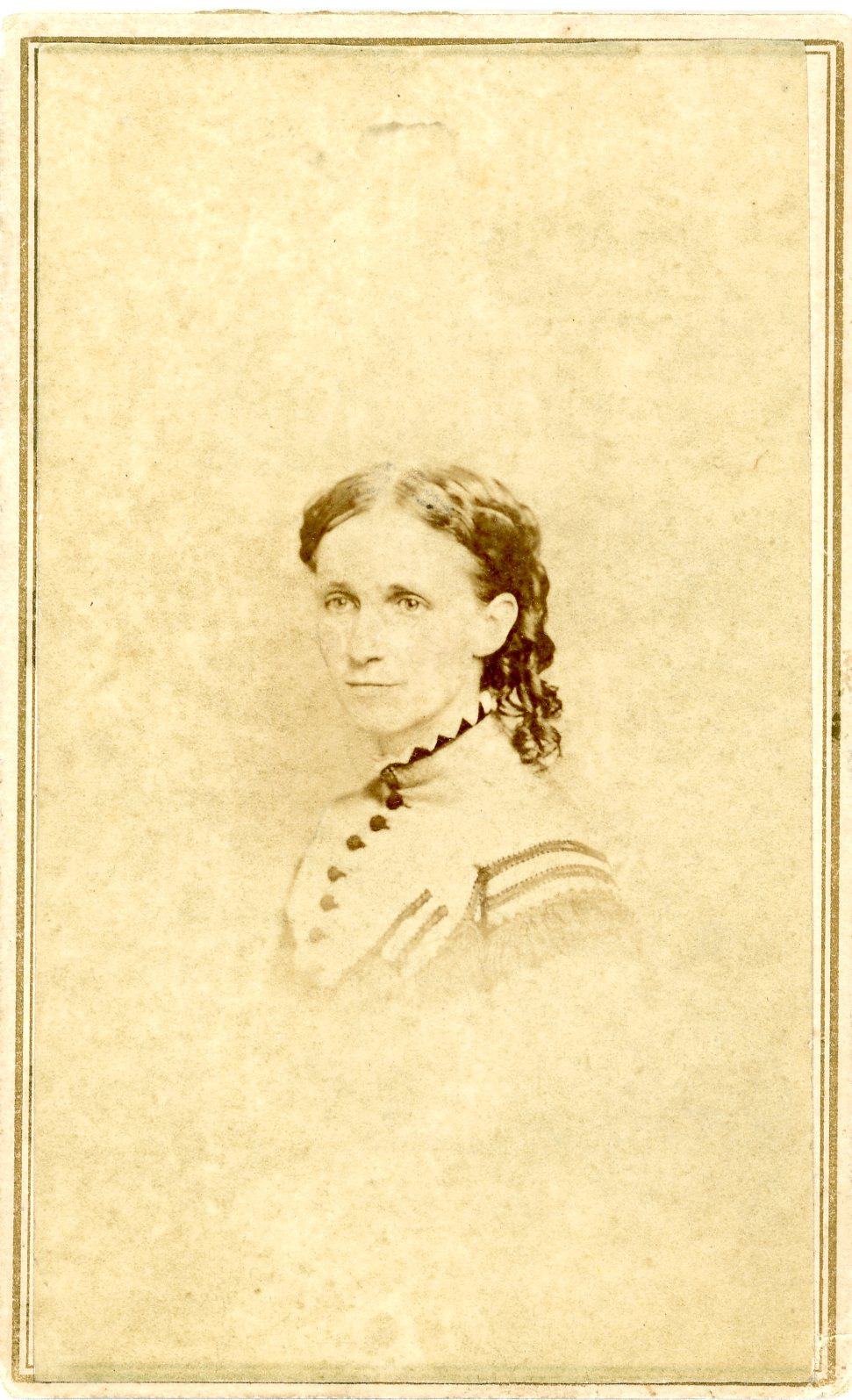
Portrait taken when she was principal of the Knox Female Seminary. (1866–1869)

After graduation, Howard taught at her alma mater for three years before she moved to Ohio, where she taught at Western College. In Illinois, she worked for Knox College as the principal of the Woman's Department and a faculty member, teaching Moral Philosophy, Rhetoric, and Literary Criticism. In 1866, when she taught at the college, there were separate classrooms and curriculums for men and women. She felt that women should have the same opportunities for education as men.

=== Student Strike at Knox College ===
After becoming principal of the women's seminary in 1867, Howard was overworked and unable to influence President William Curtis to create an equal co-educational program or even to make the salaries for the women seminary teachers equal to those of the college professors. She, and two other professors, Louise A. Sanderson and Mary J. Farnham, resigned in 1868 after Curtis grabbed her during an argument about the next year's course catalog. James Parks, a Knox freshman at the time, reports that the next day, a Saturday, students rang the bell in Old Main, the oldest building on the Knox campus, for a long time. They had cut the bell rope and also taken Civil War muskets and ammunition up into the bell tower so that they could make noise in protest of Curtis’ conduct. Parks reports that little happened on Sunday. On Monday, when students assembled near the college chapel in the morning, they refused to enter until Curtis resigned. Parks writes that only three students went to chapel services that day. A historian at Knox College reports that six students went to services, but otherwise corroborates Park's description of the strike.

During Tuesday, students repeated this technique which Parks later began to call the first ‘sit-down strike’ which he knew of. Before the 3 pm recitation in the chapel that day, the trustees met. The president of the Knox board of trustees, Illinois Supreme Court Chief Justice Lawrence, then informed the students that Curtis had resigned. The students went to the chapel for the recitation, “yelling ‘Hurrah for Knox College!’ or words to that effect.” Other sources provide additional details to the historical event. According to the College Courier, a Monmouth College newspaper, students even surrounded the president’s residence throwing hisses and complaints before parading the campus the next day armed with weapons. The Seminary female students joined in the commotion with piano and organs. After an unfruitful attempt to halt the noises, Curtis made his way to the Seminary and inquired for Howard to offer an apology, to which she refused. After Curtis’ resignation, Howard's position was reinstated. She also was made professor of literary criticism, rhetoric, and moral philosophy. During the June 1868 trustees’ meeting, a committee was created which was allowed to raise her salary. The next college president, Reverend John P. Gulliver promised to offer more opportunities for women, and in 1871 women were granted access to the college, and could take courses along with their male classmates. Women were able to get degrees rather than just Seminary Certificates. In 1891 Knox College became entirely co-ed.

=== 1870s ===
Before Western College, Howard returned to Mount Holyoke as a professor and then taught at Oxford Female Institute. She moved to New Jersey, where she ran a school for girls, Ivy Hall, in Bridgeton.

She was president of Wellesley beginning in 1875. The founder, Henry Fowle Durant, was very involved in the administration and decision-making of the college. In placing a woman at its head and conferring upon her the full powers of president of a corporate college, Durant was enthusiastic in his confidence and said: "I have been for four years looking for a president. She will be a target to be shot at and for the present the position will be one of severe trials. I have for some time been closely investigating Miss Howard. I look upon her as appointed for this work not by the trustees, but by God, for whom the college was built."

She followed his lead, but his insistence that staff be of the evangelical Christian faith made hiring staff difficult. There was a division in the college between faculty members hired by Durant that supported his position and other staff members who did not support Durant's nearly fanatical beliefs. Conflict at the college escalated at the same time that Durant and Howard's health declined. Durant stopped coming to the campus. Apart from this, her leadership at Wellesley College remained undocumented in their library except for an obituary with a statement that she was the first president. Durant died in 1881 and Howard resigned shortly after taking leave for health reasons. She then lived in New York City, where she died in 1907.

== Death ==
She died on Sunday, March 3, 1907, and her funeral took place in the Houghton Memorial Chapel, located on the Wellesley College campus, on Wednesday, March 7. All classes and academic appointments were suspended for the day. Students formed two lines at the front of the chapel as the funeral procession advanced. Dr. William F. Warren of Boston University, a senior member of Wellesley's board of trustees, and Reverend Mr. Ollphant of Methuen Mass, pastor of the church Ada Howard attended, led the services. At the end of the service, students led the funeral procession to the Wellesley Cemetery where Ada Howard was laid to rest.
