= Dana-Palmer House =

Historic house in Massachusetts, United States

- U.S. National Register of Historic Places
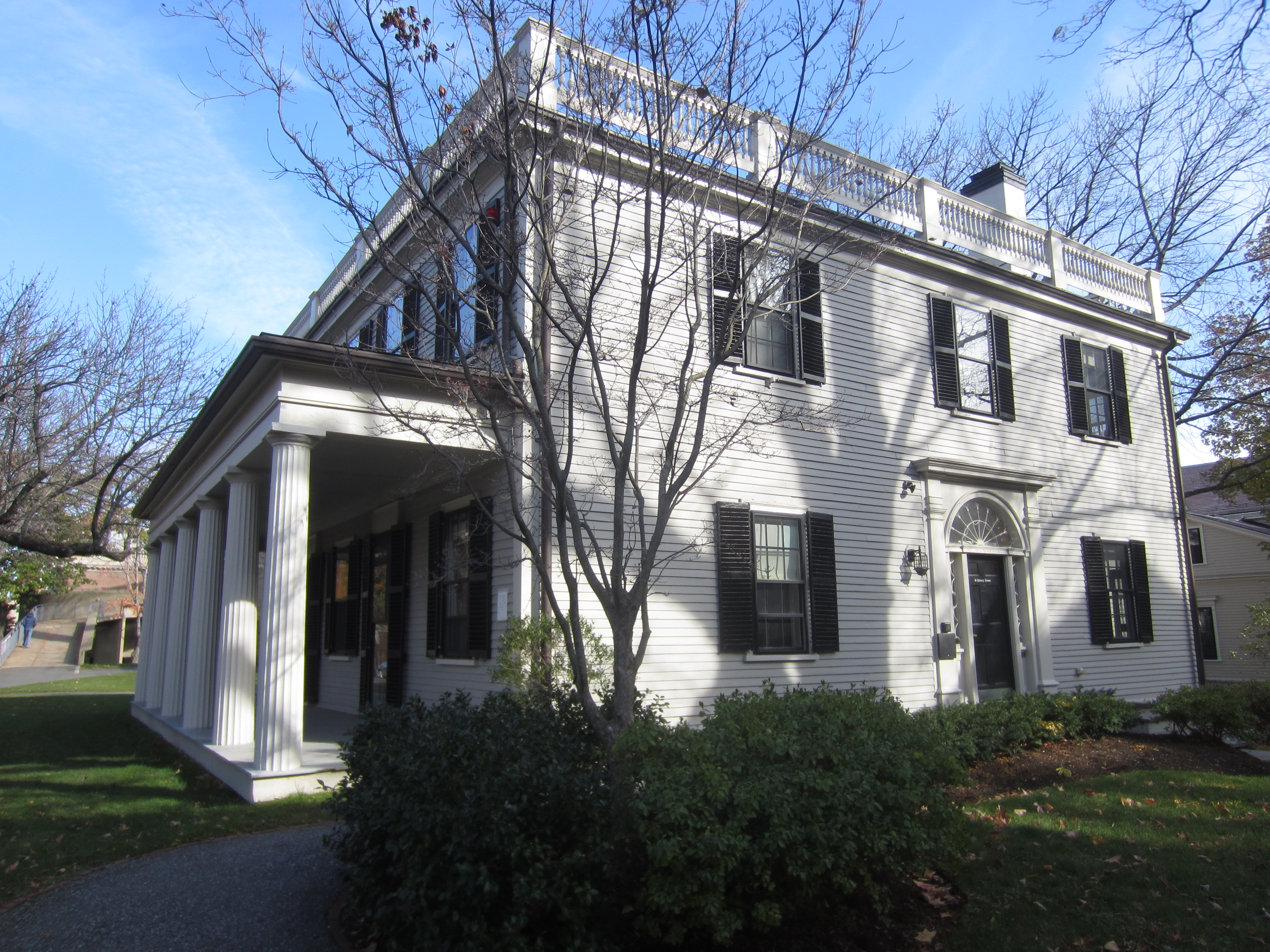

- Location within Massachusetts Location within the United States
- Location: 12–16 Quincy Street, Cambridge, Massachusetts
- Coordinates: 42°22′22.8″N 71°6′52.8″W
- Built: 1822
- Architectural style: Greek Revival, Federal
- MPS: Cambridge MRA
- NRHP reference No.: 86001682
- Added to NRHP: May 19, 1986

The Dana-Palmer House (also known as Dana-Peabody House) is an historic house in Cambridge, Massachusetts. The two-story wood-frame house was built in 1823, and is basically Federal in its styling, although it has a Greek Revival porch. From 1835 to 1842 the building served as Harvard's astronomical observatory; from 1842 to 1947 as a faculty residence for several notable faculty; from 1947 to 2006 as an official visitor guest house; and after 2006 as home of Harvard's department of comparative literature.

== History ==
The house was built in 1823 on land belonging to the Dana family, and was occupied by Richard Henry Dana Sr. among others, until its acquisition by Harvard University in 1835.

=== Observatory ===
The building was quickly converted into an observatory in anticipation of the 1835 arrival of Halley's Comet. From 1835 to 1842 the building served as Harvard's first astronomical observatory, as well as a residence for William Cranch Bond, the observatory's director. A transit mechanism was installed in the main room, and the roof held a turret on wheels for the telescope. In 1843 the observatory moved to Sears Tower, and the Dana-Palmer house was used as a faculty residence.

=== Residence and guest house ===
Cornelius Conway Felton lived there starting 1842. William James came up with his concept of "the Pluralistic Universe" after moving into the house in 1881. George Herbert Palmer lived in the house from 1884 to 1933, the longest of anyone. During Palmer's tenure, the house was remodeled and the turret removed. Other residents include Andrew Preston Peabody, Plummer Professor of Christian Morals.

In 1946, Harvard announced plans to demolish the house and replace it with Lamont Library, sparking alumni outrage and protest. Donor Thomas W. Lamont '92 provided funds for the house to be moved; the house was moved to its present location across Quincy Street in 1947. After this move, the house served as Harvard's official guest house for visitors.

The house was listed on the National Register of Historic Places in 1986.

=== Comparative Literature ===
Since 2006, Dana-Palmer House has been home to Harvard's department of comparative literature.

== See also ==
- National Register of Historic Places listings in Cambridge, Massachusetts
