= Palmer Memorial Institute =

Historic school building in North Carolina, United States

- Palmer Memorial Institute Historic District
- U.S. National Register of Historic Places
- U.S. Historic district
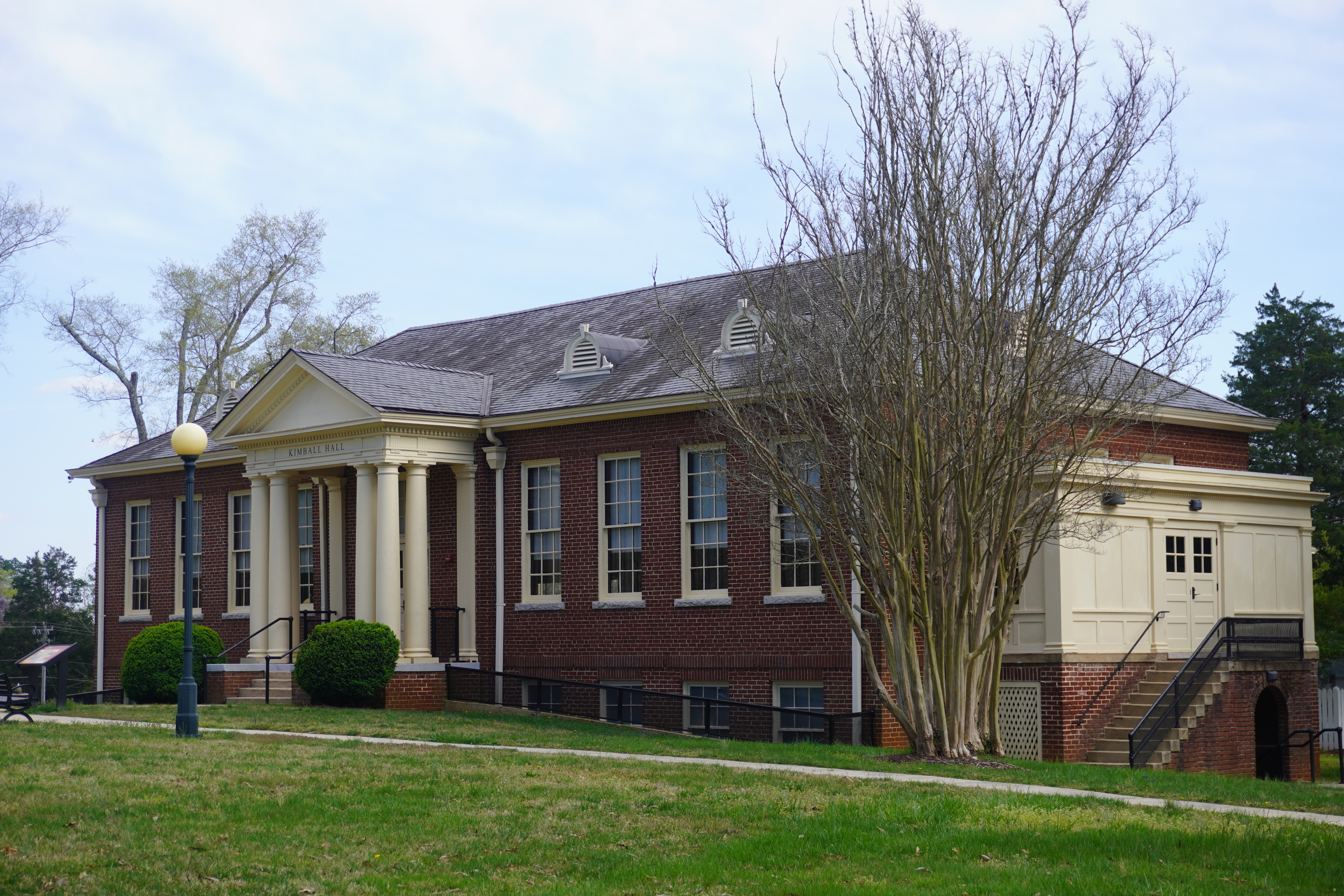
- Kimball Hall as stands at the renovated Charlotte Hawkins Brown Memorial, formerly the Palmer Institute.

- Location within North Carolina Location within the United States
- Location: Along US 70 W of jct. with NC 3056, Sedalia, North Carolina
- Coordinates: 36°4′2″N 79°37′25″W
- Built: 1901
- Architect: Barton, Harry; Hartmann, Charles C.
- Architectural style: Colonial Revival, Bungalow/Craftsman, I-house
- NRHP reference No.: 88002029
- Added to NRHP: October 24, 1988

The Alice Freeman Palmer Memorial Institute, better known as Palmer Memorial Institute, was a school for upper-class African Americans. It was founded in 1902 by Dr. Charlotte Hawkins Brown at Sedalia, North Carolina near Greensboro. The institute was named after Alice Freeman Palmer, former president of Wellesley College and benefactor of Dr. Brown.

It became, before its closure in the 1970s, a fully accredited, nationally recognized preparatory school. More than 1,000 African American students attended the school between 1902 and 1970.

Bennett College purchased the Palmer campus, but in 1980 it sold 40 acres (160,000 m^{2}) of the main campus with major surviving buildings to the American Muslim Mission. The Muslims, who belong to the community which followed, Imam Warith Deen Mohammed; tried to establish a teacher's college but abandoned this project due to the bad condition of the campus.

In late 1982, Maria Cole, a niece of Dr. Brown's and widow of late singer Nat King Cole, and friend Marie Gibbs of Greensboro began an effort to obtain recognition of Dr. Brown's social and educational contributions, specifically in regard to Palmer Memorial Institute. Both women, who were former students at Palmer Memorial Institute, sponsored meetings of Palmer alumni and enlisted support for this cause. They also met with North Carolina's Division of Archives and History to explore ideas.

Through the assistance of North Carolina Senator Bill Martin, a special bill was passed in the 1983 General Assembly that allowed for planning by Archives and History of the state's first African American state historic site as a memorial to Dr. Brown.

In November 1987, the memorial officially opened as a state historic site.

In 1994, the Historic Sites Section completed exhaustive, comprehensive research on Brown and the Palmer Institute, and restored or stabilized several other structures.

The Palmer Memorial Institute Historic District was listed on the National Register of Historic Places in 1988. The district encompasses 16 contributing buildings, 2 contributing sites, 3 contributing structures, and 2 contributing objects. They include the Queen Anne style Galen Stone Hall designed by Harry Barton (1876-1937), Charles W. Eliot Hall, and Kimball Hall; Alice Freeman Palmer Building (1922); Congregational Women's Cottage and Carrie M. Stone Cottage designed by Charles C. Hartmann; Rev. John Brice House (c. 1926); Bethany United Church of Christ (1870, c. 1925, c. 1975); and Robert B. Andrew Farm and Store/Post Office.

== Charlotte Hawkins Brown Museum ==
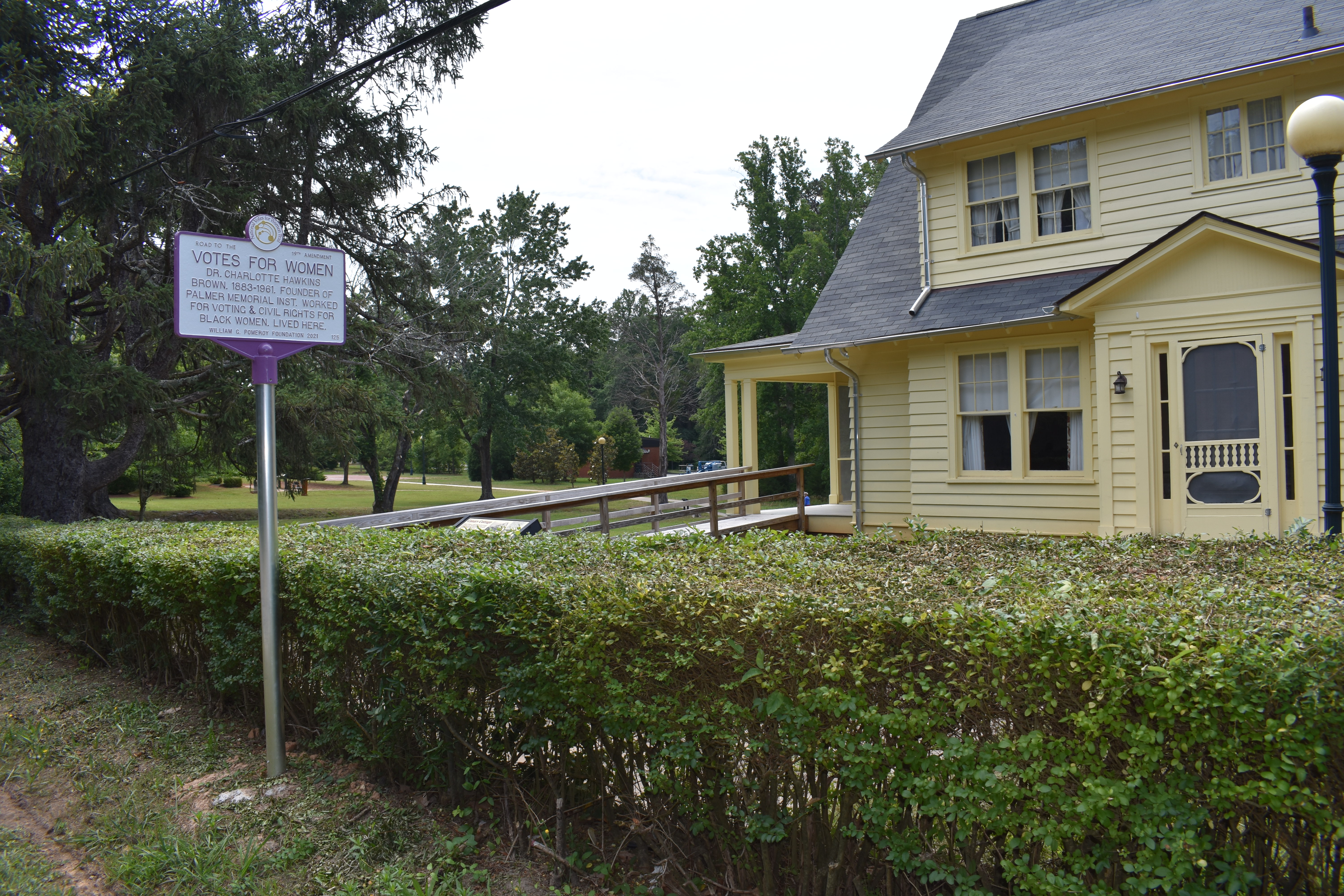
"Canary Cottage," a.k.a. the Charlotte Hawkins Brown Museum.

The restored campus buildings of the Palmer Memorial Institute are now the Charlotte Hawkins Brown Museum, which belongs to the North Carolina Department of Natural and Cultural Resources and links Dr. Brown and Palmer Memorial Institute to the larger themes of African American women, education, and social history, with an emphasis on the contributions made by African American citizens to education in North Carolina.

The museum's visitor center is located in the Carrie M. Stone Teachers' Cottage (1948), and features exhibits about Dr. Charlotte Hawkins Brown, the Institute and African American education in North Carolina. Visitors can tour Dr. Brown's residence, known as Canary Cottage, which has been furnished to reflect the 1930s and 1940s, when the school was at its peak. Several dormitories, the dining hall, bell tower, teahouse and several teachers' cottage can also be seen.

== Notable people ==
=== Alumni ===
- Maria Cole, jazz singer
- Liz Williamson, dancer, dance teacher, and choreographer

=== Faculty ===
- Wilhelmina Marguerita Crosson, school president from 1952 to 1966
