= German submarine U-177 =

German World War II submarine

History

Nazi Germany
- Name: U-177
- Ordered: 28 May 1940
- Builder: DeSchiMAG AG Weser, Bremen
- Yard number: 1017
- Laid down: 25 November 1940
- Launched: 1 October 1941
- Commissioned: 14 March 1942
- Fate: Sunk by US aircraft, 6 February 1944

General characteristics
- Class & type: Type IXD2 submarine
- Displacement: 1,610 t (1,580 long tons) surfaced; 1,799 t (1,771 long tons) submerged
- Length: 87.58 m (287 ft 4 in) o/a; 68.50 m (224 ft 9 in) pressure hull
- Beam: 7.50 m (24 ft 7 in) o/a; 4.40 m (14 ft 5 in) pressure hull
- Height: 10.20 m (33 ft 6 in)
- Draught: 5.40 m (17 ft 9 in)
- Installed power: 4,400 PS (3,240 kW; 4,340 bhp) (diesels); 1,000 PS (740 kW; 990 shp) (electric)
- Propulsion: 2 shafts; 2 × diesel engines; 2 × electric motors
- Speed: 19.2 knots (35.6 km/h; 22.1 mph) surfaced; 6.9 knots (12.8 km/h; 7.9 mph) submerged
- Range: 23,700 nmi (43,900 km; 27,300 mi) at 10 knots (19 km/h; 12 mph) surfaced; 57 nmi (106 km; 66 mi) at 4 knots (7.4 km/h; 4.6 mph) submerged
- Test depth: 230 m (750 ft)
- Complement: 55 to 63
- Armament: 6 × torpedo tubes (four bow, two stern); 24 × 53.3 cm (21 in) torpedoes; 1 × 10.5 cm (4.1 in) SK C/32 deck gun (150 rounds); 1 × 3.7 cm (1.5 in) SK C/30; 2 × 2 cm (0.79 in) C/30 anti-aircraft guns

Service record
- Part of: 4th U-boat Flotilla; 14 March - 30 September 1942; 10th U-boat Flotilla; 1 October - 30 November 1942; 12th U-boat Flotilla; 1 December 1942 – 6 February 1944
- Identification codes: M 16 669
- Commanders: K.Kapt. Wilhelm Schulze; 14 March 1942 – 23 March 1943; K.Kapt. Robert Gysae; 24 March - 16 October 1943; K.Kapt. Heinz Buchholz; 17 October 1943 – 6 February 1944
- Operations: 3 patrols: 1st patrol: 17 September 1942 – 22 January 1943; 2nd patrol: a. 1 April - 1 October 1943; b. 23–26 December 1943; 3rd patrol: 2 January - 6 February 1944
- Victories: 14 merchant ships sunk (87,388 GRT); 1 merchant ship damaged (2,588 GRT)

German submarine U-177 was a Type IXD2 U-boat of Nazi Germany's Kriegsmarine during World War II. The submarine was laid down on 25 November 1940, at the DeSchiMAG AG Weser yard in Bremen, as yard number 1017. She was launched on 1 October 1941, and commissioned on 14 March 1942, under the command of Kapitänleutnant Wilhelm Schulze. After a period of training with the 4th U-boat Flotilla at Stettin, the boat was transferred to the 10th flotilla on 1 October 1942, and based at Lorient, for front-line service, she was then reassigned to the 12th flotilla at Bordeaux on 1 December.

She sank 14 ships of 87,388 gross register tons (GRT) and damaged one other of 2,588 GRT, but was herself sunk on 6 February 1944, in the Atlantic west of Ascension Island by a US Navy aircraft.

== Design ==
German Type IXD2 submarines were considerably larger than the original Type IXs. U-177 had a displacement of 1,610 tonnes (1,580 long tons) when at the surface and 1,799 tonnes (1,771 long tons) while submerged. The U-boat had a total length of 87.58 m (287 ft 4 in), a pressure hull length of 68.50 m (224 ft 9 in), a beam of 7.50 m (24 ft 7 in), a height of 10.20 m (33 ft 6 in), and a draught of 5.35 m (17 ft 7 in). The submarine was powered by two MAN M 9 V 40/46 supercharged four-stroke, nine-cylinder diesel engines plus two MWM RS34.5S six-cylinder four-stroke diesel engines for cruising, producing a total of 4,400 metric horsepower (3,240 kW; 4,340 shp) for use while surfaced, two Siemens-Schuckert 2 GU 345/34 double-acting electric motors producing a total of 1,000 shaft horsepower (1,010 PS; 750 kW) for use while submerged. She had two shafts and two 1.85 m (6 ft) propellers. The boat was capable of operating at depths of up to 200 metres (660 ft).

The submarine had a maximum surface speed of 20.8 knots (38.5 km/h; 23.9 mph) and a maximum submerged speed of 6.9 knots (12.8 km/h; 7.9 mph). When submerged, the boat could operate for 121 nautical miles (224 km; 139 mi) at 2 knots (3.7 km/h; 2.3 mph); when surfaced, she could travel 23,700 nautical miles (43,900 km; 27,300 mi) at 10 knots (19 km/h; 12 mph). U-177 was fitted with six 53.3 cm (21 in) torpedo tubes (four fitted at the bow and two at the stern), 24 torpedoes, one 10.5 cm (4.13 in) SK C/32 naval gun, 150 rounds, and a 3.7 cm (1.5 in) SK C/30 with 2575 rounds as well as two 2 cm (0.79 in) C/30 anti-aircraft guns with 8100 rounds. The boat had a complement of fifty-five.

== Operational history ==
=== First patrol ===
Under the command of Kptlt. Robert Gysae, U-177 left Kiel on 17 September 1942, and sailed north around the British Isles. On 23 September, the U-boat was bombed by a twin-engine aircraft southeast of Iceland, but crash-dived and sustained no damage. She then headed south to the waters off South Africa and Mozambique. There she sank eight ships totaling 49,371 GRT and damaged another of 2,588 GRT:

She had her first success on 2 November, sinking the unescorted 4,538 GRT Greek merchant steamer Aegeus off Cape Columbine. There were no survivors.

On 9 November, the U-boat attacked and damaged the unescorted 2,588 GRT British oil tanker Cerion south of Port Elizabeth with her 37 mm and 20 mm AA guns, after her deck gun malfunctioned, and several attacks with torpedoes failed.

The 7,006 GRT British tanker Scottish Chief was the next victim on 19 November; she was loaded with 13,000 tonnes (13,000 long tons; 14,000 short tons) of fuel oil, and was torpedoed by U-177 about 200 miles (320 km) east southeast of Durban. The ship exploded and sank in flames, with only 12 of the crew of 48 surviving.

The unescorted 7,191 GRT Liberty ship Pierce Butler was hit by two torpedoes from U-177 on 20 November. The ship's armed guards opened fire with her five-inch (130 mm) and three-inch (76 mm) guns, while the engines were secured; subsequently the eight officers, 33 crewmen and 21 armed guards abandoned ship in four lifeboats. Within half an hour the ship sank.

U-177 next sank the unescorted 6,796 GRT British troop transport RMS Nova Scotia southeast of Lourenço Marques on 28 November. The ship was carrying mail, passengers and 780 Italian prisoners of war and civilian internees from Port Tewfik, Massawa and Aden to Durban. Hit by three torpedoes, she sank within ten minutes. The U-boat picked up two survivors to identify the ship, who turned out to be Italian merchant sailors. Mindful of the Laconia Order issued two months previously, Gysae radioed the BdU (U-boat headquarters) and was ordered to continue his patrol while they notified the Portuguese authorities, who sent the frigate Afonso de Albuquerque to help. The frigate rescued only 194 survivors. From the 1,052 aboard, 858 were lost, including 650 Italians.

On 30 November, she sank the unescorted 10,799 GRT British troop transport SS Llandaff Castle with two torpedoes southeast of Lourenço Marques. The former Union-Castle Line passenger ship had 150 passengers on board, including six Soviet diplomats with their wives and children and 70 military officers with their families. Three crew members were lost. The survivors were later rescued by HMS Catterick.

U-177 torpedoed the unescorted 3,548 GRT Greek merchant ship Saronikos off Mozambique, on 7 December, which broke in half and sank within two minutes. The Germans questioned the only two survivors from the crew of 38, and provided them with bandages and provisions.

The boat torpedoed the unescorted 6,408 GRT British merchant ship Empire Gull on 12 December, in the Mozambique Channel, allowing the crew to abandon ship before opening fire with her deck gun, firing 70 incendiary and 100 high-explosive rounds, and scoring about 140 hits, which finally caused the ship to sink. Two crew members were lost in the attack, the master and 43 crewmen were later rescued up by HMS Inconstant and HMS Freesia.

On 14 December, the U-boat sank the 3,085 GRT Dutch merchant ship Sawahloento with her last torpedo, her destruction took seven minutes. The crew of 72 men abandoned ship in four lifeboats, three of which capsized when the boiler exploded, drowning most of the occupants. The 19 survivors in the last lifeboat were questioned, and then set sail towards the coast of South Africa, arriving two days later.

U-177 then headed for France, arriving in Bordeaux on 22 January 1943, after a voyage of 128 days.

=== Second patrol ===
U-177 left Bordeaux, 1 April 1943, for her second patrol around the Cape of Good Hope, where she sank six ships totaling 38,017 GRT. She attacked Convoy CD-20, 27 May, with a salvo of four torpedoes, hitting the 6,679 GRT United States merchant ship Agwimonte and the 7,886 GRT Norwegian tanker Storaas. Both ships were abandoned by their crews and were sunk with further torpedoes from U-177.

On 6 July the unescorted 7,129 GRT Canadian merchant ship Jasper Park was hit by two torpedoes from U-177, south southwest of Cap Sainte Marie, the extreme southern point of Madagascar. The U-boat fired another torpedo which either missed or was a dud, so she surfaced to sink the vessel with gunfire, but as she did so her target sank.

On 10 July 1943, U-177 struck the unescorted 7,176 GRT American Liberty ship Alice F. Palmer, with a single torpedo in the stern, blowing off the propeller and rudder, flooding the engine room, and breaking the back of the ship. The crew of 68 abandoned their vessel in four lifeboats, and after questioning them, U-177 shelled the ship, firing 14 incendiary and 85 high-explosive rounds. The burning ship slowly sank. The four lifeboats eventually sailed to Madagascar.

The 4,952 GRT British collier Cornish City was torpedoed and sunk on 29 July, southeast of Madagascar. The ship sank within a minute with the loss of 37 of her crew of 43. The survivors were questioned by the Germans and later picked up by HMAS Nizam.

The U-boat successfully attacked the unescorted 4,195 GRT Greek merchant ship Efthalia Mari east of Madagascar on 5 August, after spotting her using a Fa 330 Bachstelze rotor kite. Hit by two torpedoes, the ship sank in eight minutes. U-177 was one of only a few U-boats equipped with the aerial observation platform, and the only one to have successfully used it.

The submarine returned to Bordeaux, 1 October 1943, after 184 days at sea.

=== Third patrol and loss ===
Under the command of Korvettenkapitän Heinz Buchholz, U-177 sailed from La Pallice, where she had docked from 26 December 1943, till 2 January 1944, and once again headed south. On the 36th day of the patrol, 6 February, she was sunk in the Atlantic west of Ascension Island (at 10°35′S 23°15′W), by depth charges dropped by a P4BY-1 Liberator bomber from VB-107. Fifty men were lost, and 15 survived; they were picked up by USS Omaha.

== Summary of raiding history ==
Ships attacked
Date	Ship	Flag	GRT	Notes
2 November 1942	Aegeus	Greece	4,538	Sunk
9 November 1942	Cerion	United Kingdom	2,588	Damaged
19 November 1942	Scottish Chief	United Kingdom	7,006	Sunk
20 November 1942	Pierce Butler	United States	7,191	Sunk
28 November 1942	RMS Nova Scotia	United Kingdom	6,796	Sunk
30 November 1942	Llandaff Castle	United Kingdom	10,799	Sunk
7 December 1942	Saronikos	Greece	3,548	Sunk
12 December 1942	Empire Gull	United Kingdom	6,408	Sunk
14 December 1942	Sawahloento	Netherlands	3,085	Sunk
28 May 1943	Agwimonte	United States	6,679	Sunk
28 May 1943	Storaas	Norway	7,886	Sunk
6 July 1943	Jasper Park	Canada	7,129	Sunk
10 July 1943	SS Alice F Palmer	United States	7,176	Sunk
29 July 1943	Cornish City	United Kingdom	4,952	Sunk
15 August 1943	Efthalia Maria	Greece	4,195	Sunk

== Bibliography ==
- Busch, Rainer; Röll, Hans-Joachim (1999). German U-boat commanders of World War II : a biographical dictionary. Translated by Brooks, Geoffrey. London, Annapolis, Md: Greenhill Books, Naval Institute Press. ISBN 1-55750-186-6.
- Busch, Rainer; Röll, Hans-Joachim (1999). Deutsche U-Boot-Verluste von September 1939 bis Mai 1945 [German U-boat losses from September 1939 to May 1945]. Der U-Boot-Krieg (in German). Vol. IV. Hamburg, Berlin, Bonn: Mittler. ISBN 3-8132-0514-2.
- Gröner, Erich; Jung, Dieter; Maass, Martin (1991). U-boats and Mine Warfare Vessels. German Warships 1815–1945. Vol. 2. Translated by Thomas, Keith; Magowan, Rachel. London: Conway Maritime Press. ISBN 0-85177-593-4.
- Watts, John W. (10 April 2017). "Omaha II (CL-4)". Dictionary of American Naval Fighting Ships. Naval History and Heritage Command.
