= Charlotte Hawkins Brown =

American educator (1883–1961)

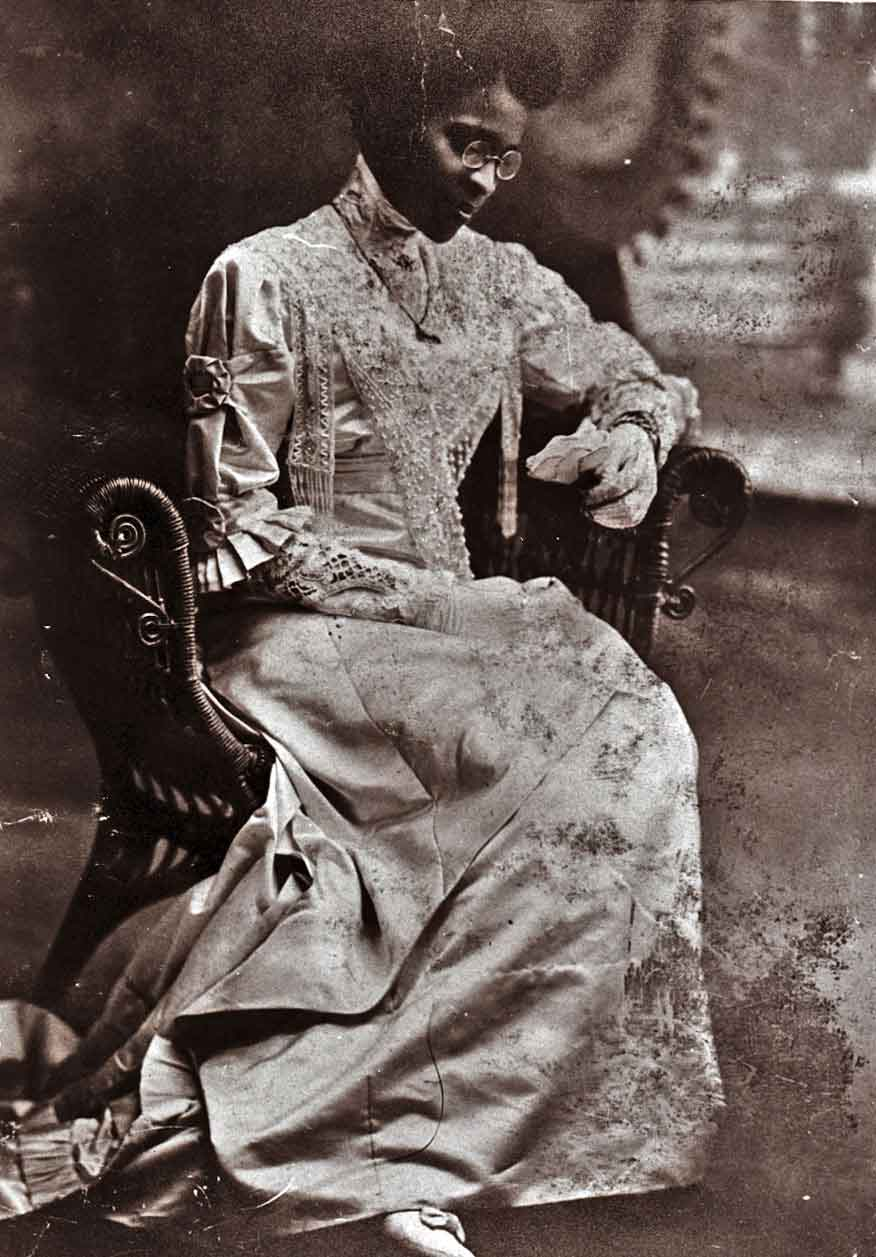
- Charlotte Hawkins Brown in wedding dress, 1912
- Born: June 11, 1883; Henderson, North Carolina, U.S.
- Died: January 11, 1961 (aged 77); Greensboro, North Carolina, U.S.
- Resting place: Charlotte Hawkins Brown Museum
- Occupation: Founder of the Palmer Institute
- Relatives: Maria Hawkins Cole (niece); Natalie Cole (grandniece); Carole Cole (grandniece)

Charlotte Hawkins Brown (June 11, 1883 – January 11, 1961) was an American author, educator, civil rights activist, and founder of the Palmer Memorial Institute in Sedalia, North Carolina.

== Early life ==
Charlotte Hawkins Brown was born in Henderson, North Carolina, on June 11, 1883, to Caroline Frances and an estranged father. The granddaughter of former slaves, she was born in a time where large numbers of African Americans were moving north. She moved to Cambridge, Massachusetts, at a young age, where she was raised and educated.

Along with her brother Mingo, Charlotte attended public school in Cambridge. She was chosen as a speaker for her first graduation and following this attended the Cambridge English High School. Though her mother was hesitant, Brown was dedicated to her education and chose to attend Salem State Normal School. All of her schooling expenses were paid by Massachusetts Board of Education member Alice Freeman Palmer, after they met by chance and Palmer was taken aback by Brown's dedication.

== Career ==
After one year of college, Brown was hired to work at the Bethany Institute, a rural school for African American children, in Sedalia, North Carolina. Brown arrived at the school, run by the American Missionary Association, in 1901 to find it severely lacking in resources.

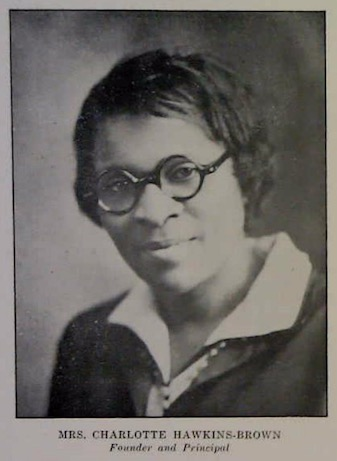
Image of Charlotte Hawkins Brown from At Calm Sedalia

When the American Missionary Association decided to close the school a year later, Brown decided to create a school on her own. Coming from humble beginnings in a small blacksmith's cabin, Brown continued raising money, eventually obtaining 200 acres and constructing two new buildings for her campus. The school, named the Palmer Memorial Institute in honor of Alice Freeman Palmer, opened on October 10, 1902, and was a day and boarding school for African Americans. Brown worked tirelessly to create a safe haven for African American youth, she established the Palmer Memorial Institute's board of trustees entirely of African Americans. Brown's institute served as one of the only schools in North Carolina to offer college preparatory programs.

By the 1920s, the Palmer Memorial Institute was an established and successful boarding school attracting students from around the country, many of whom went on to become educators. Brown attracted national attention for her efforts, lecturing frequently at colleges around the country and receiving several honorary degrees. In 1941 she published The Correct Thing To Do--To Say--To Wear, committing many of her educational philosophies and maxims in print. She continued to run the school until her retirement in 1952.

In addition to her work at the Palmer Institute, Brown was active in national efforts to improve opportunities for African Americans, including the Commission on Interracial Cooperation and the National Negro Business League. She was the first African American woman named to the national board of the YWCA. She was an honorary member of Alpha Kappa Alpha sorority.

== Personal life ==
She was a convert to Congregationalist Christianity, despite its rarity in the south.

== Legacy ==
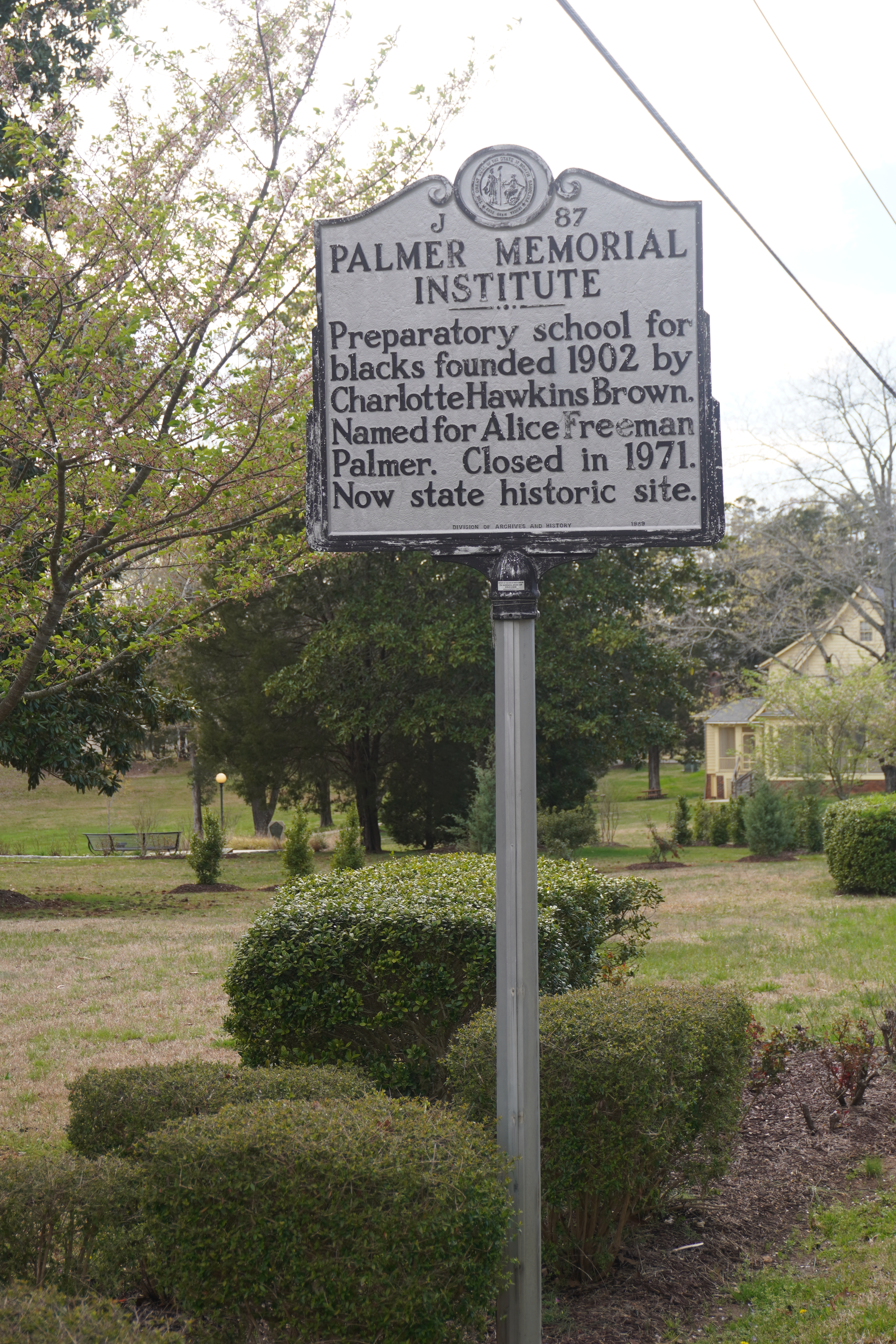
Palmer Memorial Institute Historical Marker

Brown's papers are at the Radcliffe Institute for Advanced Study at Harvard University.

The restored campus buildings of the Palmer Memorial Institute are now the Charlotte Hawkins Brown Museum, which links Brown and Palmer Memorial Institute to the larger themes of African American women, education, and social history, with an emphasis on the contributions made by African American citizens to education in North Carolina.

The museum's visitor center is located in the Carrie M. Stone Teachers' Cottage (1948), and features exhibits about Brown, the Institute and African American education in North Carolina. Visitors can tour Brown's residence, known as Canary Cottage, which has been furnished to reflect the 1940s and 1950s, when the school was at its peak.

Brown's brother, Mingo, was the father of jazz singer Maria Hawkins Cole, who became the wife of musician Nat King Cole and the mother of singer Natalie Cole and actress Carole Cole.

Brown's image was included in the 1945 painting Women Builders by William H. Johnson as part of his Fighters for Freedom series.

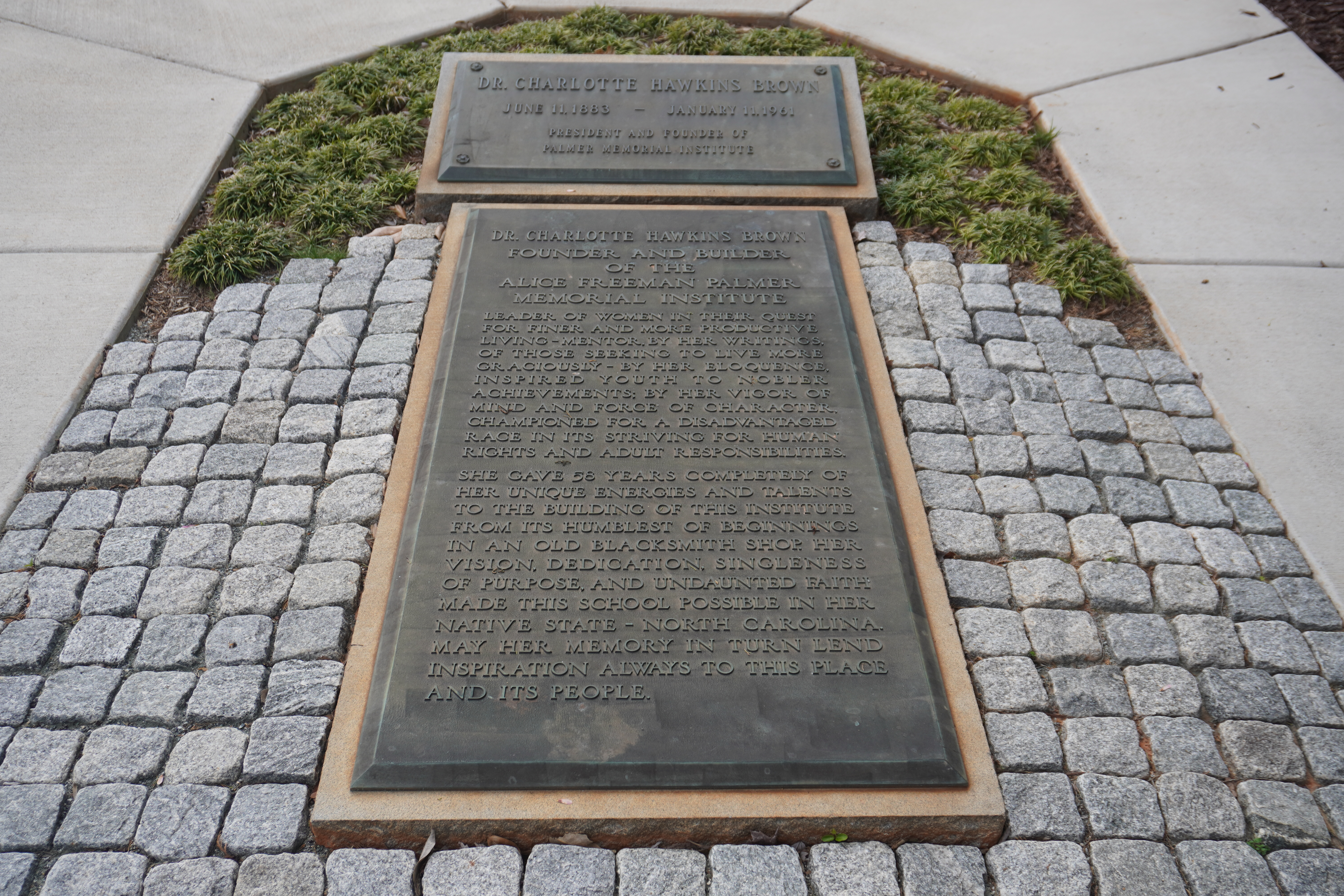
Charlotte Hawkins Browns grave, located at Charlotte Hawkins Brown Museum
