= HMS Freesia =

History

United Kingdom
- Name: HMS Freesia
- Ordered: 19 September 1939
- Builder: Harland and Wolff, Belfast
- Yard number: 1074
- Laid down: 18 June 1940
- Launched: 3 October 1940
- Completed: 19 November 1940
- Identification: Pennant number: K43
- Fate: Sold, 1946, sank 1 April 1947

General characteristics
- Class & type: Flower-class corvette
- Displacement: 940 long tons (960 t)
- Length: 205 ft (62 m)
- Beam: 33 ft (10 m)
- Draught: 11 ft 6 in (3.51 m)
- Propulsion: 2 × fire-tube boilers; 1 × triple-expansion steam engine
- Speed: 16 kn (30 km/h)
- Complement: 85
- Armament: 1 × BL 4-inch Mk IX gun; 2 × depth-charge throwers; 2 × stern depth-charge rails
- Notes: Armament was modified during wartime service

HMS Freesia was a Flower-class corvette of the British Royal Navy that served during the Second World War. Freesia was built in Belfast by Harland & Wolff, being launched on 3 October 1940 and completed on 19 November that year.

Freesia survived the war and was sold in 1946 for conversion to a merchant ship under the name Freelock. She was lost on 1 April 1947.

== Design and construction ==
The Flower-class arose as a result of the Royal Navy's realisation in the late 1930s that it had a shortage of escort vessels, particularly coastal escorts for use on the East coast of Britain, as the likelihood of war with Germany increased. To meet this urgent requirement, a design developed based on the whale-catcher Southern Pride – this design was much more capable than naval trawlers, but cheaper and quicker to build than the Hunt-class destroyers or Kingfisher-class sloops that were alternatives for the coastal escort role.

The early Flowers, such as Freesia, were 205 feet 0 inches (62.48 m) long overall, 196 feet 0 inches (59.74 m) at the waterline and 190 feet 0 inches (57.91 m) between perpendiculars. Beam was 33 feet 0 inches (10.06 m) and draught was 14 feet 10 inches (4.52 m) aft. Displacement was about 940 long tons (960 t) standard and 1,170 long tons (1,190 t) full load. Two cylindrical boilers fed steam to a Vertical Triple Expansion Engine rated at 2,750 indicated horsepower (2,050 kW) which drove a single propeller shaft. This gave a speed of 16 knots (18 mph; 30 km/h). 200 tons of oil were carried, giving a range of 4,000 nautical miles (4,600 mi; 7,400 km) at 12 knots (14 mph; 22 km/h).

Design armament was a single BL 4-inch Mk IX naval gun forward and a single 2-pounder "pom-pom" anti-aircraft gun aft. Fifty depth charges were carried, while later in the war the depth charges were supplemented by a Hedgehog anti-submarine mortar. Originally designed for a crew of 25, this had increased to 53 on entering service and to 80 by the end of the war. The Flower-class were also capable of being fitted for minesweeping, and Freesia was recorded as a minesweeping corvette in September 1941.

Freesia was one of twenty Flower-class ships ordered from Harland & Wolff on 19 September 1939. The ship was laid down at Harland & Wolff's Belfast shipyard on 18 June 1940, as yard number 1074, was launched on 3 October 1940 and completed on 19 November 1940. She was the first ship of that name to serve with the Royal Navy, and was assigned the pennant number K43.

== Service ==
From March 1941, Freesia is recorded as forming part of the escort of convoys in the North Atlantic, and from April adding convoys to Gibraltar and Freetown, Sierra Leone. In September 1941, it was decided to reinforce the South African station, and Freesia was one of eight Flower-class corvettes ordered to join that station.

Freesia took part in Operation Ironclad, the British invasion of Vichy French Madagascar. On 25 April 1942, Freesia left Durban, South Africa, as part of the escort of a convoy of slow ships, arriving off the beachheads near Diego Suarez on 5 May. Early that morning Freesia led the minesweepers Romney and Cromarty as they swept a channel to Courrier Bay, allowing landing ships carrying the troops of No. 5 Commando and the East Lancashire Regiment to reach the landing beaches. Later that day, the corvette Auricula struck a mine. The next day, Freesia attempted to tow Auricula to shallow water, but Auricula broke in two and sank. In September 1942, the British launched an offensive to capture the rest of Madagascar, with Freesia taking part in landings at Tamatave on 18 September 1942. On 12 December 1942, the unescorted British steamer Empire Gull was sunk by the German submarine U-177. Freesia and the destroyer Inconstant rescued 44 survivors from Empire Gull.

On 1 August 1943, Freesia was escorting Convoy BC2 in the Indian Ocean when the German submarine U-198 torpedoed the Dutch merchant ship Mangkalihat. Freesia picked up 84 survivors (18 people were killed) and took the damaged ship under tow, handing over to the tug Prudent on 4 August, but Mangkalihat sank later that day.

In August 1945, Freesia was serving as an Ari Sea Rescue ship for the East Indies Fleet.

== Disposal and loss ==
Freesia was sold in 1946 for conversion to a merchant ship, and was renamed Freelock. Freelock was lost on 1 April 1947 when she ran aground near San Jorge after breaking tow while on passage to Shanghai.

== Bibliography ==
- Admiralty War Diary September 1941: Days 1–15 (PDF). Admiralty. September 1941.
- Battle Summaries: No. 15.—Naval Operations off Ceylon 29th March to 10th April, 1942. No. 16.—Naval Operations at the Capture of Diego Suarez (Operation "Ironclad") May, 1942 (PDF). London: Tactical and Staff Duties Division, Admiralty. 1943.
- Casualty Return: Merchant Ships Totally Lost, Broken Up, &c. 1st April to 30th June, 1947 (PDF). London: Lloyd's Register of Shipping. August 1948.
- Colledge, J. J.; Warlow, Ben (2006) [1969]. Ships of the Royal Navy: The Complete Record of All Fighting Ships of the Royal Navy from the 15th Century to the Present (3rd Rev ed.). London: Chatham Publishing. ISBN 978-1-86176-281-8. OCLC 67375475.
- Elliott, Peter (1977). Allied Escort Ships of World War II: A complete survey. London: Macdonald and Jane's Publishers. ISBN 0-356-08401-9.
- Friedman, Norman (2008). British Destroyers and Frigates: The Second World War and After. Barnsley, UK: Seaforth Publishing. ISBN 978-1-84832-015-4.
- Lambert, John; Brown, Les (2008). Flower-Class Corvettes. St. Catharines, Ontario, Canada: Vanwall Publishing. ISBN 978-1-55068-986-0.
- Rohwer, Jürgen (2005). Chronology of the War at Sea 1939–1945: The Naval History of World War Two. Annapolis, Maryland, US: Naval Institute Press. ISBN 1-59114-119-2.
- Winser, John de S. (2002). British Invasion Fleets: The Mediterranean and beyond 1942–1945. Gravesend, UK: World Ship Society. ISBN 0-9543310-0-1.
