= George Herbert Palmer =

American scholar and author

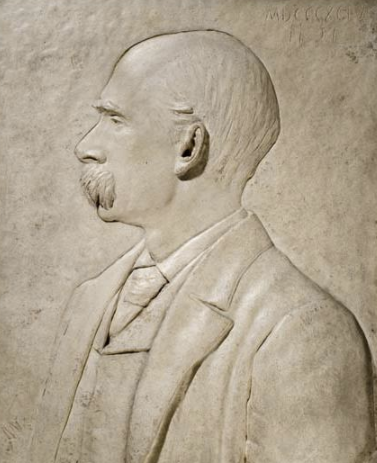
- Anne Whitney, Relief of George H. Palmer, 1896, Davis Museum at Wellesley College
- Born: March 9, 1842; Boston, Massachusetts
- Died: May 7, 1933 (aged 91); Cambridge, Massachusetts
- Resting place: Houghton Chapel, Wellesley College, Wellesley, Massachusetts
- Education: Harvard University, (BA, MA); University of Tübingen, Germany; Andover Theological Seminary (1870); A number of honorary LL.Ds and a Litt.D degree
- Occupation: Professor

George Herbert Palmer (March 9, 1842 – May 7, 1933) was an American scholar and author. He was a graduate, and then professor at Harvard University. He is also known for his published works, like the translation of The Odyssey (1884) and others about education and ethics, such as The New Education (1887) and The Glory of the Imperfect (1898).

== Early life ==
Palmer was born in Boston on March 9, 1842 to Julius Auboyneau and Lucy Manning Peabody Palmer. He had a brother, Frederic. He attended Phillips Academy in Andover, Massachusetts.

In 1864, he graduated at Harvard College with a bachelor's degree and three years later with a master's degree. Between 1867 and 1869, he studied at the University of Tübingen, Germany. He graduated from the Andover Theological Seminary in 1870.

== Career ==
In 1870, Palmer became an instructor of the Greek language. When someone commented that Palmer taught Greek, he said "You are mistaken. I do not teach Greek. I teach boys. Greek is what I start with." Between 1872 and 1876, Palmer curated the 'Gray Engravings' (a collection of engravings bequeathed to Harvard College by Francis Calley Gray), which he proposed to have photographed and make generally available the prints "to foster the growing taste in the community for the higher forms of Art" (thereby serving as a precursor to Harvard's Open Collection Program), as well as that Harvard's "students will soon prefer these to the inane works which now decorate too many of their rooms". Simultaneously (from 1872) Palmer also taught Philosophy, being elevated to the rank of Assistant Professor in 1873, and Professor in 1883 - a position he held for six years, when he became an Alford Professor of Natural Religion, Moral Philosophy, and Civil Polity at Harvard (a tenure that lasted from 1889 to 1913).

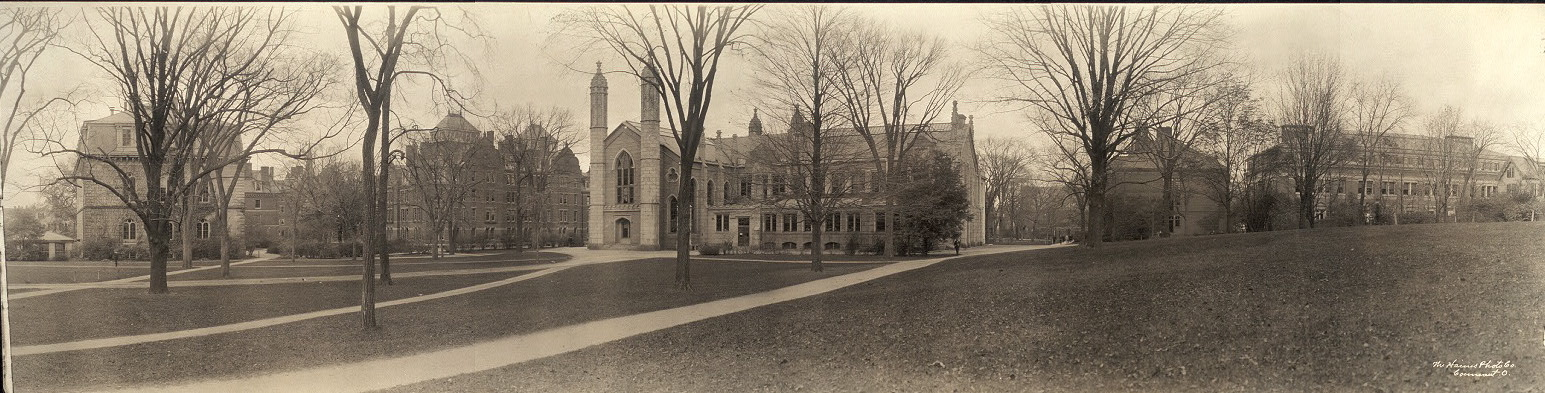
Harvard University, Cambridge, Massachusetts, about 1910

He said about ethics, "Right conduct consists in following one's conscience and doing one's duty for the sake of right and not for any ulterior purpose". He wished to, "burn the pictures of heaven and quench the fires of hell that men might do right for the sake of the right." It was stated in The Harvard Crimson that he was instrumental in the development of the character of the Philosophy department at Harvard, through his teaching methods and written works. He was particularly interested in classical literature and philosophy, as well as the poet George Herbert. Palmer enjoyed teaching and once said that he would gladly pay Harvard for the right. He was called the "Dean of teachers" for the manner in which he inspired students to become teachers.

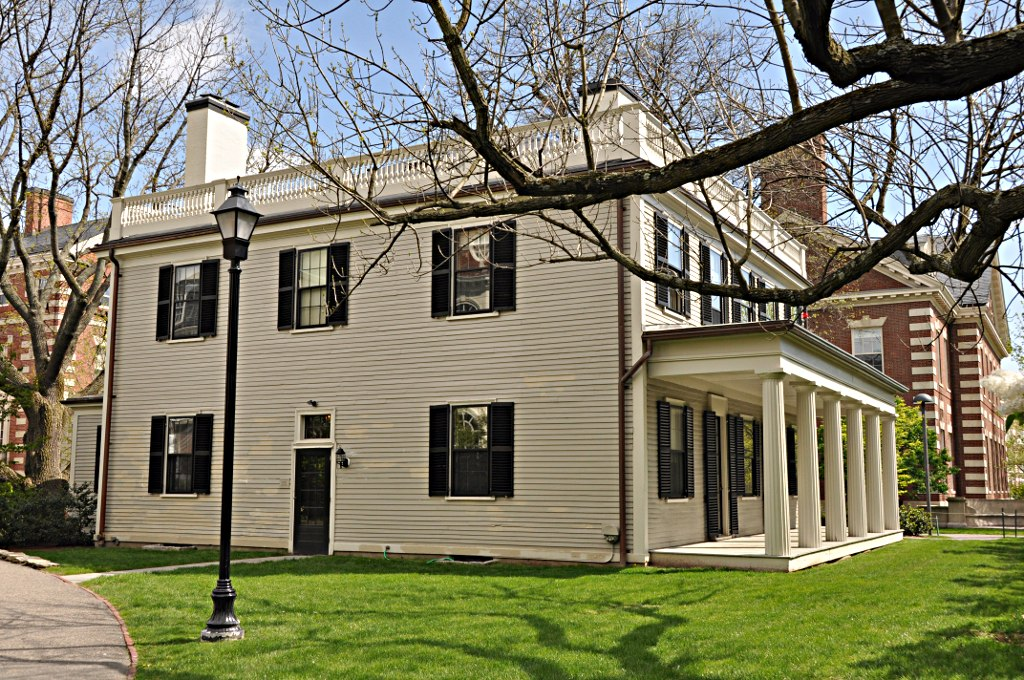
Dana-Palmer House, Harvard University

Among his books are the translation of The Odyssey, (1884), The New Education (1887), The Glory of the Imperfect (1898), Self-Cultivation in English (1897). He also wrote The Field of Ethics (1901), The Nature of Goodness (1904), The Life and Works of George Herbert (three volumes, 1905), The Teacher (1908), Intimations of Immortality in the Sonnets of Shakespeare (1912), and Trades and Professions (1914).

While at Harvard, Professor Palmer lived in Dana-Palmer House, which bears his name. It is also called the Harvard University Guest House. He retired in 1913, but remained active on the campus, such as his popular readings of the classics.

Between 1894 and 1909, Palmer received honorary LL.D degrees from the University of Michigan, Union, Dartmouth, and Harvard. He received and honorary Litt.D degree from Western Reserve in 1897. In 1917, he received an honorary degree from the University of California.

== Personal life ==
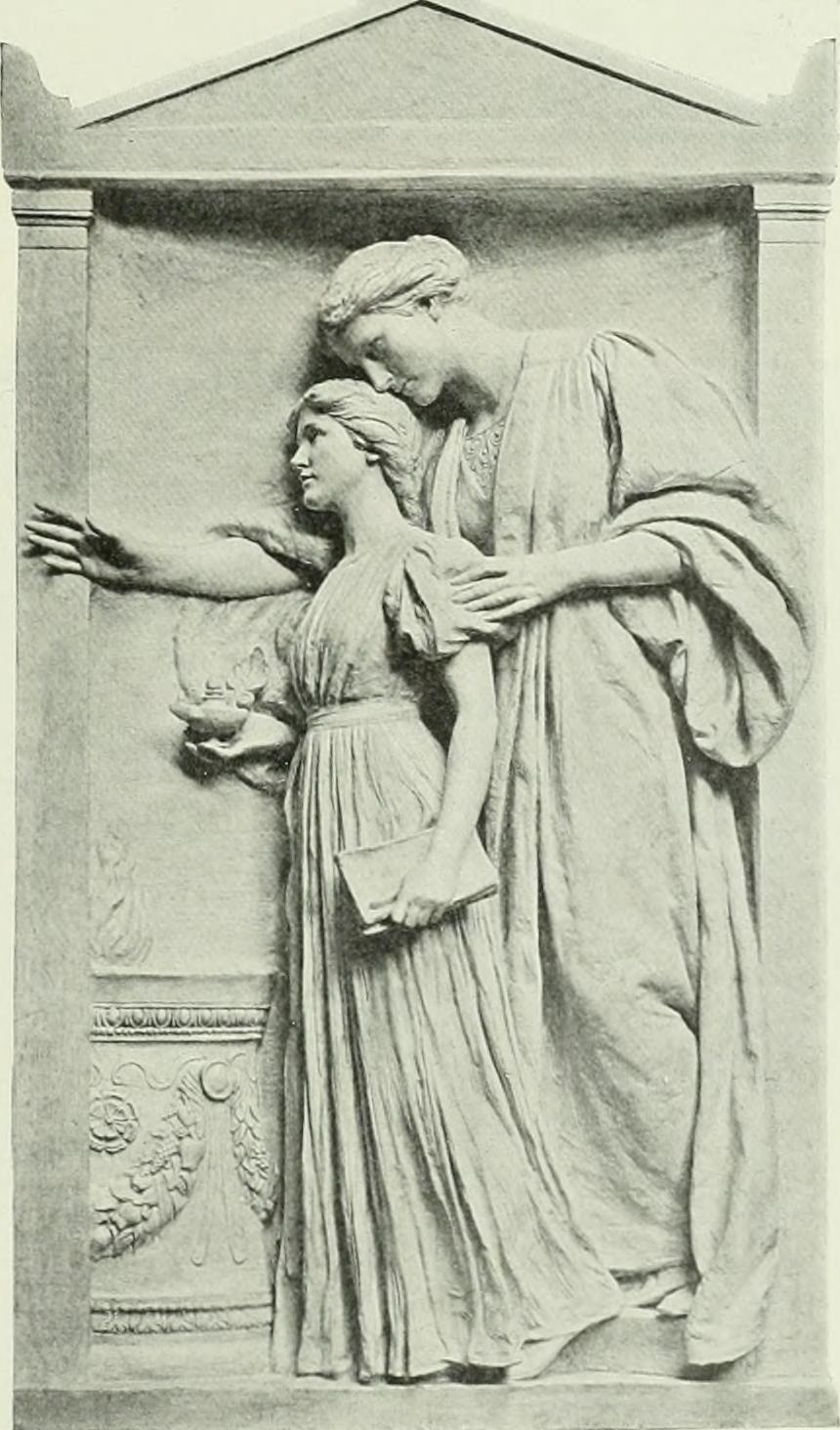
Daniel Chester French, Alice Freeman Palmer Memorial, Houghton Chapel, Wellesley College

He married his first wife, Ellen Margaret Wellman from Brookline, Massachusetts, in 1871 and she died in 1879.

On December 23, 1887, he married, as his second wife, Alice Freeman Palmer, who was the president of Wellesley College. They had a "marriage of comradeship". They both pursued their individual careers, and George contributed efforts to managing the household, particularly when she was at the University of Chicago during her post there as dean of women. He had a home in Boxford, Massachusetts, for summer and other vacation trips. Palmer had three sabbaticals, during which they lived in their favorite cities and traveled through the countryside on bicycles. During his third sabbatical, in December 1902, the Palmers were in Paris and Alice required surgery. She died of an abdominal condition now treatable with antibiotics. After her death, he wrote The Life of Alice Freeman Palmer (1908).

He died on May 7, 1933, at 91 years of age and his ashes were buried with his wife's at the Houghton Chapel of Wellesley College.

== See also ==
- American philosophy
- List of American philosophers

== Sources ==
- American Academy of Arts and Sciences (1935). "George Herbert Palmer (1842-1933)". Proceedings of the American Academy of Arts and Sciences. Metcalf and Company. p. 533.
- Baltimore Sun (May 8, 1933). "George Herbert Palmer". Baltimore Sun. p. 5 – via newspapers.com.
- Buckham, John Wright (1920). "George Herbert Palmer, An Ideal Teacher". The Unitarian Register. American Unitarian Association. p. 279.
- Crimson Staff (May 8, 1933). "George Herbert Palmer". The Crimson. Harvard University.
- Gilman, D. C.; Thurston, H. T.; Colby, F. M., eds. (1905). "Palmer, George Herbert". New International Encyclopedia (1st ed.). New York: Dodd, Mead.
- Ithaca Journal (May 12, 1933). "George Herbert Palmer". Ithaca Journal. p. 4 – via newspapers.com.
- James, Edward T.; Janet Wilson James; Paul S. Boyer; Radcliffe College (1971). Notable American Women, 1607–1950: A Biographical Dictionary. Harvard University Press. p. 8. ISBN 978-0-674-62734-5.
- "Dana, Richard Henry - Palmer, George Herbert House". Massachusetts Cultural Resource Information System.
- Marquis, Albert Nelson (1915). "Palmer, George Herbert". Who's who in New England: A Biographical Dictionary of Leading Living Men and Women of the States of Maine, New Hampshire, Vermont, Massachusetts, Rhode Island and Connecticut. A.N. Marquis & Company. p. 816.
- Massachusetts Moments (25 November 2006). "Alice Freeman and George Herbert Palmer Marry December 23, 1887". Massachusetts Moments. Massachusetts Foundation for the Humanities.
