= SS Alice F. Palmer =

Liberty ship of World War II

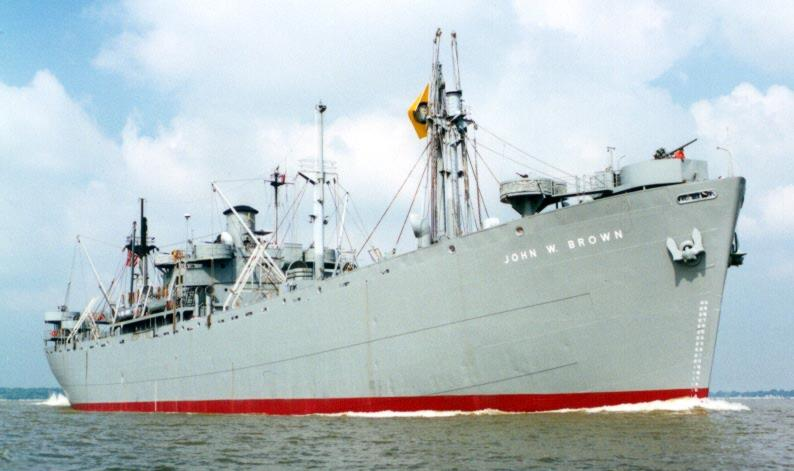
- SS John W Brown, a ship of the same class.

History

United States
- Name: Alice F. Palmer
- Namesake: Alice Freeman Palmer
- Operator: American-Hawaiian SS Company, then Isthmian SS Company
- Builder: California Shipbuilding Corporation, Terminal Island, Los Angeles
- Laid down: 12 February 1943
- Launched: 12 March 1943
- Identification: IMO number: 243112; Callsign: KKTF
- Fate: Torpedoed and sunk off Mozambique, 10 July 1943

General characteristics
- Class & type: Liberty ship; type EC2-S-C1, standard
- Tonnage: 10,865 LT DWT; 7,176 GRT
- Displacement: 3,380 long tons (3,434 t) (light); 14,245 long tons (14,474 t) (max)
- Length: 441 feet 6 inches (135 m) oa; 416 feet (127 m) pp; 427 feet (130 m) lwl
- Beam: 57 feet (17 m)
- Draft: 27 ft 9.25 in (8.4646 m)
- Installed power: 2 × Oil fired 450 °F (232 °C) boilers, operating at 220 psi (1,500 kPa); 2,500 hp (1,900 kW)
- Propulsion: 1 × triple-expansion steam engine, (manufactured by Joshua Hendy Iron Works, Sunnyvale, California); 1 × screw propeller
- Speed: 11.5 knots (21.3 km/h; 13.2 mph)
- Capacity: 562,608 cubic feet (15,931 m^{3}) (grain); 499,573 cubic feet (14,146 m^{3}) (bale)
- Complement: 38–62 USMM; 21–40 USNAG
- Armament: Varied by ship; Bow-mounted 3-inch (76 mm)/50-caliber gun; Stern-mounted 4-inch (102 mm)/50-caliber gun; 2–8 × single 20-millimeter (0.79 in) Oerlikon anti-aircraft (AA) cannons and/or, 2–8 × 37-millimeter (1.46 in) M1 AA guns

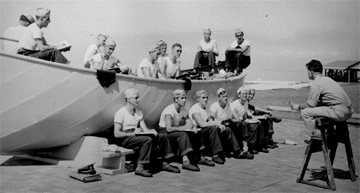
Liberty ship lifeboat training

SS Alice F. Palmer was a Liberty ship built by California Shipbuilding Corporation of Los Angeles, laid down on 12 February 1943 and launched on 12 March 1943 for the War Shipping Administration (WSA) as hull number 726. The vessel was named for Alice Freeman Palmer, the president of Wellesley College from 1881 to 1887 and Dean of Women at the University of Chicago from 1892 to 1895. Alice F. Palmer's call sign was KKTF. She was operated as a United States Merchant Marine ship by the American President Lines of San Francisco. Alice F. Palmer was torpedoed and sank off Mozambique on 10 July 1943, during World War II.

== Sinking ==
Alice F. Palmer loaded cargo and departed San Pedro on 6 April 1943. She arrived at Sydney, Australia, on 30 April. She departed on 3 May for Bombay, India. and arrived on 31 May. She departed Bombay on 7 June and arrived on 11 June at Colombo, Ceylon. On 11 June she departed for Calcutta, India, and arrived on 17 June. On 23 June she departed Calcutta for Colombo and arrived on 28 June. She departed for Durban, South Africa, where she was to load new cargo. Alice F. Palmer did not make it to Durban. In the Indian Ocean on 6 April 1943, she was torpedoed by the German submarine U-177, the single torpedo hit the stern, blowing off the propeller and rudder. All the crew made it into the ship's lifeboats. U-177 surfaced and signaled all the lifeboats to come alongside the submarine. The crew were questioned by the German officers, asking about cargo and destinations. U-177 then shelled the Alice F. Palmer to sink the ship more quickly. Alice F. Palmer burned and sank by the stern at 4:00 pm at 26°30′S 44°10′E, south of Madagascar. All four lifeboats became separated in the Indian Ocean. Each lifeboat had some food, (pemmican, malted milk pills called Horlicks, crackers), fishing gear, sail for rain collecting and water kegs for emergency.

On 29 July Alice F. Palmer's lifeboat #1, with 15 crew members landed near Lourenço Marques in Portuguese Mozambique. At Lourenço Marques they were able to get a passage to U.S. Naval facility at Durban, South Africa. On 26 July 1943, lifeboat #2 with 11 of the merchants and 11 United States Navy Armed Guards landed on Bazaruto Island, Portuguese East Africa of Mozambique. From Bazaruto Island, on 28 July a motorboat took them to Vilancula. On Vilancula they rested and treated the crew that were ill. On 4 August the crew walked from Vilancula to another small village, in the morning they walked to another small village. At this another small village, they were able to get a ride in a 1929 Ford flatbed truck, to Inhambane. At Inhambane they stayed the night at a Catholic church dormitory. At Inhambane they were able to get a small passenger ship to Lourenco Marques. From Lourenco Marques they took a train to Johannesburg. From Johannesburg they were able to take a train to Durban, South Africa. They arrived on 20 September 1943, to Durban, which Alice F. Palmer was traveling to. A Durban they meet up with the crew of Lifeboat #1.

On 13 July 1943, three days after the sinking, Lifeboat #3's crew of 20 was spotted and picked up by a British Consolidated PBY Catalina flying boat 60 miles (97 km) southeast of Madagascar. The flying boat could not take off with the weight of all 20 men. So, the Catalina taxied as a boat the 60 miles to Madagascar. As she entered the surf the aircraft broke, but all made it to the beach safely. Lifeboat #4 with a crew of 22 landed on the north shore of Madagascar on 30 July.

== Portugal Mozambique ==
Portugal Mozambique was neutral in World War II, as such the United States Navy Armed Guards changed out of their US Navy uniforms and into civilian clothes. All the Natives and Portuguese people in Mozambique treated the crew very well, giving them places to rest and food.
