= McLean House (Little Rock, Arkansas) =

Historic house in Arkansas, United States

- U.S. National Register of Historic Places
- U.S. Historic district – Contributing property
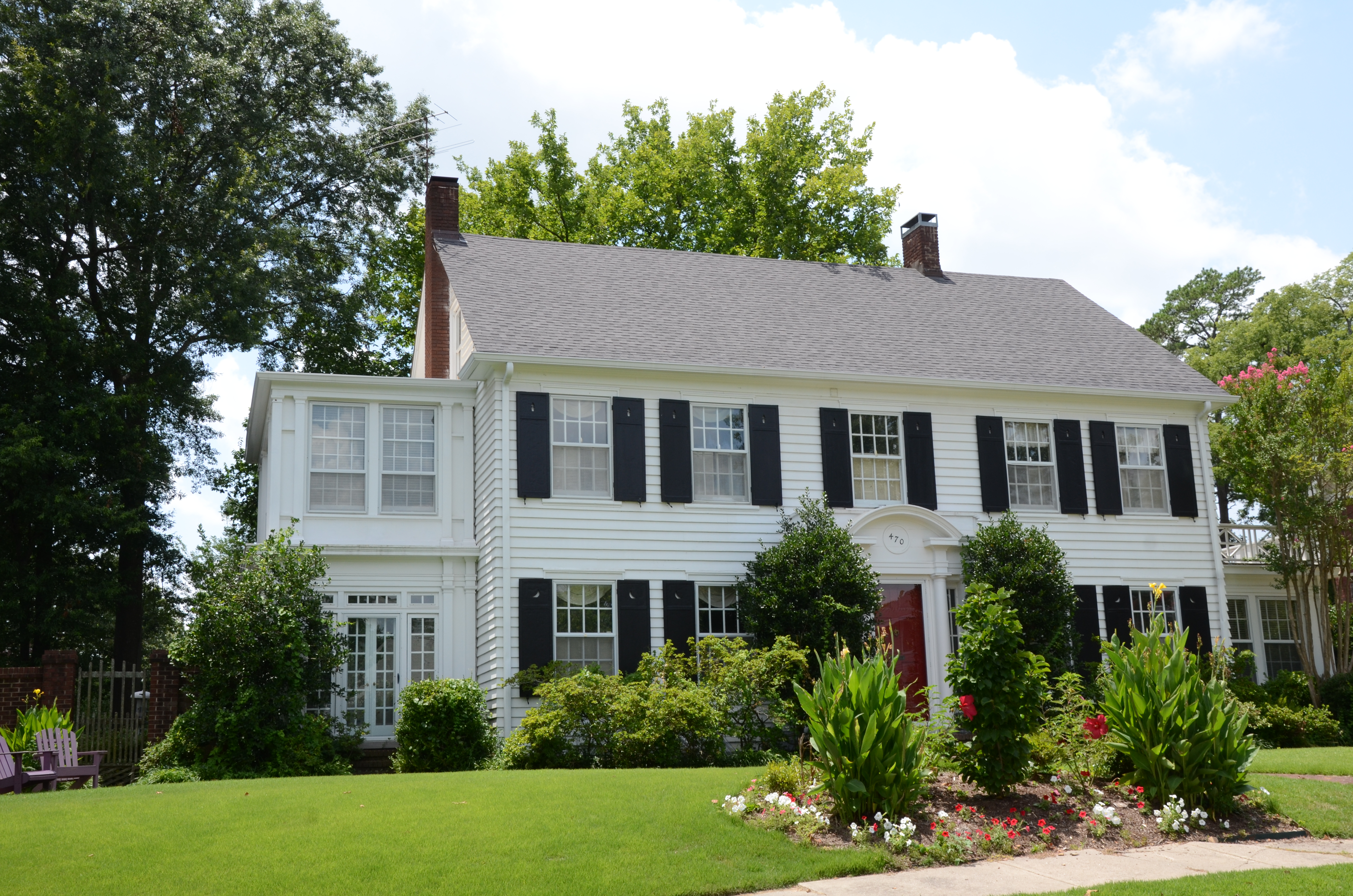

- Location within Arkansas Location within the United States
- Location: 470 Ridgeway, Little Rock, Arkansas
- Coordinates: 34°45′14″N 92°18′43″W
- Area: less than one acre
- Built: 1920
- Architect: Thompson & Harding
- Architectural style: Colonial Revival
- Part of: Hillcrest Historic District (ID90001920)
- MPS: Thompson, Charles L., Design Collection TR
- NRHP reference No.: 82000908

Significant dates
- Added to NRHP: December 22, 1982
- Designated CP: December 18, 1990

The McLean House is a historic house at 470 Ridgeway in Little Rock, Arkansas. It is a 2 1/2-story Colonial Revival wood-frame structure, five bays wide, with a side gable roof and weatherboard siding. The main entrance is distinguished by its surround, with Tuscan columns supporting an oversized segmented-arch pediment. Enclosed porches with paneled and pilastered corners extend to either side of the main block. The house designed by the architectural firm of Thompson and Harding and built around 1920.

The house was listed on the National Register of Historic Places in 1982.

== See also ==
- National Register of Historic Places listings in Little Rock, Arkansas
