= Maria Cole =

American jazz singer (1922–2012)

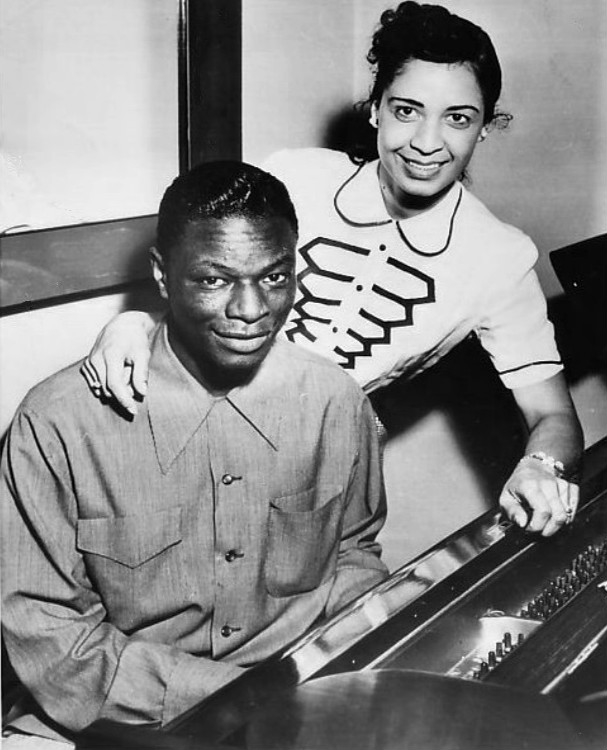
- Cole with her husband Nat, 1951

Background information
- Birth name: Maria Antoinette Hawkins
- Born: August 1, 1922; Boston, Massachusetts, U.S.
- Died: July 10, 2012 (aged 89); Boca Raton, Florida, U.S.
- Genres: Jazz
- Occupations: Singer
- Years active: 1936–1955
- Labels: Capitol
- Spouses: Spurgeon Ellington (m. 1943, died); Nat King Cole (m. 1948; died 1965); Gary DeVore (m. 1969; div. 1978)
- Children: 5, including Natalie Cole

Maria Cole (née Hawkins; August 1, 1922 – July 10, 2012) was an American jazz singer and the wife of singer Nat King Cole; mother of the singer Natalie Cole.

== Early life ==
Cole was born in Boston and was the niece of Charlotte Hawkins Brown. Her father Mingo Hawkins was a letter carrier. Her mother Carol died while giving birth to her sister.

In 1943 she married Spurgeon Ellington, a member of the Tuskegee Airmen, the all-black unit of the Army Air Corps in World War II. He died during a training flight.

On March 28, 1948 (Easter Sunday), Maria married Nat King Cole. The Coles were married in Harlem's Abyssinian Baptist Church by Adam Clayton Powell Jr. They had five children: Natalie (1950–2015), who had a successful career as a singer; an adopted daughter, Carole (1944–2009, the daughter of Maria's sister), who died of lung cancer at the age of 64; an adopted son, Nat Kelly Cole (1959–1995), who died at the age of 36; and twin daughters, Casey and Timolin (born September 26, 1961), whose birth was announced in the "Milestones" column of Time magazine on October 6, 1961.

Maria supported Nat during his final illness and stayed with him until his death. Five years after the death of Nat King Cole, Maria Cole bought a house in Tyringham, Massachusetts, known as South House, where she raised her five children, including singer Natalie Cole.

Maria was married to screenwriter Gary DeVore from 1969 until their divorce in 1978.

== Career ==
She was a jazz singer who worked with Count Basie and Duke Ellington, under the name Marie Ellington. She met Nat "King" Cole while they were both singing at the Zanzibar club.

She was co-host of a talk show, "Tempo," that aired on KHJ television in Los Angeles in the 1960s.

== Death ==
Cole died in a nursing home in Boca Raton, Florida on July 10, 2012, at the age of 89, shortly after being diagnosed with cancer.

== Discography ==
- A Girl They Call Maria (Kapp, 1954)
- Maria Cole (Dot, 1960)
- Love Is a Special Feeling (Capitol, 1966)
