= Dr. Joseph A. McLean House =

Historic house in North Carolina, United States

- U.S. National Register of Historic Places
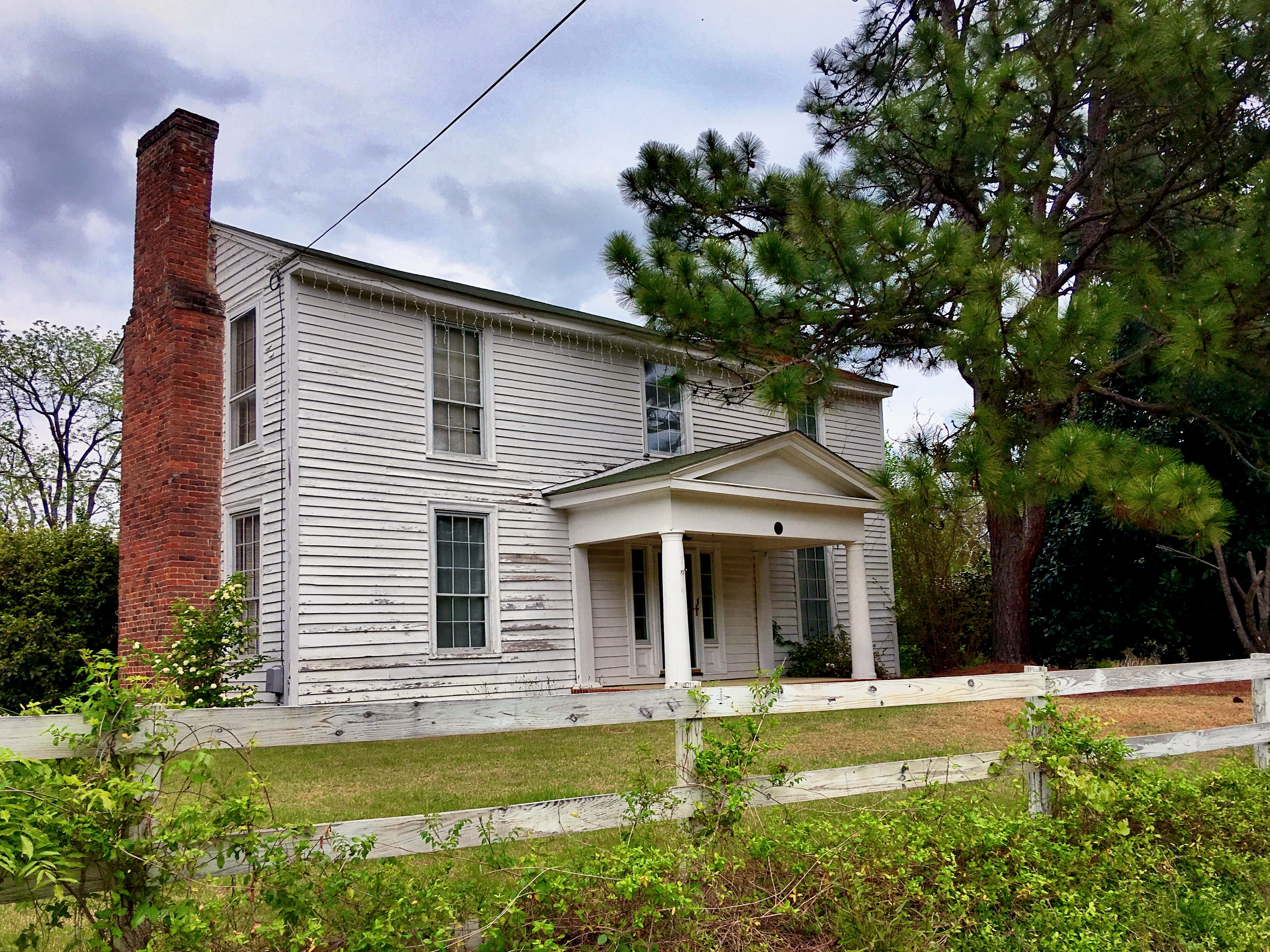

- Location within North Carolina Location within the United States
- Location: US 70 north side, 0.1 miles (0.16 km) west of junction with SR 3053, near Sedalia, North Carolina
- Coordinates: 36°4′15″N 79°37′54″W
- Area: 1.6 acres (0.65 ha)
- Built: c. 1850
- Architectural style: Greek Revival
- NRHP reference No.: 94001632
- Added to NRHP: February 2, 1995

Dr. Joseph A. McLean House is a historic home located near Sedalia, Guilford County, North Carolina. It was built about 1850, and is a two-story, three-bay, vernacular Greek Revival style dwelling. The house originated as a two-story log structure and has a one-story gable-roofed rear ell. The front facade features a massive one-story pedimented portico at the central entrance bay.

It was listed on the National Register of Historic Places in 1995.
