= Charles Wilson Knapp =

American painter (1823–1900)

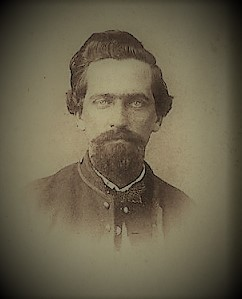
- Born: 1823; Philadelphia, Pennsylvania, U.S.
- Died: May 15, 1900 (aged 76–77); Philadelphia, Pennsylvania, U.S.
- Occupation: Landscape painter

Charles Wilson Knapp (1823 – May 15, 1900) was an American landscape painter who worked in the Hudson River School and luminist styles.

== Biography ==
Knapp was born in 1823 in Philadelphia, Pennsylvania. He lived in Philadelphia for most of his life besides a brief stint in New York City from 1859 to 1861.

Knapp painted natural landscapes of the Northeastern United States. One of his favorites spots was the Susquehanna River area. He exhibited at the National Academy of Design, the Pennsylvania Academy of the Fine Arts, and the Massachusetts Charitable Mechanics Association.

Knapp died on May 15, 1900, in Philadelphia. His paintings are in the permanent collections of the Pennsylvania Academy of the Fine Arts, the Albany Institute of History & Art, the Fleming Museum of Art, and the Hood Museum of Art. His son, Charles R., was also a painter.
