= Sedalia, North Carolina =

- Town
- Location in Guilford County and the state of North Carolina
- Coordinates: 36°04′42″N 79°37′43″W
- Country: United States
- State: North Carolina
- County: Guilford

Area
  - Total: 2.01 sq mi (5.20 km^{2})
  - Land: 2.00 sq mi (5.18 km^{2})
  - Water: 0.0077 sq mi (0.02 km^{2})
- Elevation: 663 ft (202 m)

Population (2020)
  - Total: 676
  - Density: 338.1/sq mi (130.55/km^{2})
- Time zone: UTC-5 (Eastern (EST))
  - Summer (DST): UTC-4 (EDT)
- ZIP code: 27342
- Area code: 336
- FIPS code: 37-60180
- GNIS feature ID: 2407307
- Website: sedalianc.org

Sedalia is a town in Guilford County, North Carolina, United States. As of the 2020 census, the population of the town was 676.

== History ==
The Dr. Joseph A. McLean House and Palmer Memorial Institute Historic District are listed on the National Register of Historic Places.

== Geography ==
Sedalia is located in eastern Guilford County. U.S. Route 70 (Burlington Road) passes through the center of the town, leading east 11 miles (18 km) to Burlington and west 11 miles (18 km) to Greensboro. Interstate 40 passes just south of Sedalia, with access from Exit 135 (Rock Creek Dairy Road).

According to the United States Census Bureau, the town has a total area of 2.1 square miles (5.4 km^{2}), of which 0.01 square miles (0.02 km^{2}), or 0.30%, is water.

== Demographics ==
Historical population
Census	Pop.	Note	%±
2000	618		—
2010	623		0.8%
2020	676		8.5%
2022 (est.)	682	▲	0.9%
U.S. Decennial Census

As of the census of 2000, there were 618 people, 226 households, and 181 families residing in the town. The population density was 266.8 inhabitants per square mile (103.0/km^{2}). There were 240 housing units at an average density of 103.6 per square mile (40.0/km^{2}). The racial makeup of the town was 13.92% White, 83.82% African American, 0.16% Asian, 0.32% from other races, and 1.78% from two or more races. Hispanic or Latino of any race were 0.32% of the population.

There were 226 households, out of which 27.0% had children under the age of 18 living with them, 51.3% were married couples living together, 22.6% had a female householder with no husband present, and 19.9% were non-families. 18.6% of all households were made up of individuals, and 5.8% had someone living alone who was 65 years of age or older. The average household size was 2.71 and the average family size was 3.03.

In the town, the population was spread out, with 20.6% under the age of 18, 9.7% from 18 to 24, 24.1% from 25 to 44, 32.0% from 45 to 64, and 13.6% who were 65 years of age or older. The median age was 42 years. For every 100 females, there were 100.6 males. For every 100 females age 18 and over, there were 94.8 males.

The median income for a household in the town was $43,021, and the median income for a family was $45,469. Males had a median income of $28,571 versus $26,591 for females. The per capita income for the town was $17,348. About 9.8% of families and 10.8% of the population were below the poverty line, including 18.1% of those under age 18 and 2.7% of those age 65 or over.

== Places of interest ==
Sedalia is home to the Charlotte Hawkins Brown Museum on the site of the former Palmer Memorial Institute (1902–1971), a preparatory school for African-American students.
