= Sears Tower – Harvard Observatory =

- Sears Tower–Harvard Observatory
- U.S. National Register of Historic Places
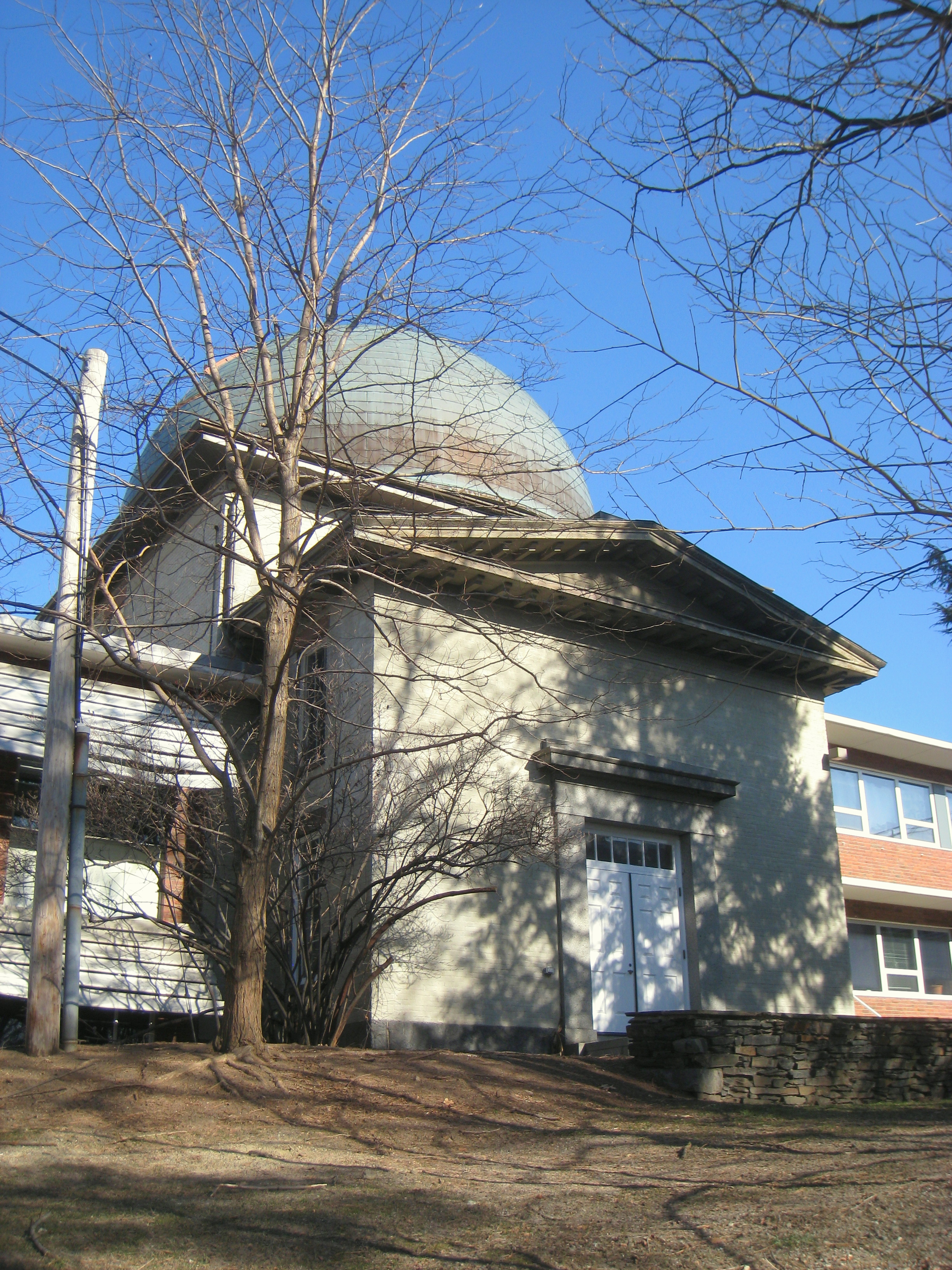

- Location within Massachusetts Location within the United States
- Location: Cambridge, Massachusetts
- Coordinates: 42°22′53.26″N 71°7′42.13″W
- Built: 1843
- Architect: Isaiah Rogers
- MPS: Cambridge MRA
- NRHP reference No.: 86002075
- Added to NRHP: February 26, 1987

The Sears Tower–Harvard Observatory is a historic astronomical observatory that is part of Harvard Observatory and is located at 60 Garden Street in Cambridge, Massachusetts. Now just a portion of the observatory's Building A, the Sears Tower is the oldest portion of the complex, designed by Isaiah Rogers and constructed in 1843. This structure is a square brick building, with a projecting cornice and a Greek Revival entrance framed by pilasters. The dome was equipped with a 15-inch telescope, the state of the art at the time.

The tower was listed on the National Register of Historic Places in 1987.

== See also ==
- List of astronomical observatories
- National Register of Historic Places listings in Cambridge, Massachusetts
