= Henry McLean House =

Historic house in North Carolina, United States

- U.S. National Register of Historic Places
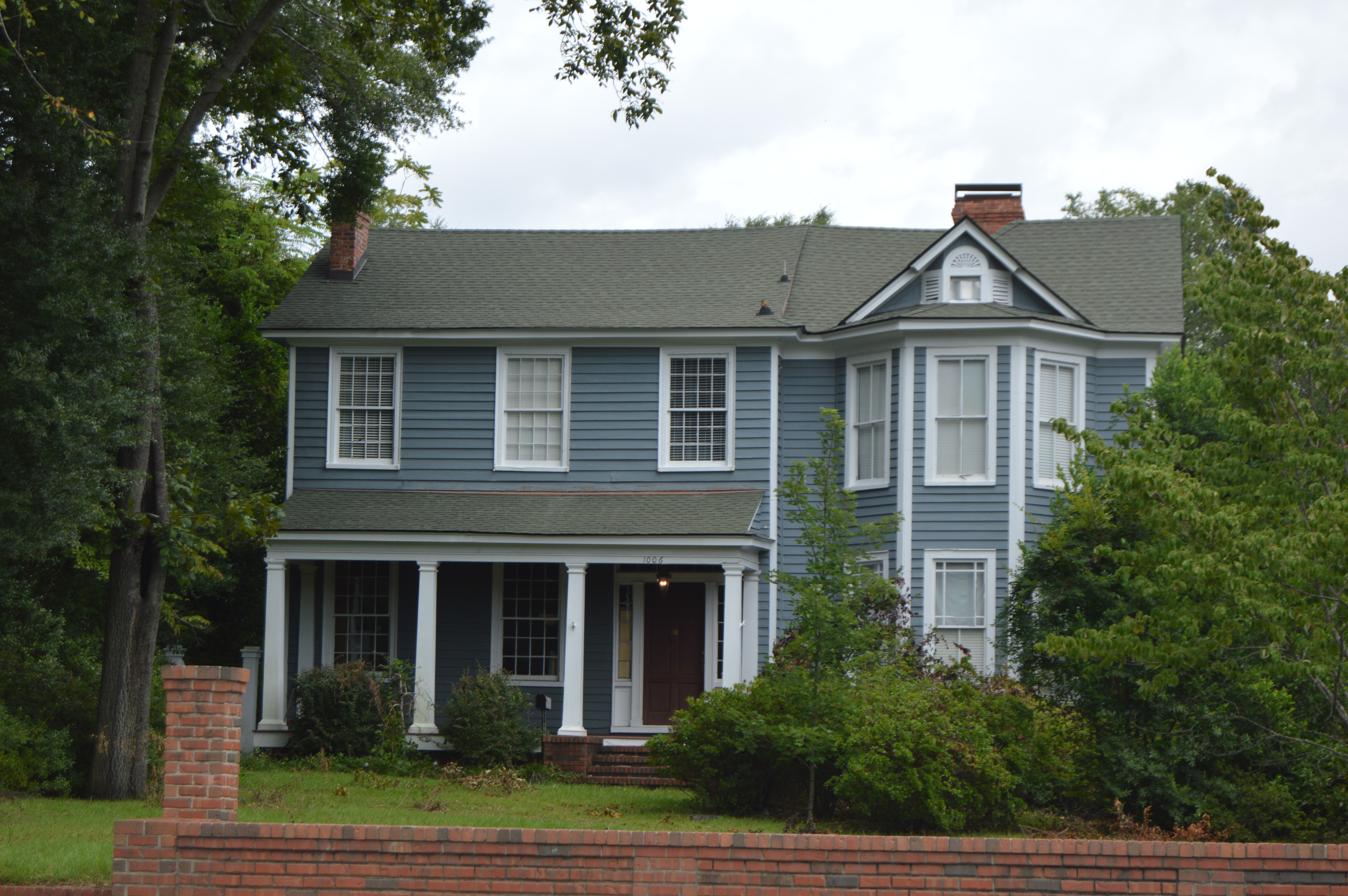
- Facade

- Location within North Carolina Location within the United States
- Location: 1006 Hay St., Fayetteville, North Carolina
- Coordinates: 35°3′23″N 78°53′50″W
- Area: less than one acre
- Built: c. 1840, 1875-1880
- Architectural style: Greek Revival
- MPS: Fayetteville MRA
- NRHP reference No.: 83001864
- Added to NRHP: July 7, 1983

Henry McLean House is a historic home located at Fayetteville, Cumberland County, North Carolina. The original section was built about 1840, and is a two-story, side-hall plan, vernacular Greek Revival style frame dwelling. A Victorian style two-story, four room wing was added between about 1875 and 1880. Additional rooms were added in the early-20th century.

It was listed on the National Register of Historic Places in 1983.
