= Mary J. Farnham =

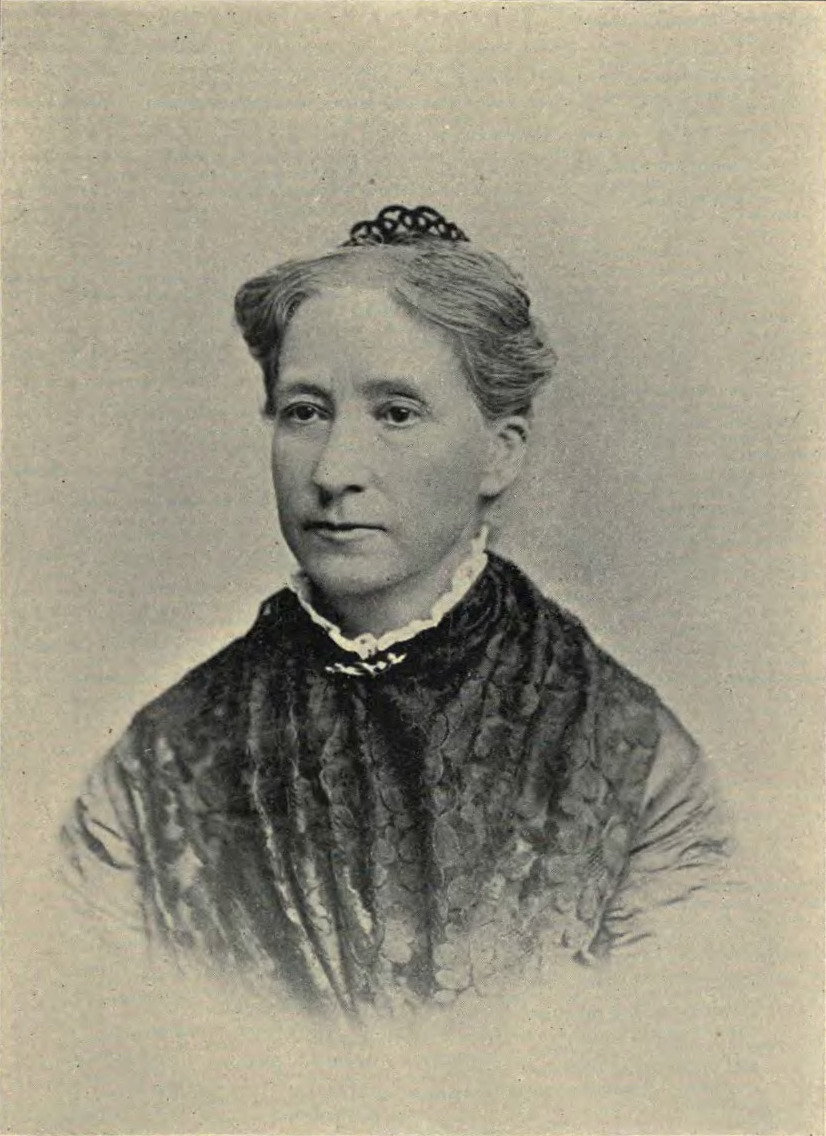
- Born: Mary Jane Scott; November 22, 1833; Newcastle-on-Tyne, England
- Died: February 22, 1913 (aged 79); Shanghai, China
- Occupations: missionary; temperance activist
- Organizations: Presbyterian Board of Foreign Missions; Woman's Christian Temperance Union
- Spouse: John Marshall Willoughby Farnham (m. 1859)
- Children: 7

Mary J. Farnham (née Scott; November 22, 1833 – February 22, 1913) was a British-born American missionary and temperance advocate. For 20 years, she served as president of the Woman's Christian Temperance Union (W.C.T.U.) of China. As a missionary to Shanghai, Farnham conducted a free day school for poor girls and a large boarding school.

== Early life and education ==
Mary Jane Scott was born at Newcastle-on-Tyne, England, November 22, 1833. Her parents were Thomas Scott (1807-?) and Catherine (nee Dean) (1809-1832).

She was educated privately. A total abstainer from childhood, she was always interested in temperance work.

In 1854, after both parents died in a single day by a cholera epidemic, Farnham emigrated to the U.S. to live with her sister in New York, locating first in Albany, and afterward in Brooklyn.

== Career ==
On May 4, 1859, she married the Rev. John Marshall Willoughby Farnham (1839-1917) in Schenectady, New York, and in October of that year, sailed with her husband for China, both Mr. and Mrs. Farnham having been engaged as missionaries by the Presbyterian Board of Foreign Missions. For 54 years, they carried on their work. When Mary Greenleaf Clement Leavitt went to Shanghai, Farnham was happy to welcome her to her home, and later to co-operate with Miss Ackerman, and Mrs. Andrew and Dr. Katharine Bushnell in their work in China.

In 1861, she and her husband founded "The Mary Farnham Girls' School" (Chinese: 清心女子中学, now called Shanghai No.8 High School).

For more than a quarter-century, Farnham was active in temperance work. From 1878 to 1882, she was prominent in the Independent Order of Good Templars, at one time holding the office of Worthy Chief Templar. Later, she interested herself in the W.C.T.U., which was established in China in 1880, becoming president of the W.C.T.U. of China in 1890, and continuing in that office for more than 20 years. She was indefatigable in her efforts to advance the cause of temperance.

== Personal life ==
The Farnham's had seven children: Elizabeth Scott (b. 1861); Mary Hittie (1862-1863); Maggie Scott (1864-1868); Mabelle (b. 1866); Bertha (1868-1870); Katie Thorburn (b. 1870); and Alfred David (1873-1874).

Mary Jane Scott Farnham died in Shanghai, China, February 22, 1913.

On March 3, 1913, the following appreciative memorial minute was adopted by the Presbyterian Board of Foreign Missions:—

The Board learned with the deepest sorrow of the death in Shanghai on February 22nd of Mrs. J. M. W. Farnham, who, with Dr. Farnham have been, in time of service, the oldest missionaries of the Board in China. Mrs. Farnham was born at Newcastle-on-the-Tyne in 1833, was married to Dr. Farnham on May 4th, 1859, and sailed with her husband for China on October 29th of the same year. Since 1859, with only four furloughs in the 54 years, she and her husband have carried on their work in Shanghai. They arrived in the midst of the Tai-ping Rebellion, when all the country to the west of Shanghai, and, indeed, up to the very gates of the city, was in commotion, the struggle between the Taipings and Imperialists surrounding the buildings of the Mission at the South Gate. Together they founded the Boys’ School now known as the Lowrie High School, and began the Girls’ Boarding School which has continued its work at the South Gate uninterruptedly ever since. In addition to her own work of teaching and evangelization, Mrs. Farnham taught many classes for women and guided the work of the Chinese Bible women, and helped her husband in his varying work of evangelization and education, in the Press and in the Tract Society. After many years at the South Gate, Dr. and Mrs. Farnham moved to the Hong Kew section of the Foreign Settlement, which they made the center of their work in helping the Chinese churches which were growing up, and where their home opened its generous hospitality to all and where Mrs. Farnham's kind and friendly spirit brought good cheer to the Chinese, to the missionaries and to foreign visitors. The Board voted to record its grateful acknowledgment of her long and loving service and to express its affectionate sympathy with Dr. Farnham, and to assure him of its prayer that his remaining years might be filled with blessing as the years that had gone before when he and Mrs. Farnham wrought together.

In 1913, Rev. Farnham published A Devoted Life, a compilation in memory of his wife, containing memorial notices, letters of condolences from missionaries and friends in China, England, the U.S., some verses written by Mrs. Farnham, and her music to "The Radiant Morn Has Passed Away". The frontispiece was adorned with a portrait of Mrs. Farnham.
