= Henry Fowle Durant =

American lawyer

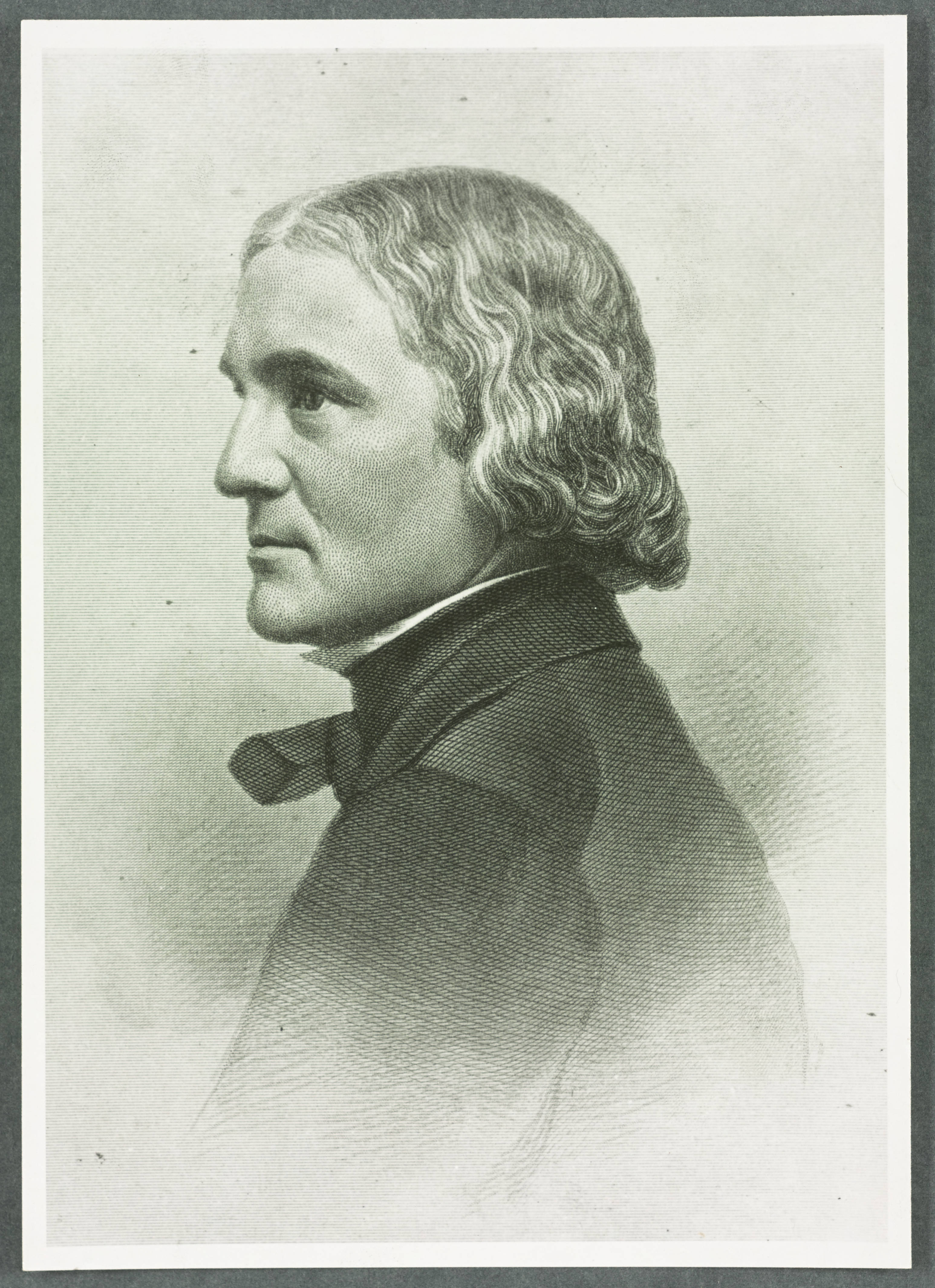
Henry Fowle Durant

Henry Fowle Durant (born Henry Welles Smith; February 20, 1822 – October 3, 1881) was an American lawyer and philanthropist, as well as the co-founder, with his wife, Pauline Durant, of Wellesley Female Seminary, which became Wellesley College.

== Early life and career ==
Durant was born in Hanover, New Hampshire, as Henry Welles Smith on February 20, 1822. He changed his name to Henry Fowle Durant on November 25, 1851, to avoid confusion with a local businessman.

He completed his studies in Harvard Law School at Harvard University in 1841. He was admitted to the Middlesex bar in 1843, and worked with his father in business until 1847. He subsequently practiced in Boston.

== Personal life ==
Durant married his cousin, Pauline Adeline Durant (née Fowle), in 1855. The couple went on to have two children, Henry "Harry" Fowle Durant and Pauline Cazenove Durant. Both children died in early childhood.

After the death of his son, Harry, Durant underwent a religious conversion and became a lay preacher in Massachusetts and New Hampshire, practicing from 1864 to 1875.

Henry Durant died from Bright's Disease at his home in Wellesley, Massachusetts on October 3, 1881, at the age of 59. He was buried at Mount Auburn Cemetery.

== Legacy ==
In 1870, Henry and Pauline Durant contributed between one and two million dollars to found Wellesley Female Seminary in Wellesley, Massachusetts. Durant, a staunch believer in female education, famously said, "Women can do the work. I give them the chance."
