= Hunnewell =

Hunnewell may refer to:

Places in the United States

- Hunnewell, Kansas
- Hunnewell, Kentucky
- Hunnewell, Missouri
- H. H. Hunnewell estate, Wellesley, Massachusetts
- Hunnewell Estates Historic District, Wellesley, Massachusetts

People

- H. H. Hunnewell (1810–1902), railroad financier, horticulturist, philanthropist
- Susannah Hunnewell (1966–2019), American editor and publisher
