= George R. Shaw =

American architect and botanist (1848–1937)

- Born: October 28, 1848; Parkman, Maine, U.S.
- Died: January 15, 1937 (aged 88); Concord, Massachusetts, U.S.
- Occupation: Architect
- Practice: G. R. & R. G. Shaw; Shaw & Hunnewell

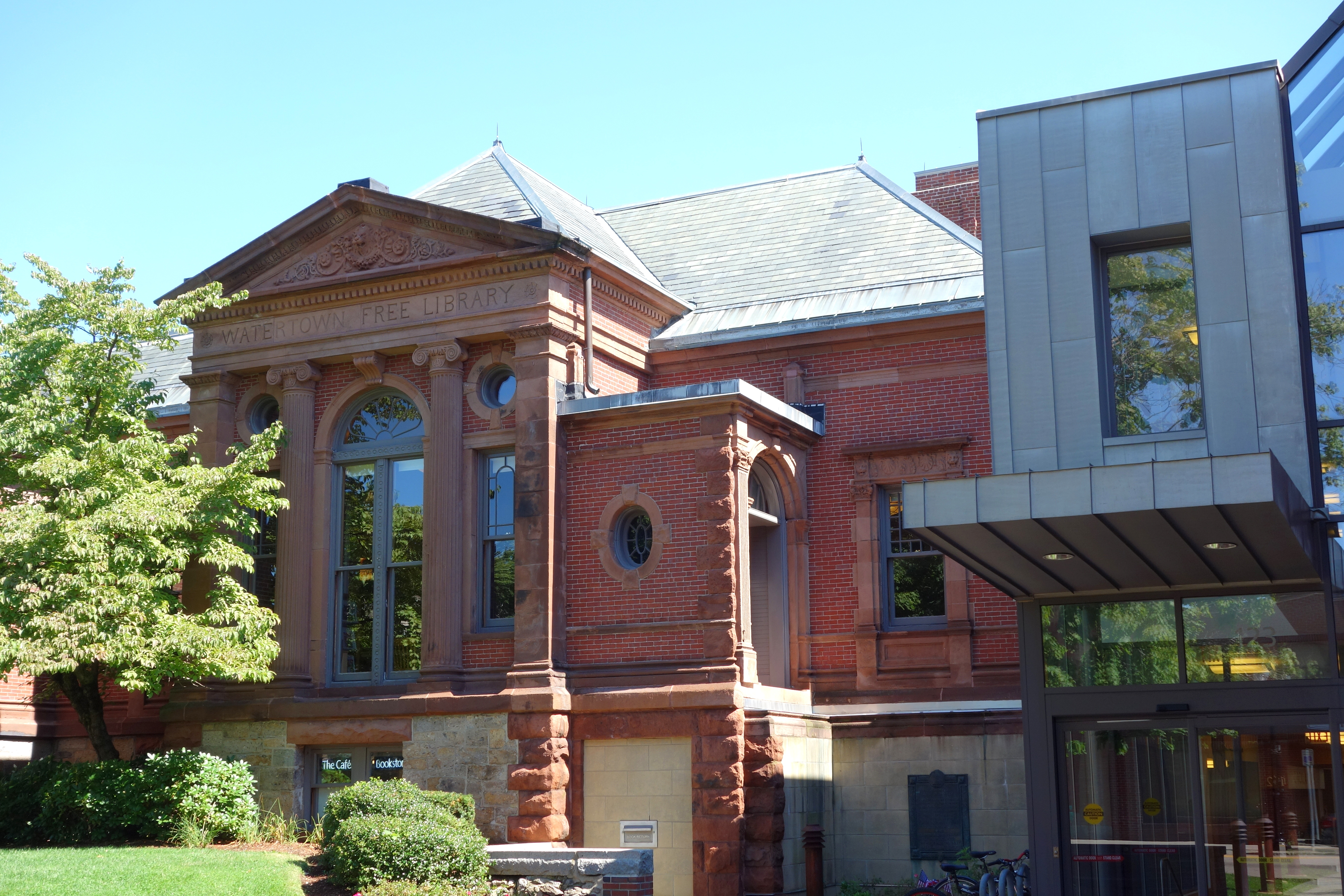
The Watertown Free Public Library, completed in 1884.

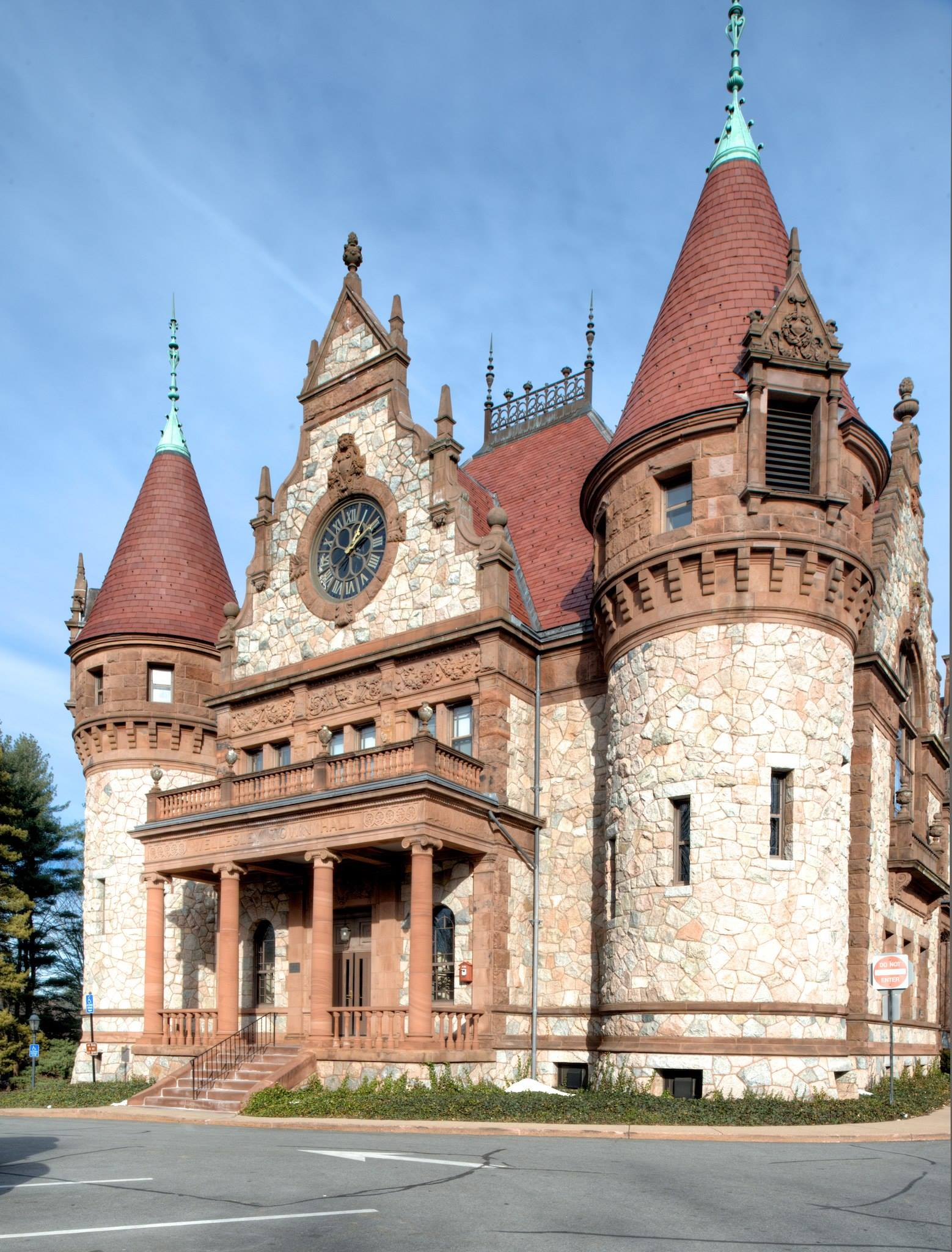
The Wellesley Town Hall, completed in 1885.

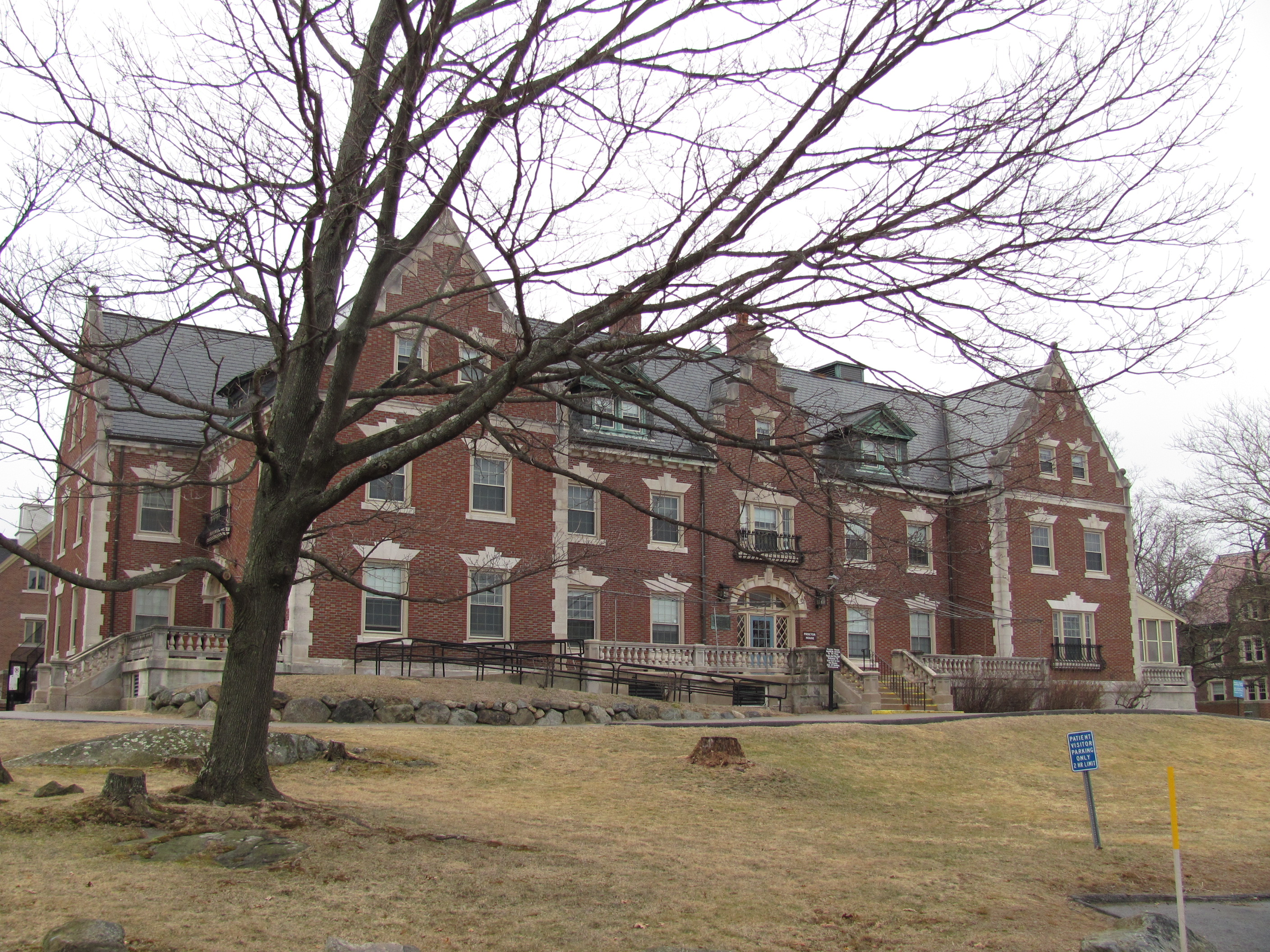
Proctor House of McLean Hospital, completed in 1895.

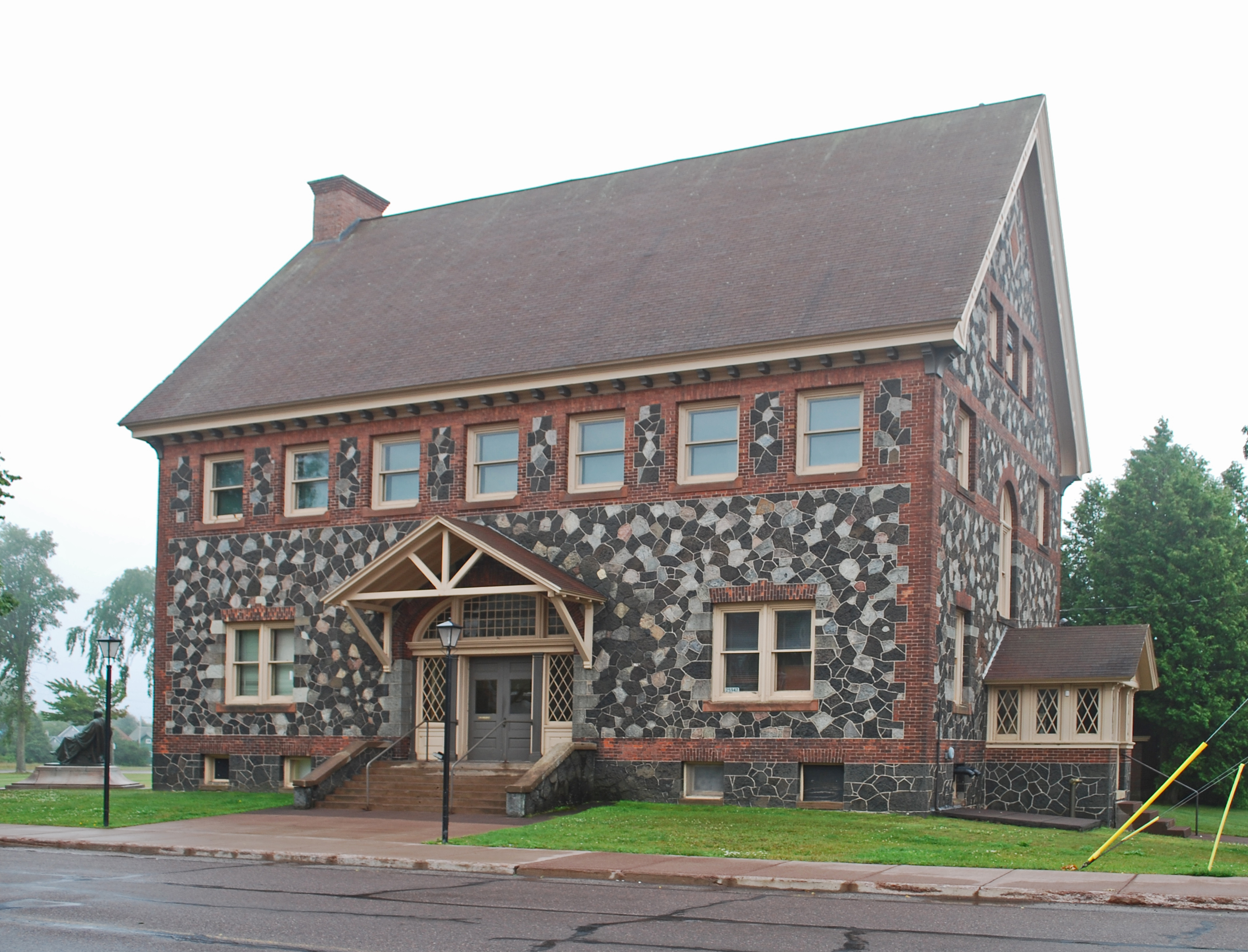
The former Calumet and Hecla Mining Company library in Calumet, Michigan, completed in 1898.

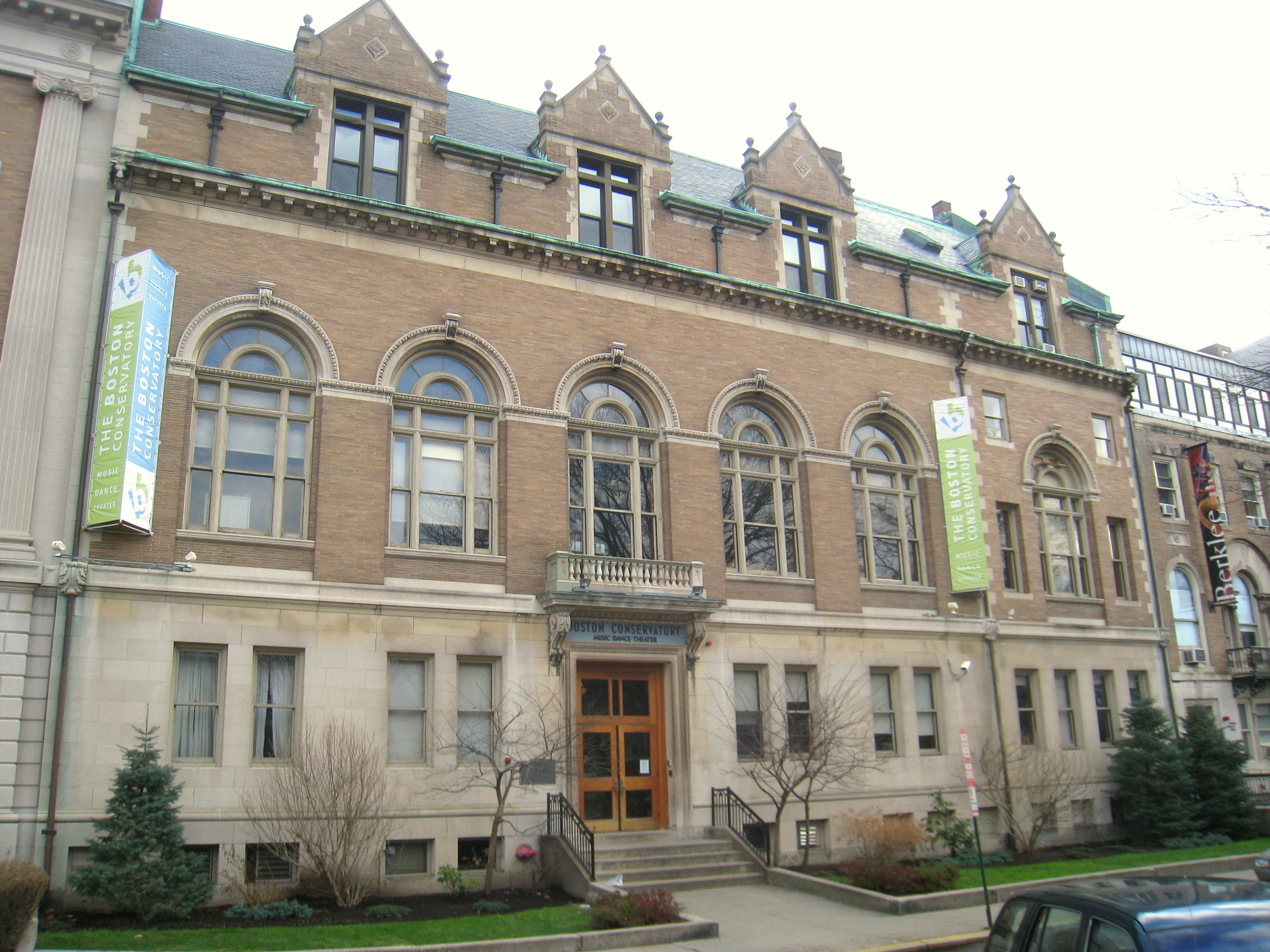
The former Boston Medical Library, completed in 1901.

George R. Shaw FAIA (1848–1937) was an American architect in practice in Boston from 1874 to 1902. In retirement, he was noted as a botanist.

== Life and career ==
George Russell Shaw was born October 28, 1848, in Parkman, Maine to Samuel Parkman Shaw, an attorney, and Hannah (Buck) Shaw. He was raised in Waterville and Portland before the family moved to Cambridge, Massachusetts in 1863. He graduated from Harvard University as a member of the class of 1869, and in 1870, traveled to Europe, where for six months he studied art at the National Art Training School in London. In 1871, Shaw and his younger brother, Robert G. Shaw (1850–1931), were both admitted to the Polytechnische Schule München in Munich, but ill health obliged him to withdraw in March 1872. He regained his health after several months of travel, and in November, resumed the study of architecture in Paris. In spring of 1874, he passed the examinations of the École des Beaux-Arts, but returned to the United States in October, soon after his marriage.

In late 1874, upon his return to the United States, Shaw began to practice architecture. In December, he formed a partnership with his brother, who had studied in Munich until January 1874 and since then had been working as a drafter for Abel C. Martin. They practiced together under the name of G. R. & R. G. Shaw until 1882, when Robert G. Shaw retired to manage several Boston-area estates and trusts. Effective January 1, 1883, Shaw formed a new partnership with Henry S. Hunnewell (1851–1931), who had been in the office since he returned from his own European education in 1881. Hunnewell was the brother-in-law of Robert G. Shaw and the son of H. H. Hunnewell, the firm's most important client. The firm of Shaw & Hunnewell was active until the retirement of both architects in 1902.

Shaw was made a Fellow of the Boston Society of Architects in 1875, and shortly thereafter became a member of the American Institute of Architects. He, like all AIA members, became a Fellow in 1889 when the AIA merged with the Western Association of Architects. In 1902, after his retirement, he was elected a corresponding member of the AIA.

== Personal life ==
Shaw was married in 1874 to Emily Mott, a granddaughter of Lucretia Mott, in Paris. After his return to the United States they settled in Boston, where they had three children: Francis George Shaw (born 1875), Isabel Pelham Shaw (1877–1962) and Thomas Mott Shaw (1878–1965). Like his father, T. Mott Shaw became a noted architect and in 1923 was cofounder of the architectural firm now known as Perry Dean Rogers Architects.

In 1910, Shaw moved to Concord to be closer to his children. In retirement, he studied botany, with a particular interest in plants of the genus Pinus. He traveled extensively in his research, and published several papers and books on the subject. He died January 15, 1937, at home in Concord.

From 1884 until his death, Shaw was a member of the Society of the Cincinnati, succeeding his uncle, Francis G. Shaw, in representing their ancestor, Samuel Shaw.

== Legacy ==
Two buildings designed by Shaw, with his partners, have been individually listed on the United States National Register of Historic Places, and others contribute to listed historic districts.

== Architectural works ==
- Hunnewell court, (Note: The first purpose-built tennis court in the United States, built for H. H. Hunnewell and Nathaniel Thayer Jr. and later demolished to build Back Bay station.) Buckingham St, Boston (1876, demolished 1897)
- University Museum extensions, Harvard University, Cambridge, Massachusetts (1880 and 1900, NRHP 1986)
- Samuel L. Powers house, 96 Arlington St, Newton, Massachusetts (1881)
- Welles Building, 18 Broadway, New York City (1881–83, demolished)
- Wellesley Town Hall and Wellesley Free Library, 525 Washington St, Wellesley, Massachusetts (1881–83 and 1883–85, NRHP 1976)
- Watertown Free Public Library, 123 Main St, Watertown, Massachusetts (1882–84)
- Hill Hurst, (Note: A contributing resource to the Hunnewell Estates Historic District, NRHP-listed in 1988.) 82 Pond Rd, Natick, Massachusetts (1883–84)
- Jefferson Laboratory, Harvard University, Cambridge, Massachusetts (1883–84)
- Francis Skinner House, 266 Beacon St, Boston (1886)
- Calumet and Hecla Mining Company office building, (Note: A contributing resource to the Calumet and Hecla Industrial District, NRHP-listed in 1974.) 25970 Red Jacket Rd, Calumet, Michigan (1887)
- Charles Head house, 412 Beacon St, Boston (1887)
- The Cedars, 110 Pond Rd, Wellesley, Massachusetts (1888–91, demolished 1953)
- The Oaks, 866 Washington St, Wellesley, Massachusetts (1891, altered 1937)
- Proctor House, (Note: A contributing resource to the McLean Hospital historic district, NRHP-listed in 2003.) McLean Hospital, Belmont, Massachusetts (1893–95)
- Bowditch House, McLean Hospital, Belmont, Massachusetts (1894–95)
- Free Hospital for Women (former), (Note: A contributing resource to the Pill Hill Historic District, NRHP-listed in 1977.) 60 Glen Rd, Brookline, Massachusetts (1894–95 and 1896)
- The Pines, 828 Washington St, Wellesley, Massachusetts (1894)
- Wyman House, McLean Hospital, Belmont, Massachusetts (1894–95)
- Center Building, McLean Hospital, Belmont, Massachusetts (1895–97)
- Calumet and Hecla Mining Company library, 25947 Red Jacket Rd, Calumet, Michigan (1898)
- Boston Medical Library, 8 Fenway, Boston (1900–01)
- Pierce Hall, Harvard University, Cambridge, Massachusetts (1900–01)

== Published works ==
- George R. Shaw, The Pines of Mexico (Boston: Arnold Arboretum, 1909)
- George R. Shaw, The Genus Pinus (Boston: Arnold Arboretum, 1914)
- George R. Shaw, Knots: Useful and Ornamental (New York: Bonanza Books, 1924)
