= Calumet and Hecla Industrial District =

Historic district in Michigan, United States

- U.S. National Register of Historic Places
- U.S. Historic district
- U.S. Historic district – Contributing property
- Michigan State Historic Site
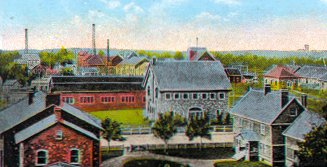
- Calumet & Hecla Industrial Site, c. 1910. Library is in the middleground at center.

- Location within Michigan Location within the United States
- Interactive map
- Location: Roughly bounded by Hecla and Torch Lake RR tracks, Calumet Ave., Mine and Depot Sts., Calumet, Michigan
- Coordinates: 47°14′33″N 88°27′0″W
- Architect: Shaw & Hunnewell et al.
- Part of: Calumet Historic District (ID89001097)
- NRHP reference No.: 74000985

Significant dates
- Added to NRHP: June 28, 1974
- Designated CP: March 28, 1989
- Designated MSHS: November 15, 1973

The Calumet and Hecla Industrial District is a historic district located in Calumet, Michigan and roughly bounded by Hecla & Torch Lake Railroad tracks, Calumet Avenue, Mine and Depot Streets. The district contains structures associated with the copper mines worked by the Calumet and Hecla Mining Company, located along a line above the copper lode, where railroad tracks connected separate mine heads. The Historic District is completely contained in the Calumet Historic District (a National Historic Landmark District) and the Keweenaw National Historical Park. It was designated a Michigan State Historic Site in 1973 and was listed on the National Register of Historic Places in 1974.

== History ==
The copper lode underneath the Calumet and Hecla Industrial District was discovered in 1858 by Edwin J. Hulbert, who immediately garnered investors, bought the property, and established the Hulbert Mining Company. The Hulbert Mining Company had two subsidiaries: the Calumet Mining Company and the Hecla Mining Company. Hulbert began mining operations in the area, but his inexperience resulted in low yields. In 1867, his investors replaced him with Alexander Agassiz. Under Agassiz's management, the Calumet and Hecla mines rapidly increased production, and by 1870 were producing over half of the United States' copper. In 1871, the Calumet and Hecla Mining Companies were consolidated, along with the Scott and Portland Mining Companies, to form the Calumet and Hecla Mining Company.

Agassiz was the president of the newly incorporated company, a position he held until his death in 1910. The company prospered under his leadership; in particular it underwent substantial growth between 1880 and 1910, when most of these buildings currently standing in the district were built. However, after a 1913 mining strike, the company gradually declined, and was weakened further by the onset of the Great Depression. Finally, in 1968, the company was purchased by Universal Oil Products, who closed the Keweenaw mines for good.

== Buildings ==
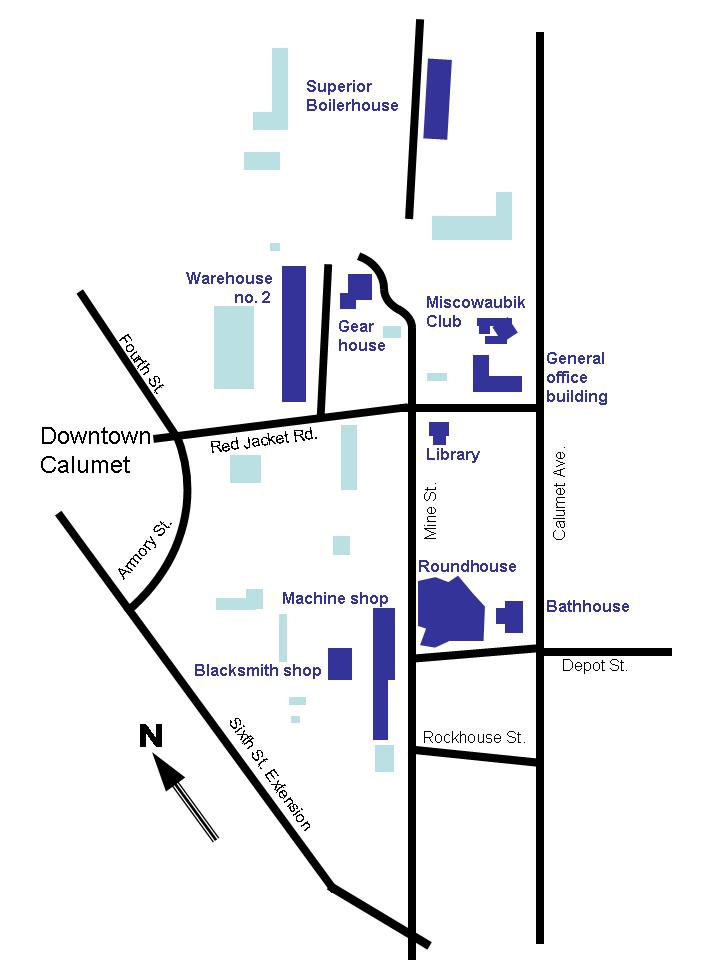
Locations of structures in this historic district. Structures included are in dark blue; other Calumet and Hecla Industrial structures are in light blue.

There are ten buildings in the district: the Machine Shop, the "Blacksmith Shop," (misidentified as such; actually the Pipe Shop), the Roundhouse, Warehouse #2, the Superior Boilerhouse, the Gearhouse, the General Office Building, the Library, the Bathhouse, and the Miscowaubik Club. These structures, constructed primarily during the 1880s, represent the second generation of mine buildings constructed at the site; the earliest structures were destroyed by fire or razed. These buildings are part of a larger industrial complex of mine-related buildings, originally built by the Calumet and Hecla Mining Company, that still stand in the area along Calumet Avenue and Mine Street.

=== Machine Shop (c. 1882) ===
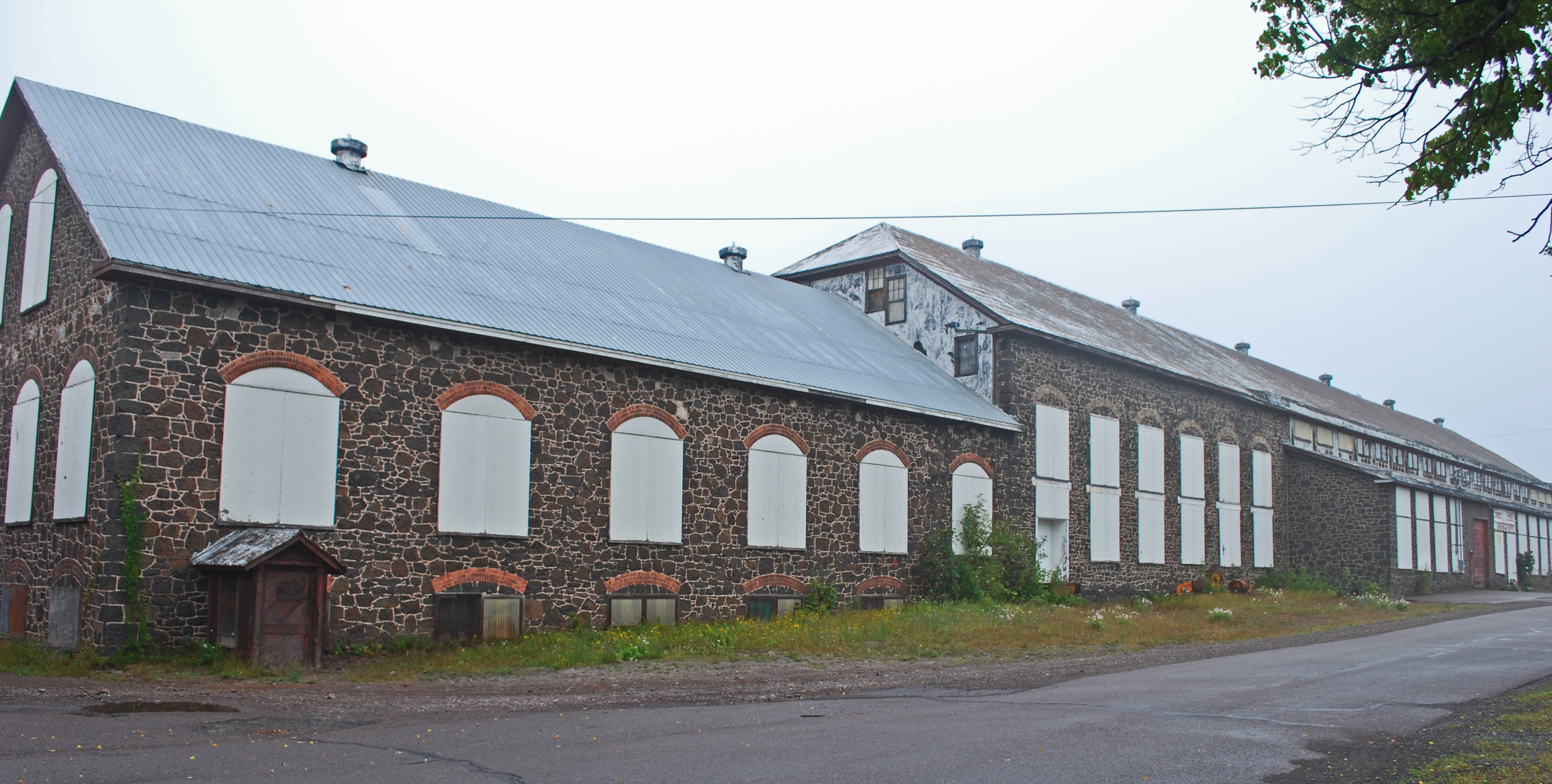
Machine Shop

The machine shop is a two-story structure, 416 feet (127 m) long and 54 feet (16 m) wide, made of coursed mine rock with a hipped gable roof covered in corrugated sheet metal. A clerestory window admits light to the interior, which is floored in concrete. The original machine shop was designed around 1882 by Erasmus D. Leavitt Jr., a consulting engineer with Calumet & Hecla; it was used to repair large equipment, including mining skips and trams. A major reconstruction was performed in 1907, and additions were made in 1911; it is likely that the building in its current form dates entirely from these two years.

=== Blacksmith Shop (Pipe Shop) (1883) ===
The blacksmith shop, built in 1883, is a hipped-roof structure built of rock, measuring 96 feet (29 m) by 54 feet and roofed with corrugated metal. It was originally used as a locomotive house for the narrow gauge Calumet & Hecla railroad. It was later used as a smith shop; an addition was constructed in 1904.

=== Roundhouse (1888) ===
The roundhouse is built of coursed mine rock masonry in the shape of a semicircle with a turntable in the center. The original structure, built in 1888 to service locomotives for the Hecla and Torch Lake Railroad, ran approximately 170 degrees around the turntable, and had twelve train stalls ranging from 75 feet (23 m) deep on the south end and 90 feet (27 m) deep on the north. The structure is built of random mine rock with brick arches over the windows with a shed roof. Train bay doors are spanned with cast iron lintels.

A later addition from 1902 increased the circumferential span of the building by 55 degrees, adding five train bays. In 1907, three additions were made: a small shed and drying house, and a 75 feet (23 m) by 60 feet (18 m) machine shop. The machine shop was roofed by a low gable, and the eaves and construction matched that of the original structure. Finally, in 1928 an 80 feet (24 m) by 37 feet (11 m) storage area.

=== Warehouse #2 ===
Warehouse number 2 was constructed with rail tracks running through it so that large items could be loaded inside.

=== Superior Boilerhouse (1880) ===
The original Superior Boilerhouse, built in 1880, is a 60 feet (18 m) by 77 feet (23 m) structure, constructed of coursed rubble, with a steeply hipped roof and an attached brick smokestack measuring 150 feet (46 m) tall. An addition built in 1895, known as the "New Boilerhouse," measures 154 feet (47 m) by 69 feet. Both the original boilerhouse and the addition were designed by Erasmus D. Leavit, Jr., and were intended to supply steam to the nearby enginehouse.

=== Gearhouse (c. 1890) ===
The gearhouse is constructed from rough sandstone and mine rock with a steeply pitched roof. It measures 78 feet (24 m) by 71 feet (22 m). The structure was first built sometime in the 1880s, but was rebuilt in the 1890s after a disastrous fire. The original use of this building was housing the main pumping engine equipment; however, in 1892 it was converted to use as an electrical power house, and used as such until a new power plant was built in Lake Linden in 1906.

=== General Office Building (c. 1890) ===
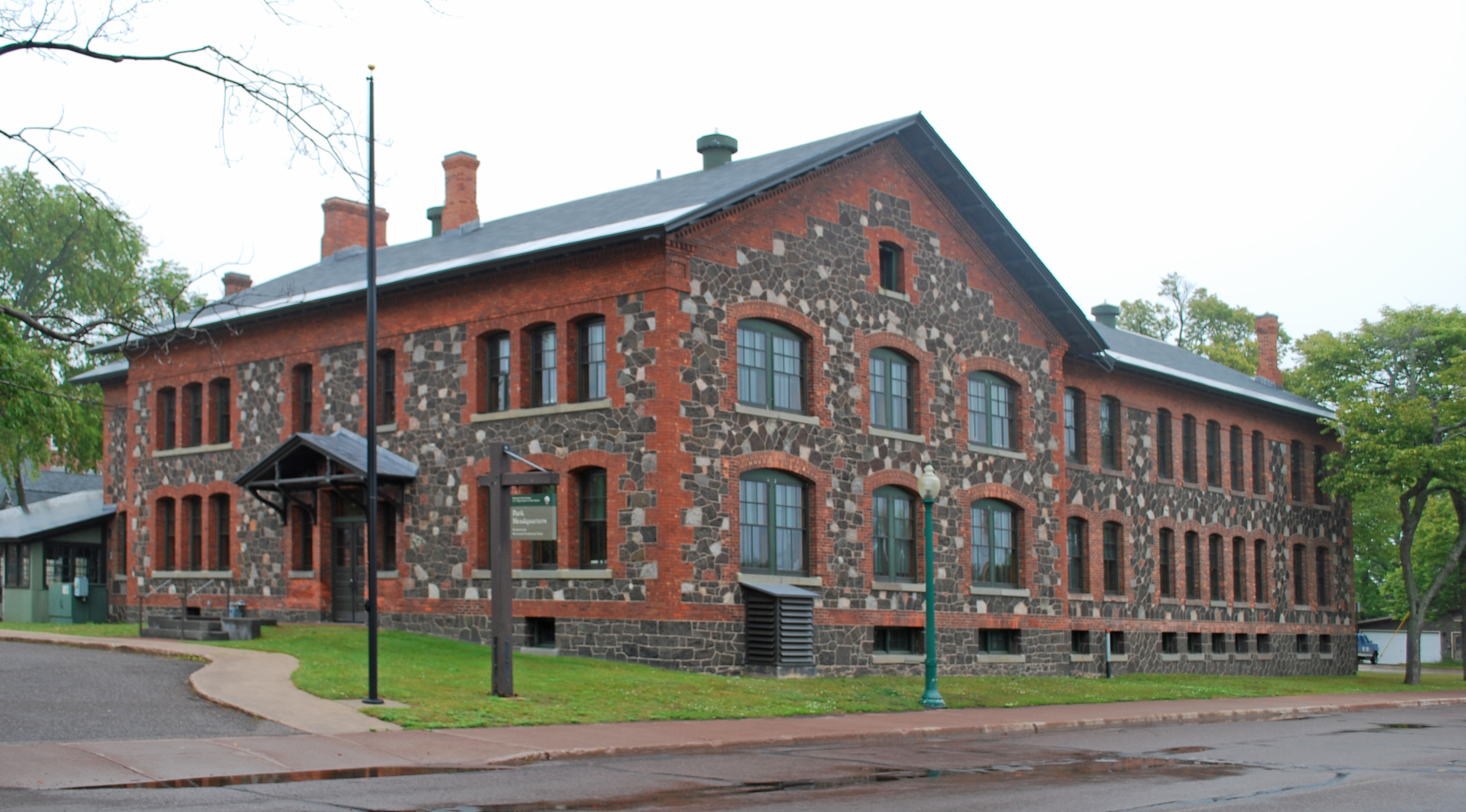
General Office Building, now the Park Headquarters

The General Office Building is a 3 1/2-story office building built of reddish-brown stone trimmed with brick. It was used as a general mine operation center, and also housed engineering and accounting departments. The original building was designed in the early 1890s by the Boston firm of Shaw & Hunnewell; two later additions, architecturally faithful to the original, were designed by the Marquette firm of Charlton & Kuenzli. Of these three sections, the eastern section measures 69 feet (21 m) by 46 feet (14 m), the western section 22 feet (6.7 m) by 30 feet (9.1 m), and the northern section 46 feet (14 m) by 35 feet.

The building currently serves as the headquarters for the Keweenaw National Historical Park.

=== Library (1898) ===
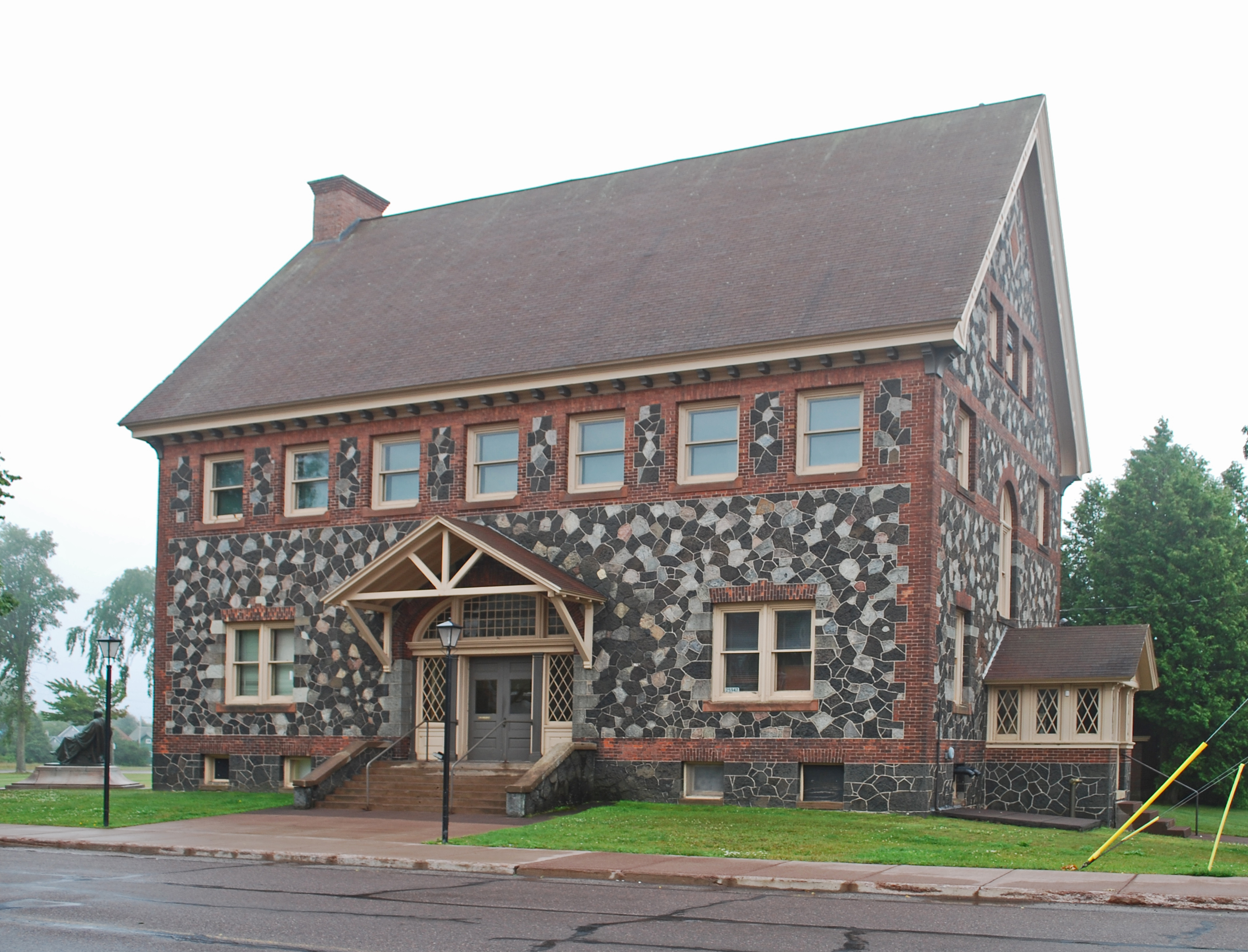
Library, now the Park History Center

Like the office building, the library was designed by Shaw & Hunnewell. The building is two-and-a-half stories high, built of rough masonry trimmed with brick around the windows, and with brick quoins. It is built in a "T" shape, with the main wing measuring 62 feet (19 m) by 42 feet (13 m) and the south wing 38 feet (12 m) by 32 feet. The roof is formed from two intersecting gables covered with dark grey slate.

The building was originally designed to house adult and children's reading rooms on the second floor, library stacks, office space, and cloakrooms on the first floor, and baths for men, women, and children in the basement. Small alterations were made over the next few years, including adding a west entrance porch, reconfiguring the baths, and adding more shelves.

In 1911, a new bathhouse was constructed, and the bath section of the library was remodeled to provide additional stack space. However, as the fortunes of the Calumet & Hecla Mining Company declined, support for the library became difficult. In 1944, the library collection was transferred to the Calumet High School, and the building was converted to office space. The library currently serves as the Keweenaw History Center, housing historical artifacts and archives.

The library is significant as a notable example of the paternalism of corporations at the time, as well as being a striking example of sophisticated design and stonework.

=== Bathhouse (1910) ===
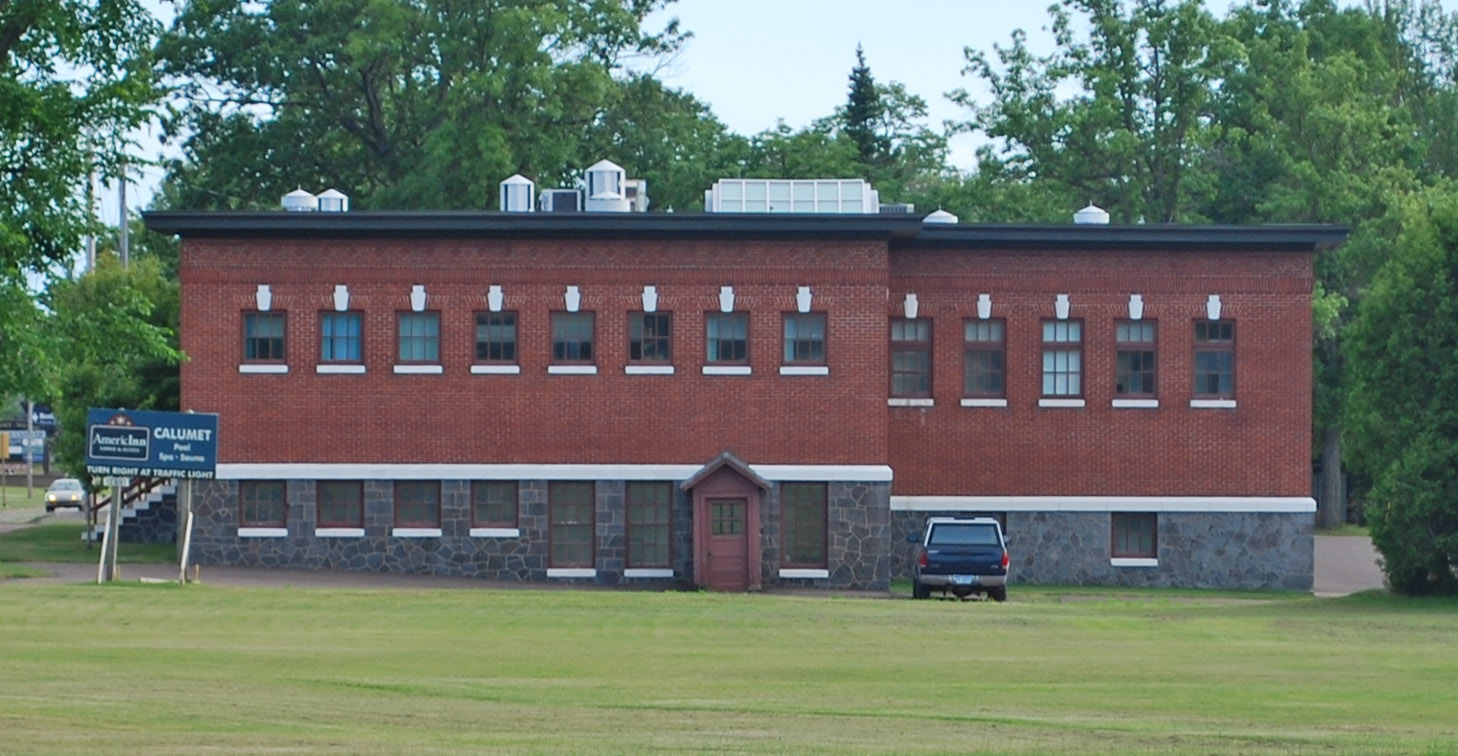
Bathhouse

The bathhouse was constructed in 1910. The building also served as the home of Calumet-based television station WBKP from its sign-on in 1996 until it moved from the area in 2001. The building was purchased in November 2020 by Calumet Electronics and will be renovated to serve as its headquarters.

=== Miscowaubik Club (c. 1875) ===
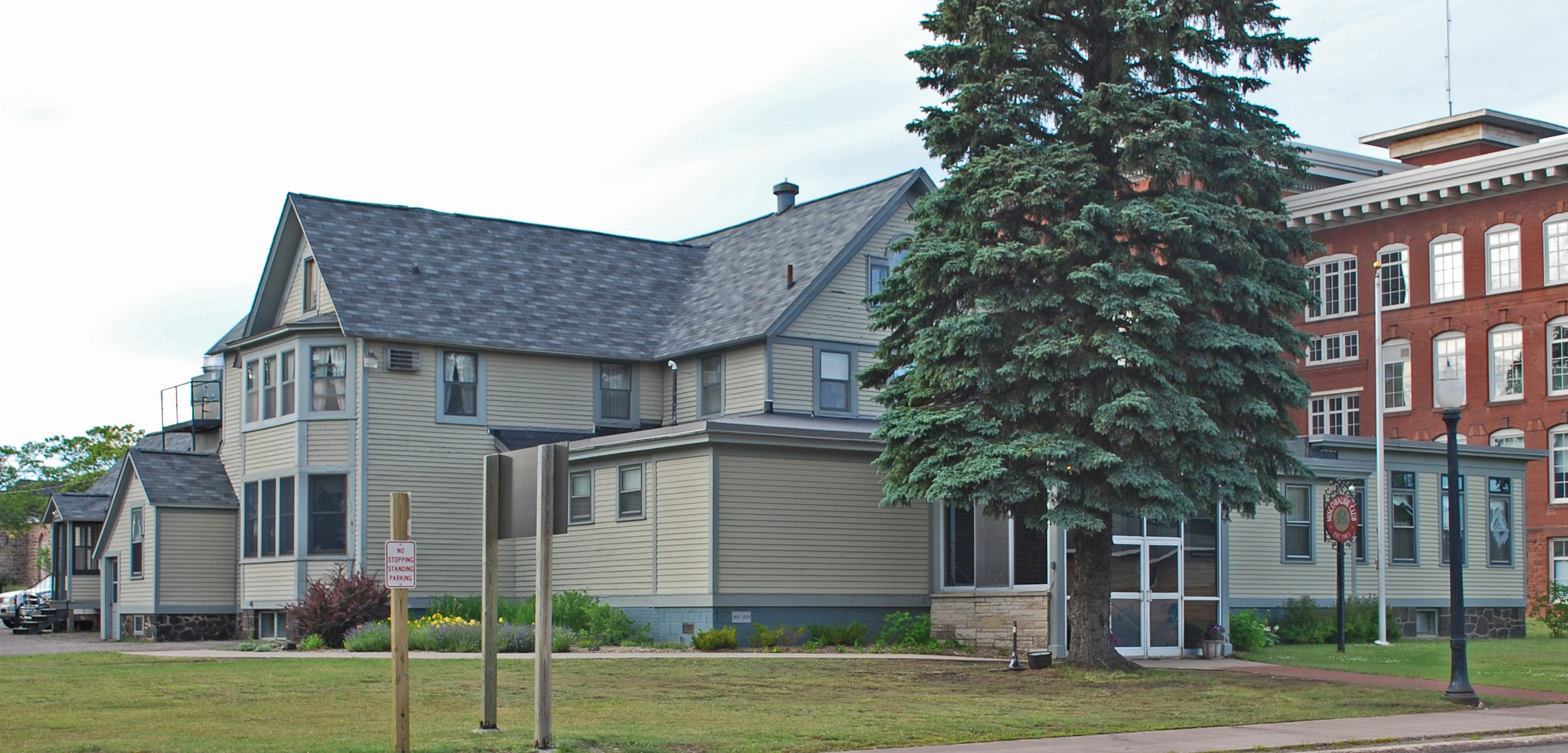
Miscowaubik Club

The Miscowaubik Club was originally built as a private home, reportedly in about 1875 for chief mining engineer Thomas Hoatson. The structure is a 2 1/2-story wood-framed house with a gable roof, measuring 108 feet (33 m) by 83 feet. In 1903, the house was converted into a private club by the firm of Parker, Thomas, and Rice. The house has undergone extensive interior and exterior remodeling.
