= H. H. Hunnewell estate =

Country home of H. H. Hunnewell (1810–1902)

Coordinates: 42.285°N 71.307°W

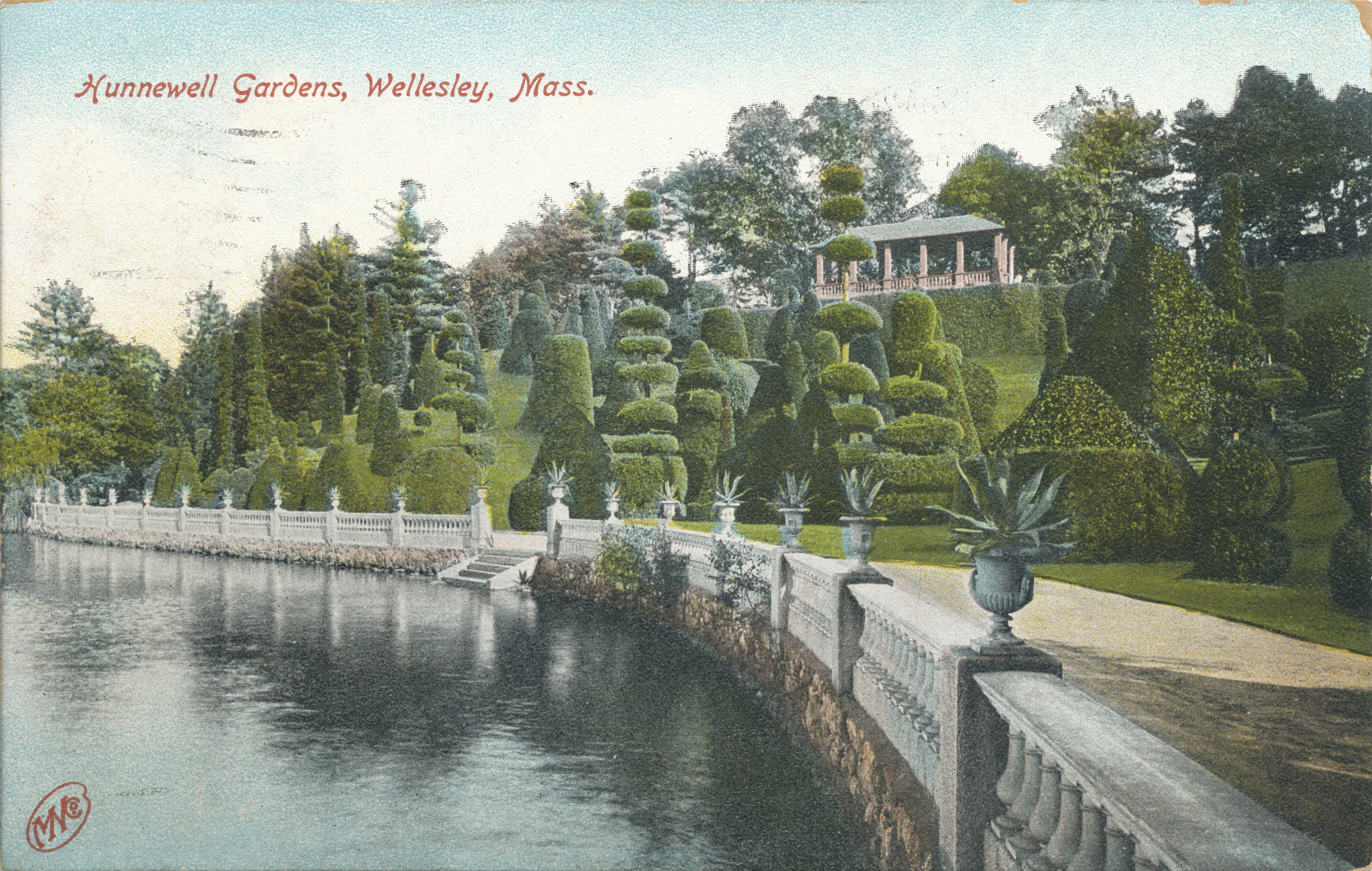
The topiary 'Italian Garden' with view pavilion, in 1909 at the H. H. Hunnewell estate, in Wellesley, Massachusetts.

The H. H. Hunnewell estate in Wellesley, Massachusetts was the country home of H. H. Hunnewell (1810–1902), containing over 500 species of woody plants in 53 families. The estate remains in the family, and includes the first (1854) topiary garden in the United States, featuring intricate geometrically clipped native Eastern white pine and Eastern arborvitae. A collection of specialty greenhouses feature over 1,000 plant species. The estate has been cared for by six generations of the Hunnewell family.

The property is located within the Hunnewell Estates Historic District, on Washington Street in southwest Wellesley, near Boston, Massachusetts.

All of the properties within the district, including the H.H. Hunnewell estate, are private residences and are not open to the public.

== History ==
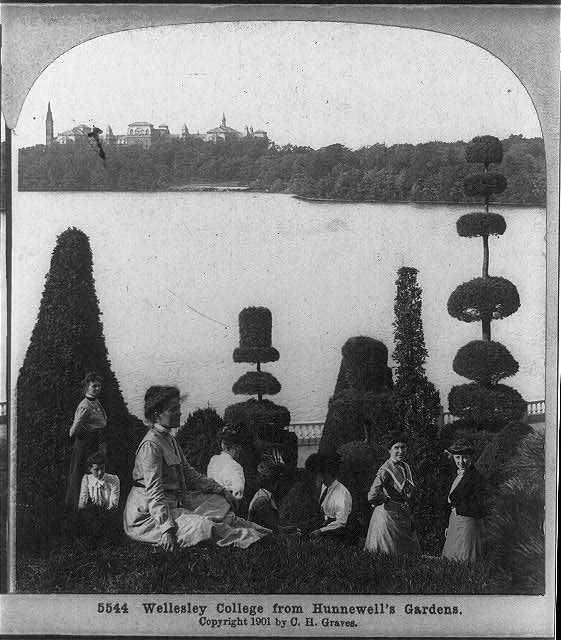
'Italian Garden', with view across Lake Waban to Wellesley College in 1901.

About 1843, H. H. Hunnewell began designing the landscape for his new estate in Wellesley. Mr. Hunnewell took great interest in planting species of evergreens from around the world that had not previously been available in the United States, and from other regions of the country not tested in New England. By 1847 he had over 2,000 trees of over two dozen genera imported from England planted on the grounds. The Italianate residence, designed by Arthur Gilman, was built later in 1851.

The Hunnewell rhododendrons may be the oldest cultivated specimens in the United States, as H. H. Hunnewell started importing and planting them in the 1850s and 1860s on the grounds. Some of these original plants are likely still alive. He staged the first exhibit of large rhododendrons in the U.S., on Boston Common in 1873, which helped to make them popular in American cultivation for gardens and parks.

In 1898 John Muir visited Mr. Hunnewell in the company of Charles S. Sargent, the first director of the Arnold Arboretum. Muir noted in his diary that "Hunnewell planted every tree here since he was 45 (now 88) except one – an oak 250 years old." In 2010 the International Dendrology Society awarded an IDS plaque, its highest honor, to the Hunnewell estate – the first ever for an American garden.

== Pinetum ==
The pinetum, begun in 1867, includes rare, mature specimens of Torreya nucifera (Japanese nutmeg yew), Tsuga canadensis pendula (Sargent's weeping hemlock), Cedrus libani (Cedar of Lebanon), Juniperus formosana (Taiwan juniper), and Metasequoia glyptostroboides (dawn redwood) – one of the oldest specimens in the United States. In front of the 1851 residence is a massive weeping European beech. The collection of specimen trees and shrubs includes towering Pinus strobus (eastern white pine), American white and English Oaks, lindens, tulip trees, bald cypress, and Chinese golden larch, as well as different species and cultivars of azaleas, lilacs, viburnums, hollies, weeping cherries, mountain laurel, and rhododendrons.

The Hunnewell pine, Pinus x hunnewellii, is a hybrid between Eastern white pine and Japanese white pine first raised at the Hunnewell estate in 1952.

Wellesley College Botanic Gardens

The H. H. Hunnewell estate is not to be confused with the H. H. Hunnewell Arboretum in the Wellesley College Botanic Gardens at nearby Wellesley College, located across Lake Waban.

== See also ==
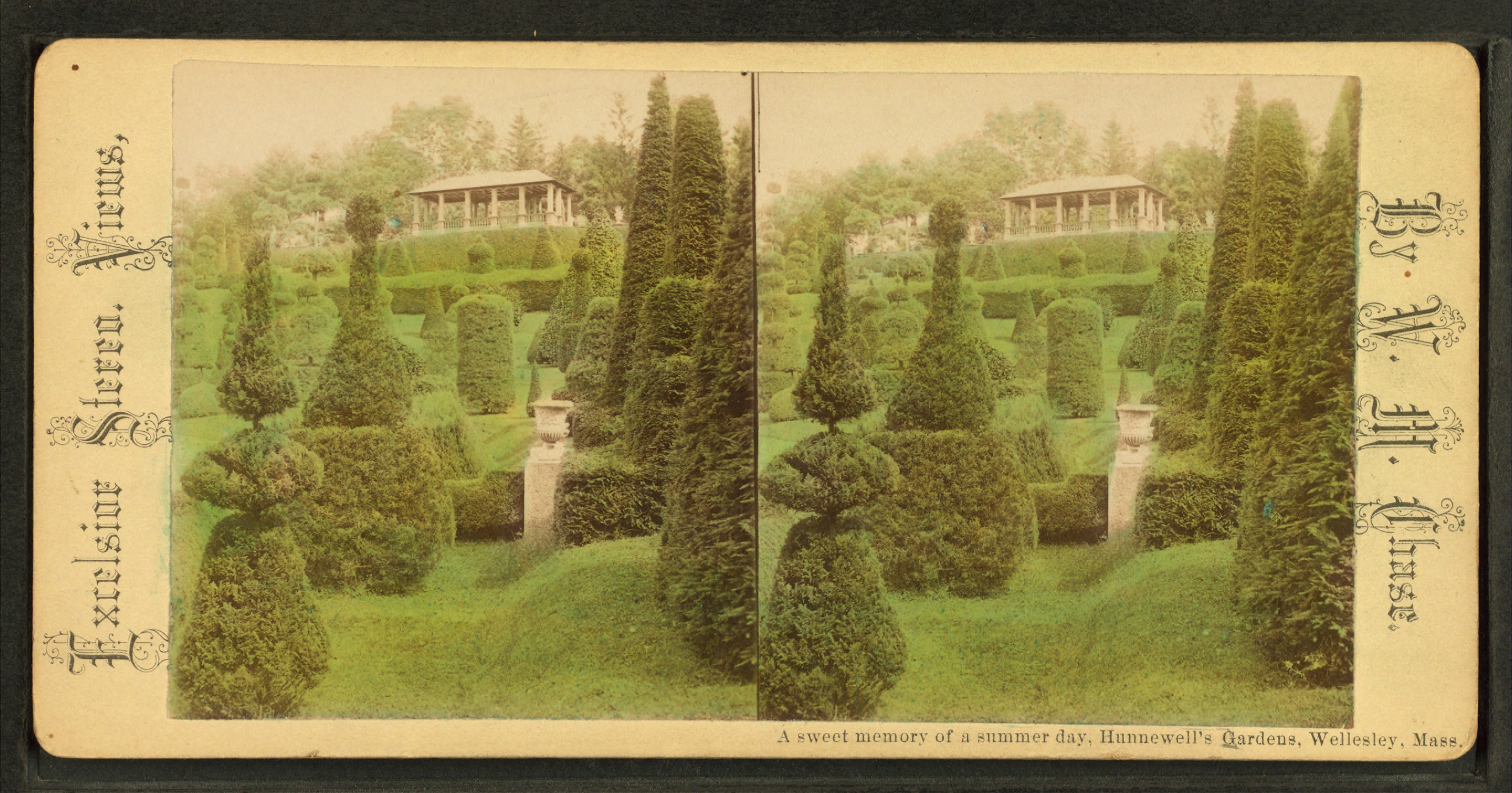
Stereo card of the Italian topiary Garden and pavilion, H. H. Hunnewell Estate, Wellesley.

- Hunnewell Estates Historic District
- Elm Bank Horticulture Center – Massachusetts Horticultural Society headquarters in Wellesley
- Arnold Arboretum – at Harvard University
- National Register of Historic Places listings in Norfolk County, Massachusetts
- Index: Arboreta in Massachusetts
