= Wellesley Town Hall =

- U.S. National Register of Historic Places
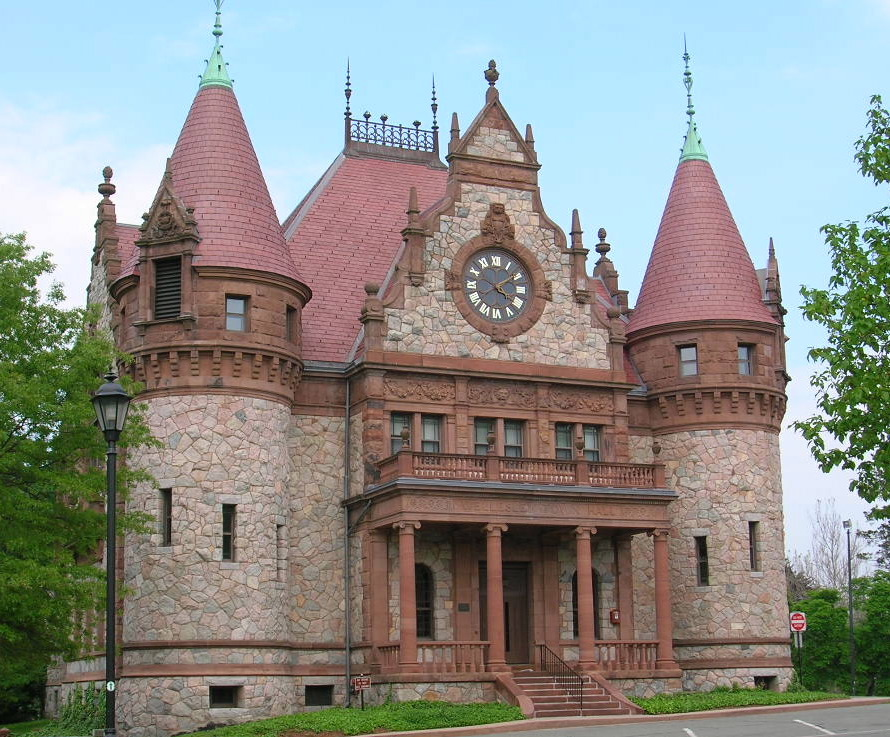

- Location within Massachusetts Location within the United States
- Location: Wellesley, Massachusetts
- Coordinates: 42°17′52″N 71°17′30″W
- Built: 1883
- Architect: Shaw & Hunnewell
- NRHP reference No.: 76000295
- Added to NRHP: April 30, 1976

Wellesley Town Hall is located at 525 Washington Street in Wellesley, Massachusetts. Occupying a prominent location in Hunnewell Park near the town's central business district, this Romanesque stone building was designed by Shaw & Hunnewell and built between 1881 and 1886. Its construction was funded by, and was built on land donated by, H. H. Hunnewell. The east end of the building, which was finished first, was opened as the public library in 1883, the initial collection of which was also funded by Hunnewell. The building is a striking example of the then-fashionable Richardsonian Romanesque, although it also exhibits French Chateau features seen by the architects during travels in Europe.

The building was listed on the National Register of Historic Places in 1976.

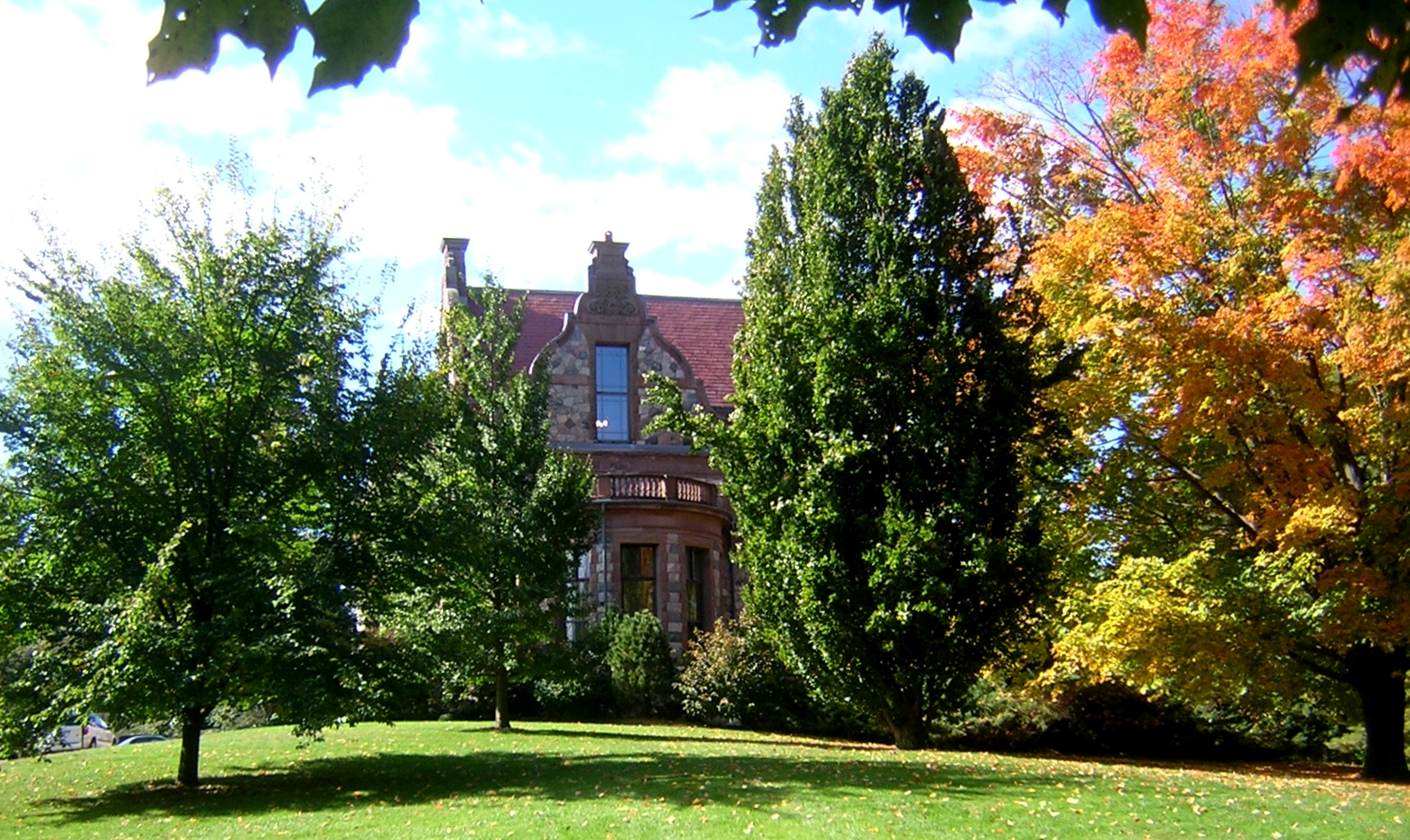
East façade

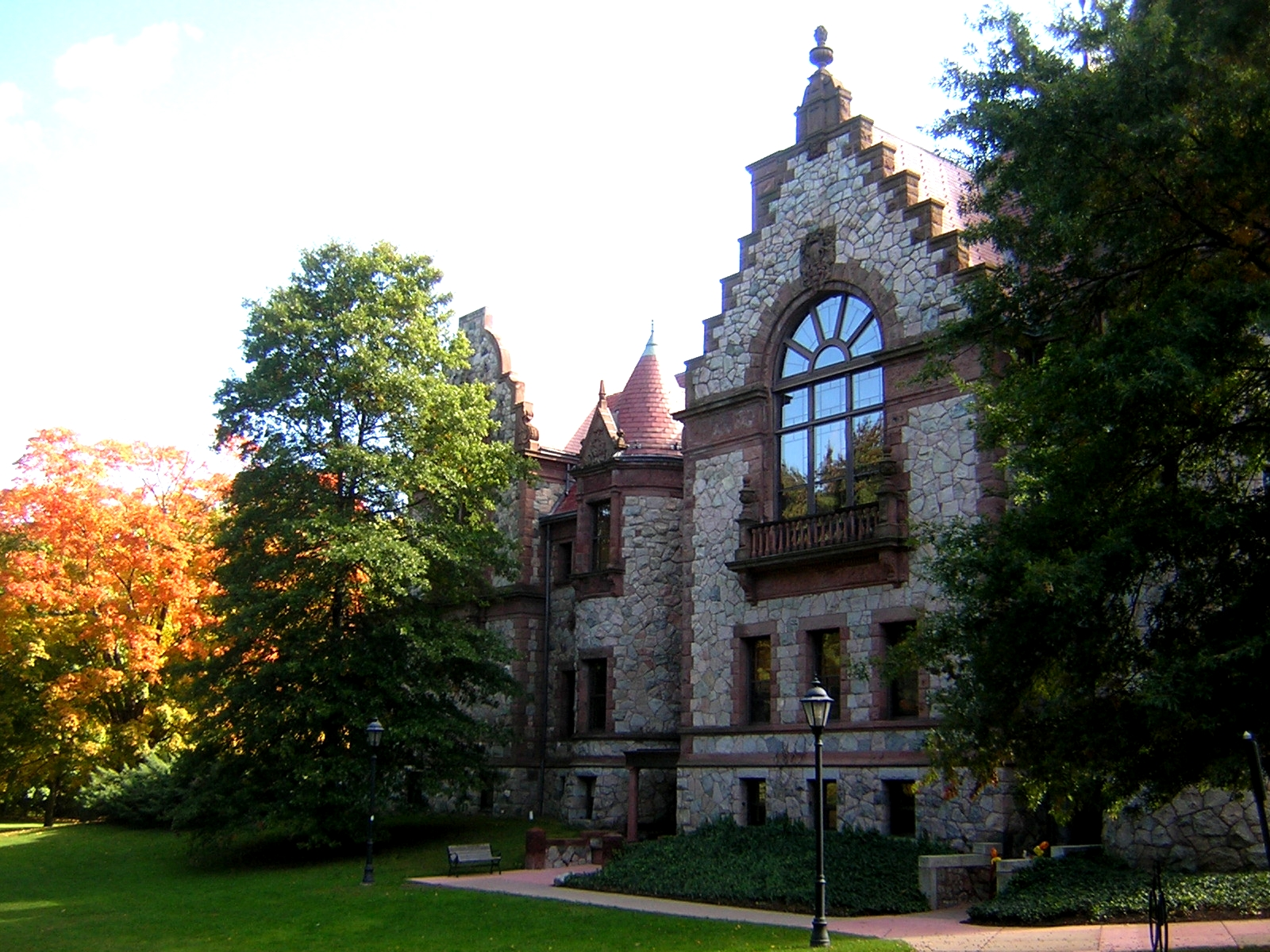
North façade

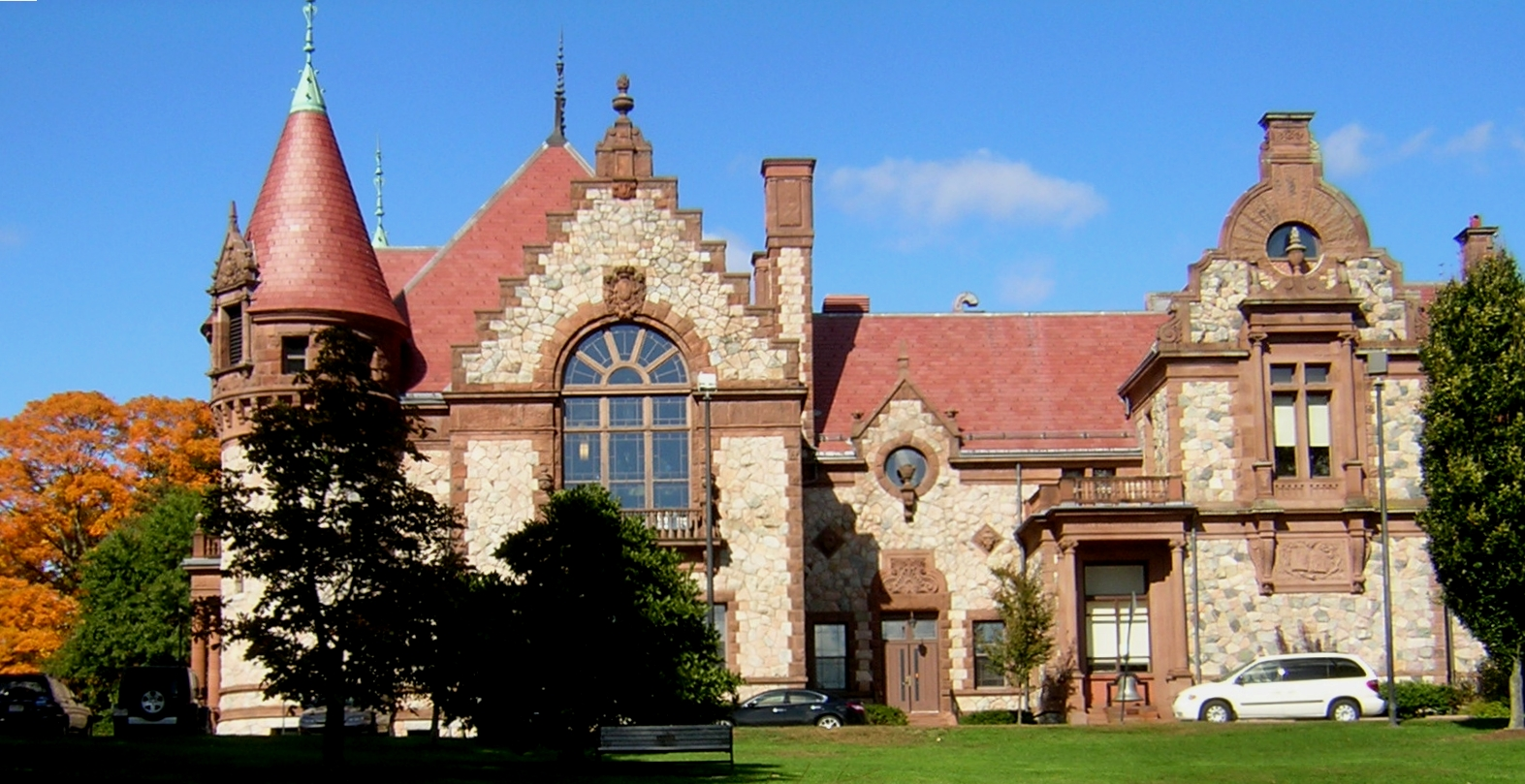
South façade

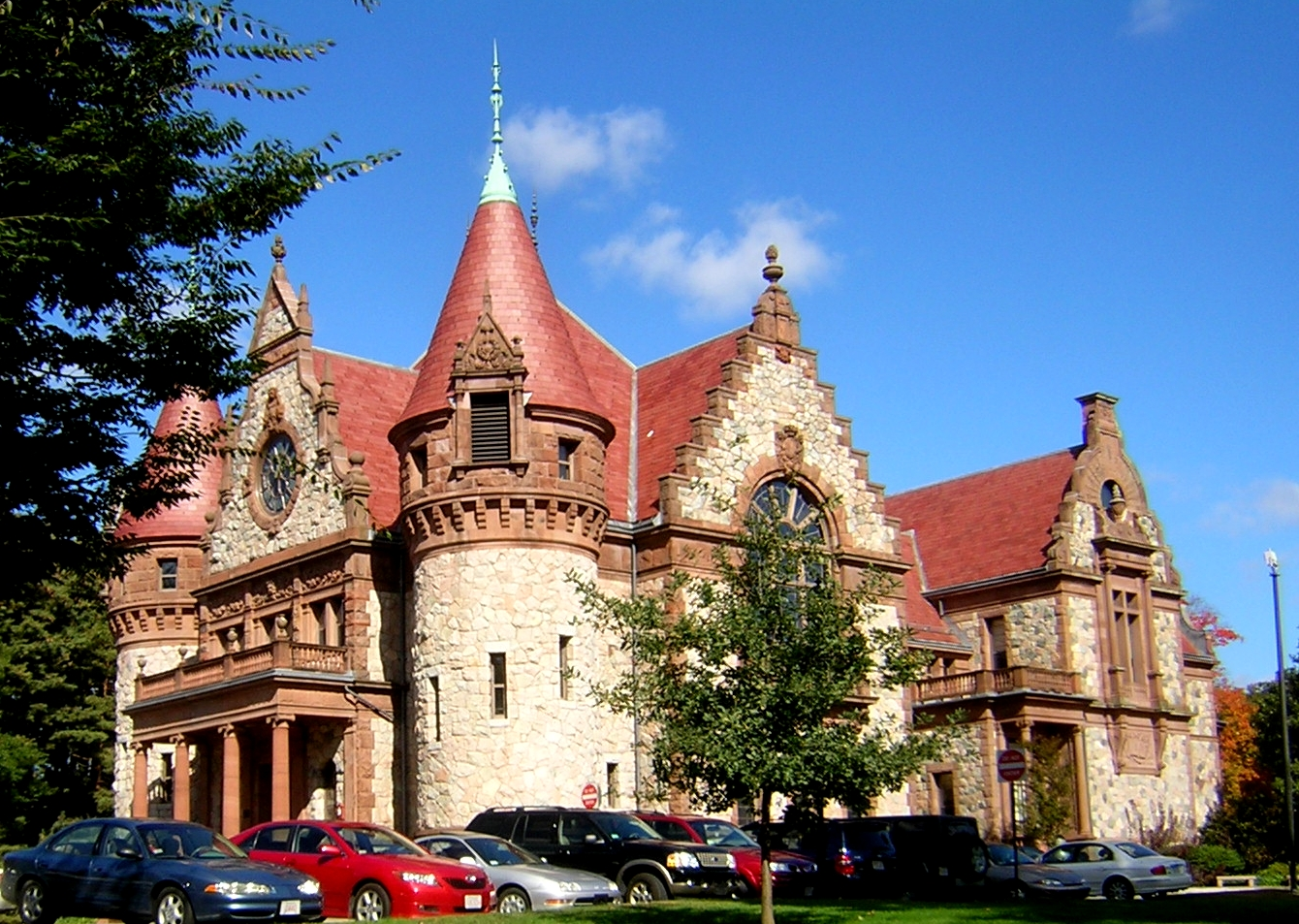
Southwest corner

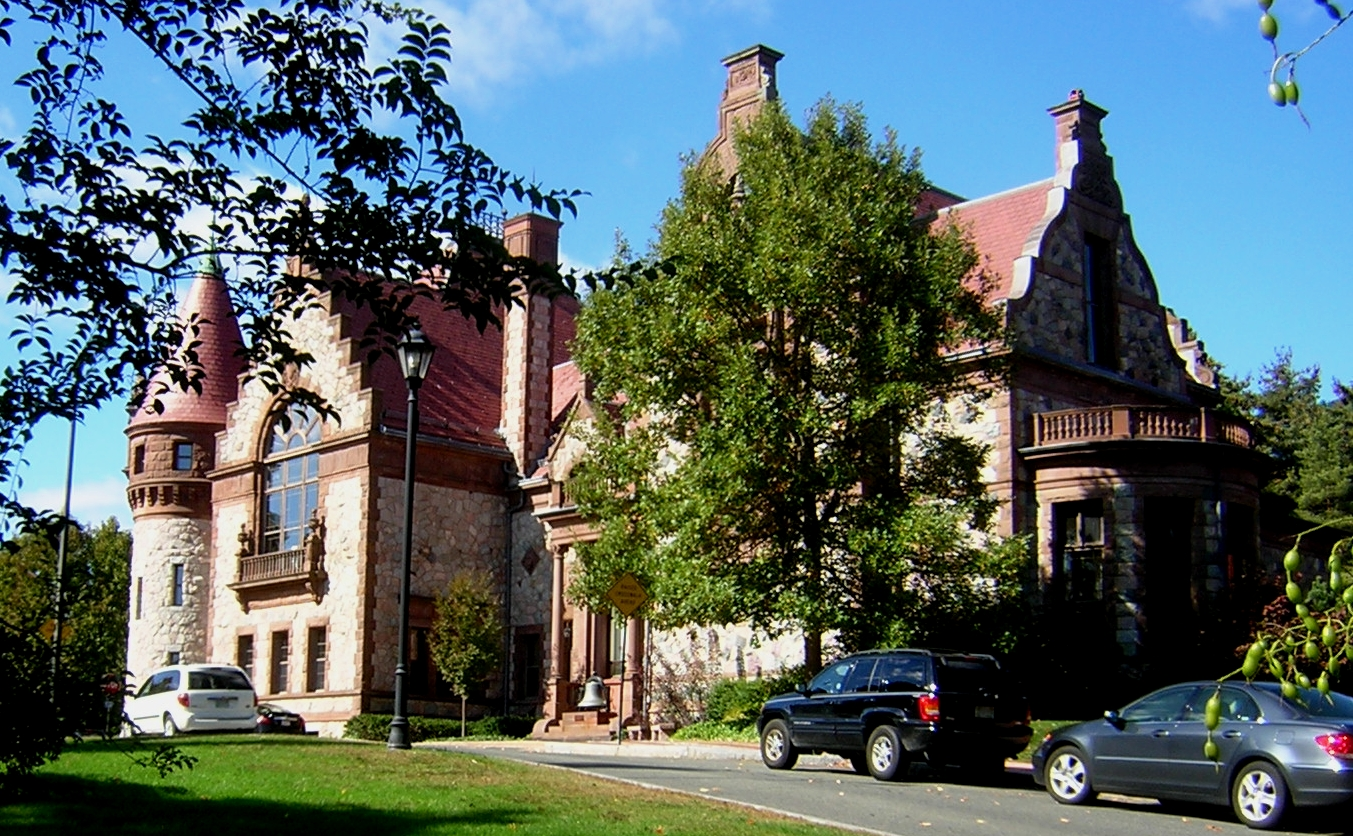
Southeast corner

== See also ==
- National Register of Historic Places listings in Norfolk County, Massachusetts
