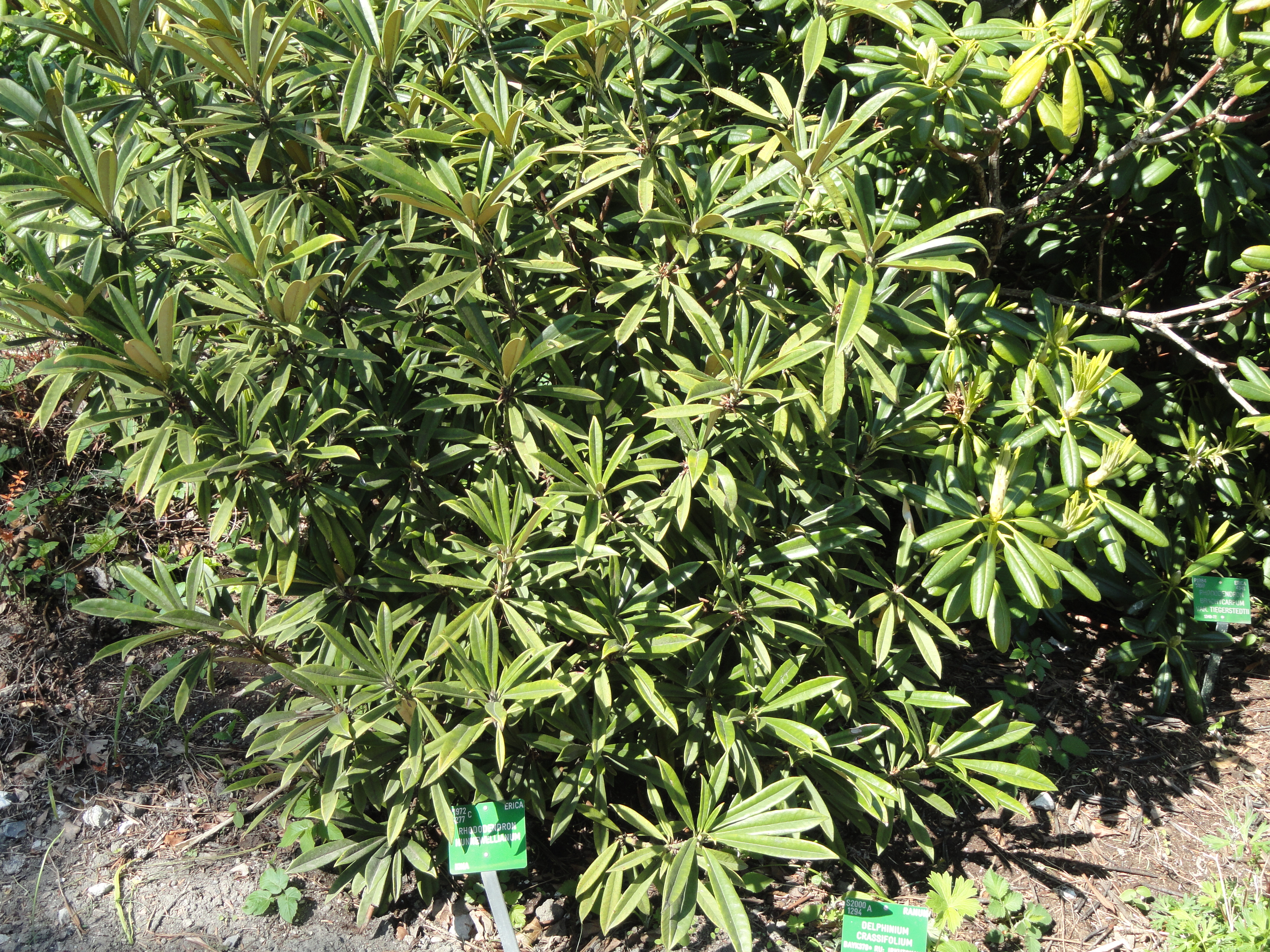

Scientific classification
- Kingdom: Plantae
- Clade: Tracheophytes
- Clade: Angiosperms
- Clade: Eudicots
- Clade: Asterids
- Order: Ericales
- Family: Ericaceae
- Genus: Rhododendron
- Species: R. hunnewellianum

Binomial name
- Rhododendron hunnewellianum Rehder & E.H.Wilson (1913)

= Rhododendron hunnewellianum =

Species of plant

Rhododendron hunnewellianum (岷江杜鹃), named in honor of H. H. Hunnewell and Walter Hunnewell, is a rhododendron species native to southern Gansu and central and northern Sichuan in China, where it grows at altitudes of 1,200–2,400 m (3,900–7,900 ft). It is an evergreen shrub that grows to 2–5 m (6.6–16.4 ft) in height, with leathery leaves that are narrowly lanceolate or narrowly oblanceolate, 7–13 by 1.5–2.8 cm in size. The flowers are pink with darker pink spots.

As it is not entirely hardy, this species tends to be cut back by late frosts, and for the same reason flowers infrequently in colder areas.
