= Wellesley College Botanic Gardens =

Botanic gardens in Wellesley, Massachusetts, U.S.

Coordinates: 42.295°N 71.304°W

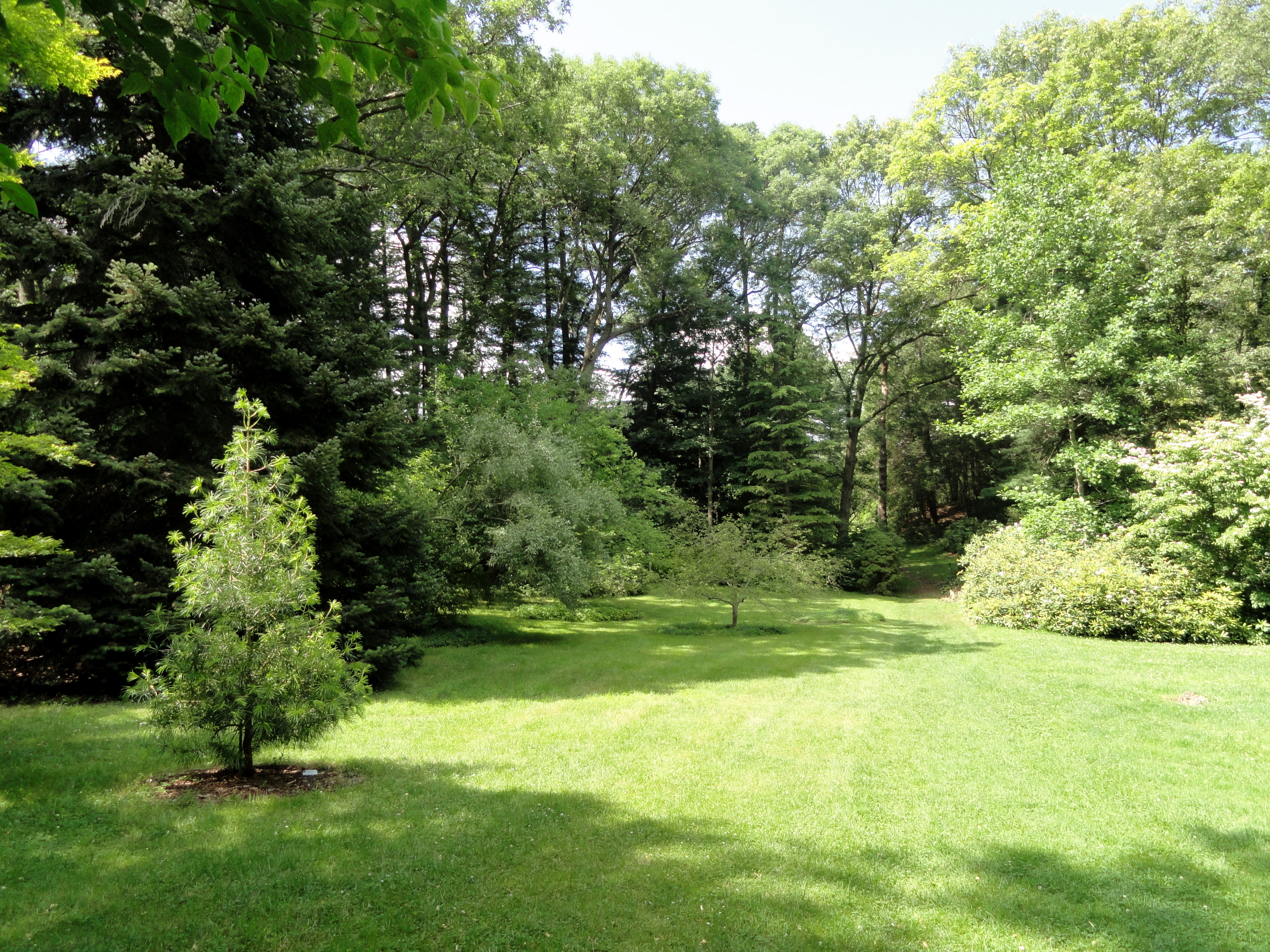
- H. H. Hunnewell Arboretum
- Interactive map of Wellesley College Botanic Gardens
- Website: Official website

The Wellesley College Botanic Gardens are botanical gardens located on the campus of Wellesley College in Wellesley, Massachusetts. The greenhouses and 22 acres of outdoor gardens include thousands of plants representing over 1,500 different taxa from more than 150 different plant families.

== History ==
The Wellesley College Botanic Gardens encompass four gardens, arboretums, or greenhouses:

The H. H. Hunnewell Arboretum dates back to the establishment of the estate in 1852. It was named for Horatio Hollis Hunnewell (1810-1902), a philanthropist, prominent horticulturist, and neighbor of Wellesley College. The arboretum incorporates numerous members of the Ericaceae (Heath) family: rhododendrons and azaleas (Rhododendron spp), andromeda (Pieris japonica), mountain laurel (Kalmia latifolia) and dog-hobble (Leucothoe fontanesiana). Among the notable trees are Fraser fir (Abies fraseri), Japanese maple (Acer palmatum), eastern white pine (Pinus strobus), pitch pine (Pinus rigida) and sawara falsecypress (Chamaecyparis pisifera). The upland woods at the east end of the arboretum is a fragment of the type of mixed oak forest one is likely to find in eastern Massachusetts.

Alexandra Botanic Garden, which was established in the late 19th century, was the first botanical garden collection created for Wellesley College. The garden was named in memory of the six-year-old daughter of Cordenio and Mary Severance (Wellesley College Class of 1885). The garden is home to the most prominent landmark in the collection, Paramecium Pond. A small brook known as the Silver Thread winds through the garden from a waterfall at the east end of the campus and empties into Paramecium Pond. Notable trees include a Kentucky coffee tree (Gymnocladus dioicus), Japanese weeping cherry (Prunus yedoensis 'Shindare yoshino'), tulip tree (Liriodendron tulipifera), dawn redwood (Metasequoia glyptostroboides) and some 300 year old white oaks (Quercus alba) that pre-date the founding of the college.

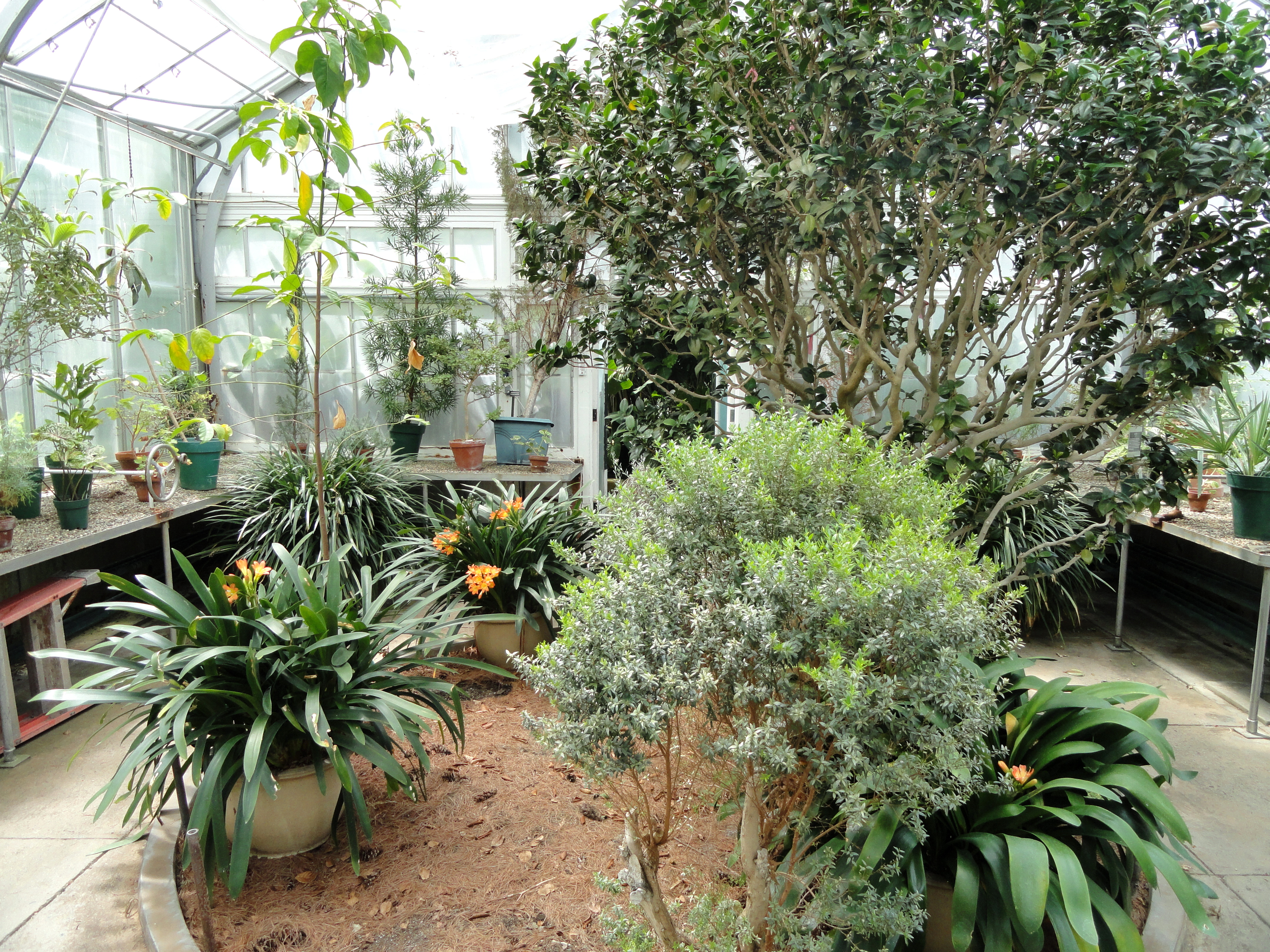
Seasonal Display House in the Margaret C. Ferguson Greenhouses

The Global Flora Conservatory at the Margaret C. Ferguson Greenhouses was named after Margaret Clay Ferguson, a pre-eminent botanist and member of the Wellesley College faculty in the first half of the 20th century. With its highlight on plant form, Global Flora Conservatory carries Margaret Ferguson's vision of "laboratories under glass" into the 21st century. It is a showcase of living beauty highlighting plant form, as well as a new node for interdisciplinary science research and teaching, and an innovative example of sustainable design. In 2017, the Global Flora project won a LafargeHolcim bronze medal, a prestigious international award in sustainable design. The original Ferguson Greenhouses were demolished in 2018 to make way for the Global Flora Conservatory.

In 2011, The Edible Ecosystem Teaching Garden (EETG) was established. Located on the slope below the Whitin Observatory, this designed plant community mimics the properties of a natural ecosystem but produces food and other products useful to humans with a minimum of maintenance. Community planting workdays are held twice a year, in spring and early fall. The overall design concept is a "bowl of fruit," with taller tree species fringing the swamp and dwarf trees planted closer to the observatory. This design allows for unrestricted sight lines from the telescopes even as the garden matures. Among the specific habitats are a nut grove, fruit woodland, and a fruit thicket.

During the Wellesley College Science Center construction project, which ended in 2021, the Global Flora Conservatory was temporarily closed. The Global Flora Conservatory has since been reopened to members of the Wellesley College community.
