= Hunnewell, Missouri =

- City
- Location of Hunnewell, Missouri
- Coordinates: 39°40′1″N 91°51′34″W
- Country: United States
- State: Missouri
- County: Shelby

Area
  - Total: 0.62 sq mi (1.60 km^{2})
  - Land: 0.62 sq mi (1.60 km^{2})
  - Water: 0 sq mi (0.00 km^{2})
- Elevation: 755 ft (230 m)

Population (2020)
  - Total: 139
  - Density: 225.5/sq mi (87.07/km^{2})
- Time zone: UTC-6 (Central (CST))
  - Summer (DST): UTC-5 (CDT)
- ZIP code: 63443
- Area code: 573
- FIPS code: 29-33760
- GNIS feature ID: 0719996

Hunnewell is a city in southeastern Shelby County, Missouri, United States. The population was 139 at the 2020 census.

== History ==
Hunnewell was platted in 1857. The community was named for Boston financer and railroad promoter H. H. Hunnewell. A post office called Hunnewell has been in operation since 1880.

== Geography ==
Hunnewell is located in the southeast corner of Shelby County adjacent to US Route 36. Monroe City in adjacent Monroe County is approximately 6.5 miles to the east and Shelbina is nine miles to the west along Route 36. The Hunnewell Lake Conservation Area is two miles to the north and the North Fork of the Salt River flows past two miles to the west.

According to the United States Census Bureau, the city has a total area of 0.62 square miles (1.61 km^{2}), all land.

== Demographics ==
Historical population
Census	Pop.	Note	%±
1870	327		—
1880	424		29.7%
1890	427		0.7%
1900	473		10.8%
1910	406		−14.2%
1920	348		−14.3%
1930	342		−1.7%
1940	312		−8.8%
1950	293		−6.1%
1960	284		−3.1%
1970	304		7.0%
1980	235		−22.7%
1990	219		−6.8%
2000	227		3.7%
2010	184		−18.9%
2020	139		−24.5%
U.S. Decennial Census

=== 2010 census ===
As of the census of 2010, there were 184 people, 82 households, and 59 families residing in the city. The population density was 296.8 inhabitants per square mile (114.6/km^{2}). There were 97 housing units at an average density of 156.5 per square mile (60.4/km^{2}). The racial makeup of the city was 98.9% White, 0.5% Native American, and 0.5% from two or more races. Hispanic or Latino of any race were 2.2% of the population.

There were 82 households, of which 31.7% had children under the age of 18 living with them, 48.8% were married couples living together, 12.2% had a female householder with no husband present, 11.0% had a male householder with no wife present, and 28.0% were non-families. 23.2% of all households were made up of individuals, and 11% had someone living alone who was 65 years of age or older. The average household size was 2.24 and the average family size was 2.59.

The median age in the city was 41 years. 19.6% of residents were under the age of 18; 10.3% were between the ages of 18 and 24; 24.4% were from 25 to 44; 27.7% were from 45 to 64; and 17.9% were 65 years of age or older. The gender makeup of the city was 53.3% male and 46.7% female.

=== 2000 census ===
As of the census of 2000, there were 227 people, 95 households, and 62 families residing in the city. The population density was 358.3 inhabitants per square mile (138.3/km^{2}). There were 112 housing units at an average density of 176.8 per square mile (68.3/km^{2}). The racial makeup of the city was 90.31% White, 8.37% African American, and 1.32% from two or more races. Hispanic or Latino of any race were 0.44% of the population.

There were 95 households, out of which 31.6% had children under the age of 18 living with them, 49.5% were married couples living together, 12.6% had a female householder with no husband present, and 33.7% were non-families. 30.5% of all households were made up of individuals, and 8.4% had someone living alone who was 65 years of age or older. The average household size was 2.39 and the average family size was 3.03.

In the city the population was spread out, with 26.4% under the age of 18, 6.2% from 18 to 24, 30.0% from 25 to 44, 20.3% from 45 to 64, and 17.2% who were 65 years of age or older. The median age was 38 years. For every 100 females there were 110.2 males. For every 100 females age 18 and over, there were 106.2 males.

The median income for a household in the city was $24,861, and the median income for a family was $31,429. Males had a median income of $28,750 versus $22,500 for females. The per capita income for the city was $12,985. About 13.2% of families and 15.9% of the population were below the poverty line, including 23.9% of those under the age of eighteen and 10.0% of those 65 or over.
