= Pill Hill Historic District =

Historic district in Massachusetts, United States

- U.S. National Register of Historic Places
- U.S. Historic district
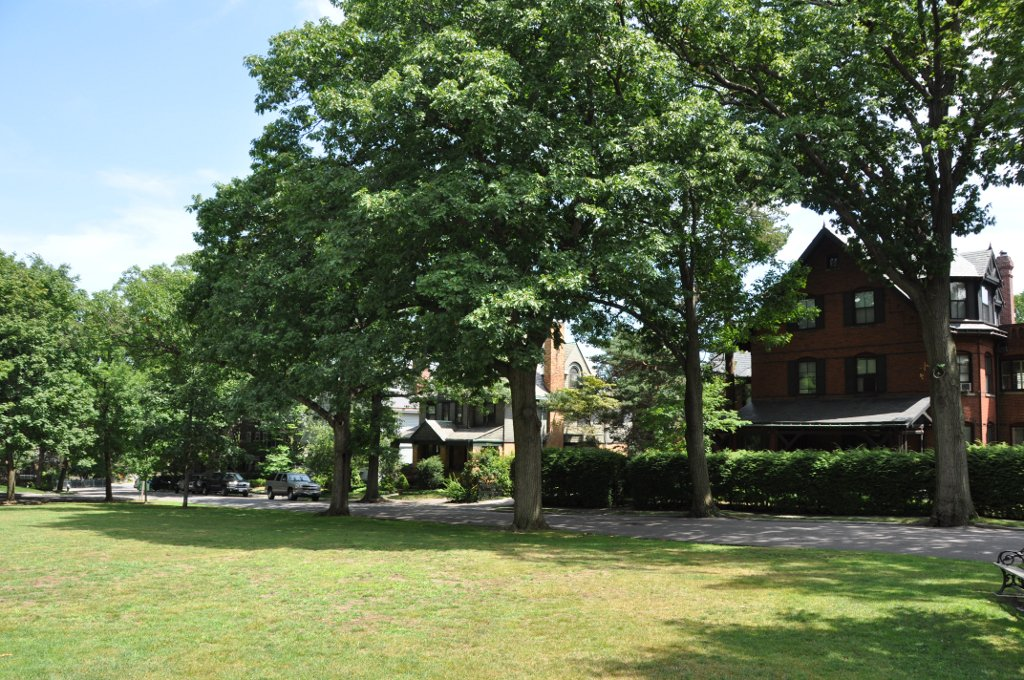
- Philbrick Common

- Location within Massachusetts Location within the United States
- Location: Roughly bounded by Boylston St., Pond Ave., Acron, Oakland and Highland Rds., Brookline, Massachusetts
- Coordinates: 42°19′41″N 71°7′14″W
- Built: 1840
- Architect: Multiple
- Architectural style: Greek Revival, Stick/Eastlake, Queen Anne
- NRHP reference No.: 77000187
- Added to NRHP: December 16, 1977

The Pill Hill Historic District is a historic district roughly bounded by Boylston Street, Pond Ave., and Acron, Oakland and Highland Roads in Brookline, Massachusetts.

== History ==
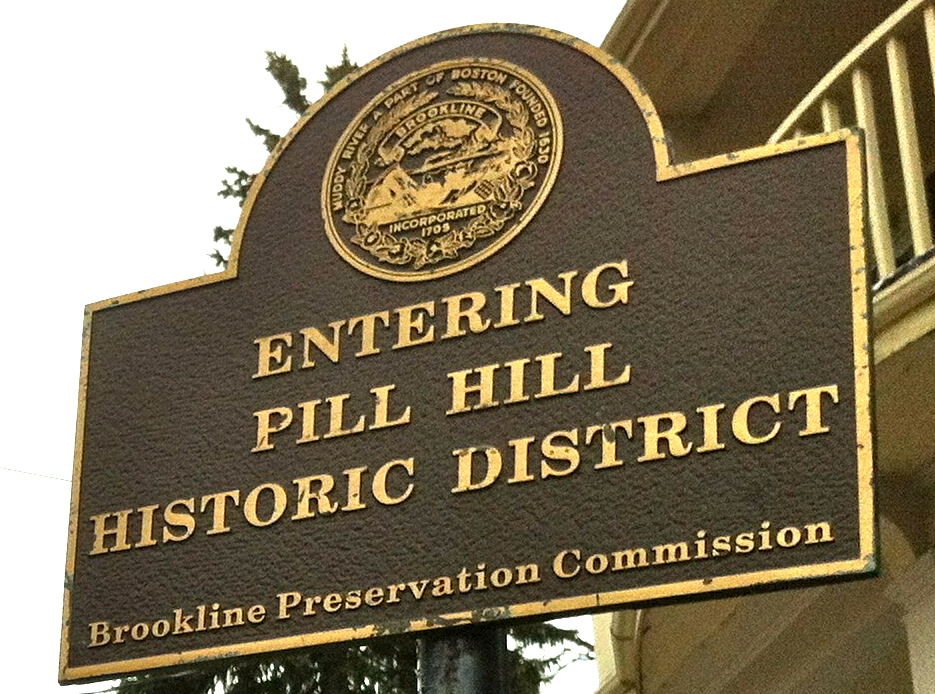

The district, which is mainly residential, was developed in the mid-19th century for an upper-middle class professional population. Commuter railroads connecting Brookline to Boston opened in 1848, making the town attractive for working professionals who wished to live in a more open suburban area. Several major Boston architects designed homes in the district, including Robert Swain Peabody, Walter H. Kilham, Ware & Van Brunt, and William Ralph Emerson. By the 1880s, a significant number of doctors had settled in the district, giving it its current name. Dr. Walter Channing, one of the doctors living in the district, established one of Boston's earliest women's hospitals; his efforts inspired Brookline's Free Hospital for Women, which moved to Pill Hill in 1895.

The district was added to the National Register of Historic Places in 1977.

== See also ==
- National Register of Historic Places listings in Brookline, Massachusetts
