= Hunnewell Estates Historic District =

Historic district in Massachusetts, United States

- U.S. National Register of Historic Places
- U.S. Historic district
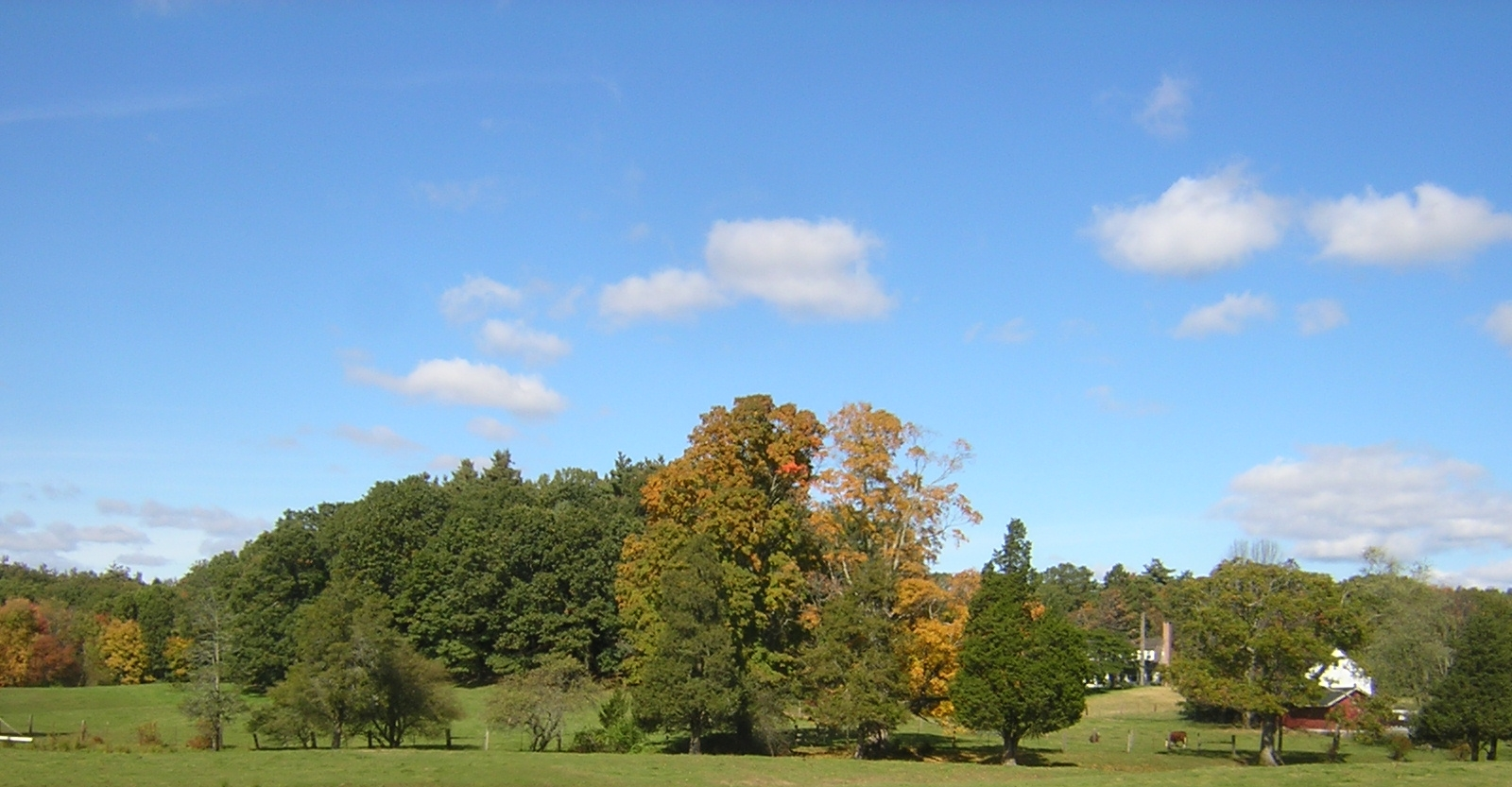
- View of fields and pastures at Hunnewell Farm, Pond Road and Washington Street.

- Location within Massachusetts Location within the United States
- Location: Wellesley, Massachusetts
- Coordinates: 42°16′48″N 71°18′30.5″W
- Built: 1770 to 1891
- Architect: Arthur Gilman; John Sturgis; Gridley J.F. Bryant; Ware & Van Brunt; Stanford White; Shaw & Hunnewell
- Architectural style: Colonial, Italianate, Colonial Revival, Late Victorian, 19th & 20th Century Revivals.
- NRHP reference No.: 88000438
- Added to NRHP: April 14, 1988

The Hunnewell Estates Historic District is an historic district between the Charles River and Lake Waban in Wellesley and Natick, Massachusetts, about 17 miles west of Boston. It consists of the large group of 18th to 21st century agricultural and estate properties with farmland, gardens, residences, and landscapes of the Hunnewell and Welles families. The properties in the Historic District are still largely owned and occupied by members of the Hunnewell family. It was added to the National Register of Historic Places in 1988.

All of the properties within the district are private residences, and are not open to the public.

== History ==
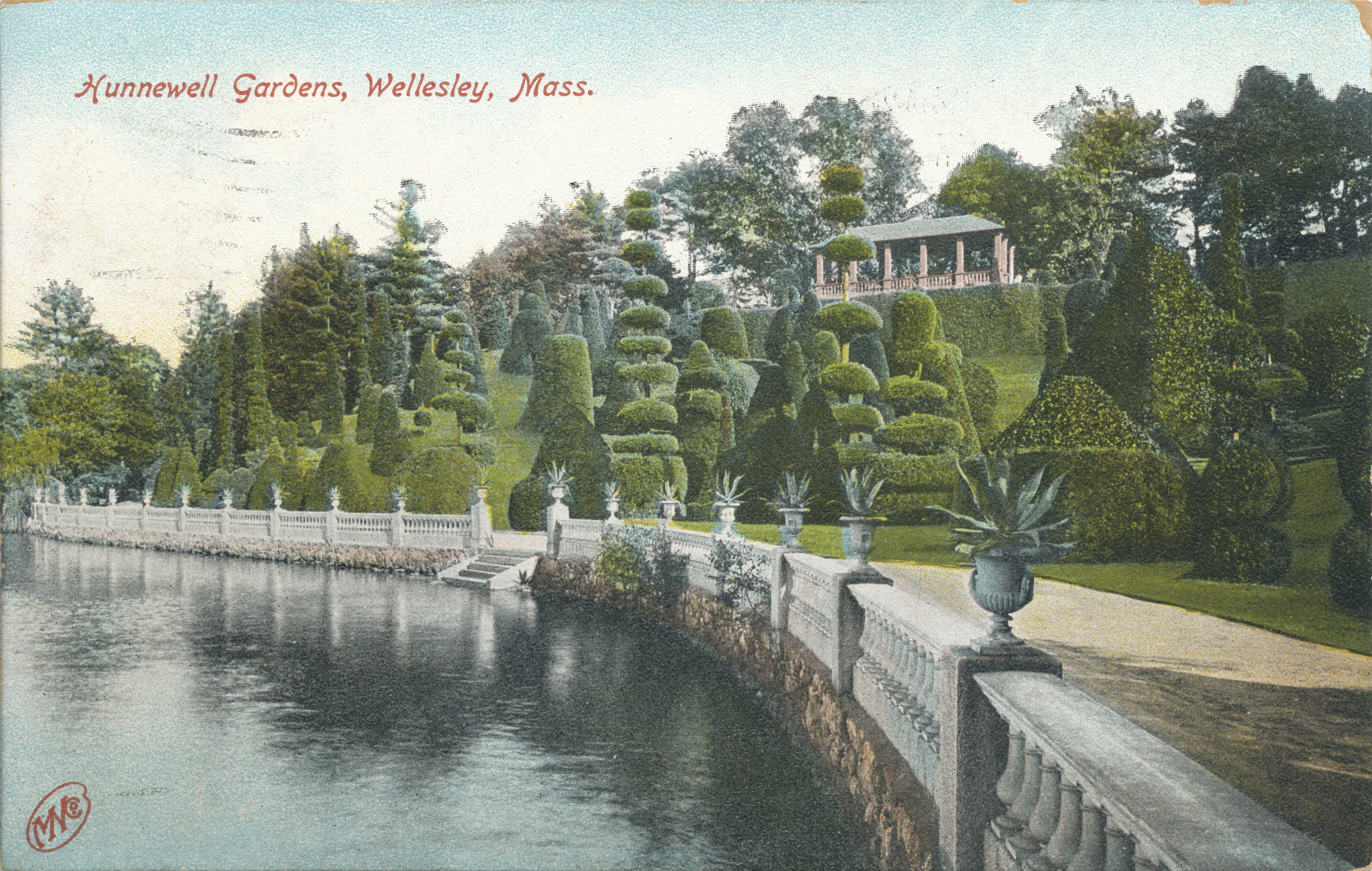
Topiary 'Italian Garden' on the H.H. Hunnewell estate circa 1909.

The origin of the Hunnewell estates dates to 1763 when Samuel Welles (1725-1799) made his first purchase of Indian lands in Natick and West Needham (later Wellesley). Welles was a descendant of Thomas Welles (1594-1660), 1st Treasurer and then Governor of the Colony of Connecticut. The properties descended to Samuel's granddaughter Isabella Pratt Welles and her husband, successful railroad financier and businessman, landscape designer, and horticulturalist H. Hollis Hunnewell (1810-1902), and continued with their adult children and the following generations. Mr. Hunnewell and his family gave much to the town of Wellesley (formerly West Needham), which was named after his wife's family - the Welles, and to Boston, with civic philanthropy in numerous fields.

They also were generous to the New England horticulture community for over 75 years via importing, testing, and distributing many new plant introductions, estate site planning and garden design examples, and supportive leadership in the Massachusetts Horticultural Society. Horatio Hollis Hunnewell was especially interested in coniferous and broad-leaved evergreens, and Asian rhododendrons.

At their peak during the early 20th century 'American Country Place' era, there were twenty contiguous Hunnewell estates along Washington Street and Pond Road in southwest Wellesley. The estates have now been in the Welles-Hunnewell family for eight generations.

== Conservation ==
The family has placed hundreds of acres in the district under perpetual conservation restrictions, primarily with The Trustees of Reservations, protecting Lake Waban and the Charles River, as well as the farmland, gardens, landscapes, vistas, and natural native landscapes from development. These restrictions, starting in 1974, were among the first placed with the Trustees of Reservations.

None of the properties are open to the public. However, while maintaining its property rights in this regard, the family until March 2020 had traditionally allowed members of the neighboring Wellesley College community to enter the properties to walk the private path around Lake Waban. Then, consistent with the closure of the Wellesley College campus to the public in March 2020 due to the Covid-19 pandemic, the lakeside path on the properties was also temporarily closed. Most recently, after a brief reopening of the trail and for reasons unrelated to the Covid-19 pandemic, chain link fences were constructed in December 2021 by Wellesley College blocking trail access on both sides of the Hunnewell property, preventing walkers from traversing the Hunnewells' rhododendron grove, obtaining a closeup view of the topiary gardens and circumnavigating Lake Waban.

== Historic district ==
The district includes the original Welles homestead, the Hunnewell Farm, and the eight contiguous country houses and outbuildings H. H. Hunnewell built for himself and seven of his nine children:

- "Hunnewell Farm" (1765) - 30 acre working farm on the Natick/Wellesley line, purchased by John Welles in 1814, though farmed since colonial times. The splendid barn, with a main structure measuring 90' x 40' and a 10,000 bale capacity in the haylofts, was built in 1887.
- "Welles House" (1770) - Colonial style original country homestead of the Welles family of Boston and Paris.
- "H. H. Hunnewell estate" (1851) - Italianate style residence of H. H. Hunnewell (1810-1902) and his wife Isabella Pratt Welles, designed by Arthur Gilman, and including renowned lakeside Italian Garden (1854), the first topiary garden in the United States, and Pinetum (1867). In 1865-1866, two gate lodges were built and a large conservatory was added to the residence, all designed by Gridley J.F. Bryant. In addition to these and other outbuildings, the estate includes the 1755 house of Captain Aaron Smith, who led a company of 70 Minutemen to the Battles of Lexington and Concord. Mr. Hunnewell was his own landscape architect and did not employ a professional firm to lay out his grounds; his original design is essentially completely intact.
- "The Cottage" (1870) - Queen Anne style guest cottage, designed by John Sturgis, and including 1923 landscape design by the Olmsted Brothers.
- "The Oaks" (1871) - residence of Arthur Hunnewell (1845-1904), designed by John Sturgis, burned in 1891, and replaced with a new residence designed by Shaw & Hunnewell, with first private golf course in New England (1892), in use until World War II.
- "Walter Hunnewell House" (1875) - Stick style residence of Walter Hunnewell (1844-1921), designed by Ware & Van Brunt and including many of the same elements as their design for Memorial Hall at Harvard, which was designed and built contemporaneously. In 1881 Stanford White redesigned the front entry and one interior room.
- "Hill Hurst" (1883) - brick Château style residence of Hollis Hunnewell (1836-1884), designed by Shaw & Hunnewell, and including 1892 squash courts, being the first of their kind in the United States. The house served as a filming location for the 2019 film Knives Out.
- "The Cedars" (1891) - residence of Henry Sargent Hunnewell (1854-1931), designed by Shaw & Hunnewell, and including a large landscape designed by Charles Eliot and organized around long directed 'view avenues' to Morse's Pond and other features. The original house was pulled down in 1953 and replaced with the current brick house in 1954.
- "The Morrill House" (1775) - residence of Dr. Isaac Morrill, purchased by John Welles in 1836, and passed from him to his daughter Isabella Pratt Welles, wife of H. H. Hunnewell. The house was greatly enlarged in 1891 along plans of Shaw & Hunnewell as a residence for Jane Welles Hunnewell (1851-1936) and her husband Francis Williams Sargent. Jane Hunnewell Sargent was a grandmother of Francis W. Sargent, Governor of Massachusetts from 1969-1975.
- "The Pines" (1891) - residence of Isabella Pratt Hunnewell (1849-1934) and her husband Robert Gould Shaw, designed by Shaw & Hunnewell. Mr. Shaw is not to be confused with his cousin, Robert Gould Shaw, who commanded the African-American 54th Regiment Massachusetts Volunteer Infantry during the US Civil War. This property is no longer in the family, having been sold to Wellesley College in the 1970s.

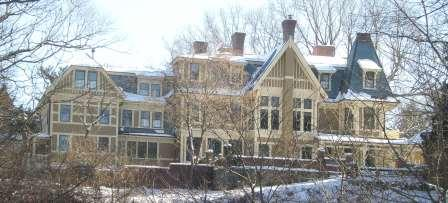
1875 Stick style residence of Walter Hunnewell (1844-1921) in the historic district. Architect: Ware & Van Brunt.

== See also ==
- H. H. Hunnewell estate - within the historic district
- Arnold Arboretum - preceded by the Hunnewell estate
- National Register of Historic Places listings in Norfolk County, Massachusetts
