= H. H. Hunnewell =

American banker (1810–1902)

Horatio Hollis Hunnewell
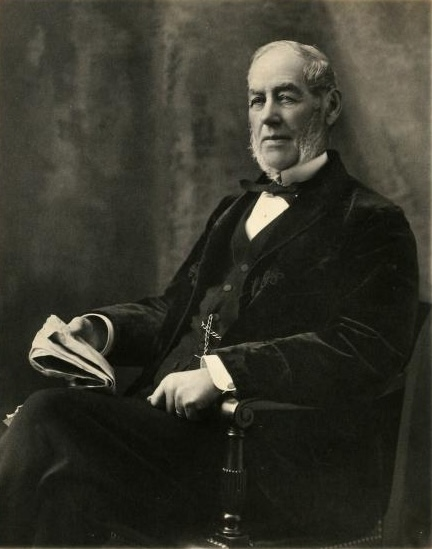

Director of the Illinois Central Railroad
- In office 1862–1871

Personal details
- Born: Horatio Hollis Hunnewell; July 27, 1810 Watertown, Massachusetts
- Died: May 20, 1902 (aged 91) Wellesley, Massachusetts
- Resting place: Mount Auburn Cemetery
- Spouse: Isabella Pratt Welles (m. 1835; died 1888)
- Children: 9

Horatio Hollis Hunnewell (July 27, 1810 – May 20, 1902) was an American railroad financier, philanthropist, amateur botanist, and one of the most prominent horticulturists in America in the nineteenth century. Hunnewell was a partner in the private banking firm of Welles & Co. Paris, France controlled by his in-laws, which specialized in trade finance between the two countries. Practicing horticulture for nearly six decades on his estate in Wellesley, Massachusetts, he was perhaps the first person to cultivate and popularize rhododendrons in the United States.

== Early life ==
Hunnewell was born on July 27, 1810, in Watertown, Massachusetts. He was a son of Susanna (née Cooke) Hunnewell and Dr. Walter Hunnewell, who graduated from Harvard College in 1787, in the same class with John Quincy Adams.

His paternal grandparents were Revolutionary War soldier Richard Hunnewell and Eunice (née Thompson) Hunnewell, and his maternal grandparents were Phineas Cooke and Abigail (née Durant) Cooke.

== Career ==
Hunnewell was a director of the Illinois Central Railroad from 1862 to 1871. He was a railroad entrepreneur in Kansas beginning in the 1860s, and president of the Kansas City, Fort Scott and Gulf Railroad and Kansas City, Lawrence and Southern Railroad around 1880. At the time of his death he was a director of 12 railroads and numerous mining, real estate, and other ventures.

=== Philanthropy ===
H. H. Hunnewell made a donation in 1873 that helped Asa Gray revise and complete his Flora of North America. He also funded the conifer collection at Arnold Arboretum, Boston, Massachusetts, and donated the Arboretum's administration building (now Hunnewell Building) in 1892.

Hunnewell was a friend and neighbor of Henry Fowle Durant (1822–1881), who founded Wellesley College on Lake Waban directly across from Hunnewell's estate. Hunnewell made a donation to the College for Eliot Dormitory in 1887, and endowed the College's Chair of Botany in 1901.

The town of Wellesley's greatest benefactor, Hunnewell built and donated the Wellesley Town Hall and Free Library building (completed 1885), along with 10 acres of adjoining parkland. The Wellesley Free Library has since moved to a new building. He was also a frequent donor, often anonymously, to many town causes. According to a resident at the time, "When leaving here for his winter home (in Boston), Hunnewell would go to our old Town Clerk, Solomon Flagg, and say to him, 'Be sure and not allow anyone to suffer during cold weather. Send them whatever they need and I will pay the bill.' Hunnewell and Flagg were the only ones that knew whose was the helping hand."

== Personal life ==
In 1835, he was married to Isabella Pratt Welles (1812–1888), a daughter of Samuel Welles. She was the half sister of Samuel Welles de Lavalette. Together, they had nine children, including:

- Hollis Hunnewell (1836–1884), who married Louisa Bronson (1843–1890), sister of Frederic Bronson.
- Francis Welles Hunnewell (1838–1917), who married Gertrude Gouverneur Sturgis (1862–1890), daughter of John Hubbard Sturgis.
- Susan Hunnewell (1842–1843), who died in infancy.
- Walter W. Hunnewell (1844–1921), who married Jane Appleton Peele (1848–1893), daughter of Jonathan Willard Peele, in 1873.
- Isabella Pratt Hunnewell (1849–1934), who married Robert Gould Shaw (1850–1931), cousin of Robert Gould Shaw.
- Jane Welles Hunnewell (1851–1936), who married Francis Williams Sargent (1848–1920), grandparents of Governor Francis Sargent.

He died at home in Wellesley, Massachusetts, on May 20, 1902, at age 91. Hunnewell was buried in Mount Auburn Cemetery in Cambridge, Massachusetts, among his family.

=== Estate and arboretum ===
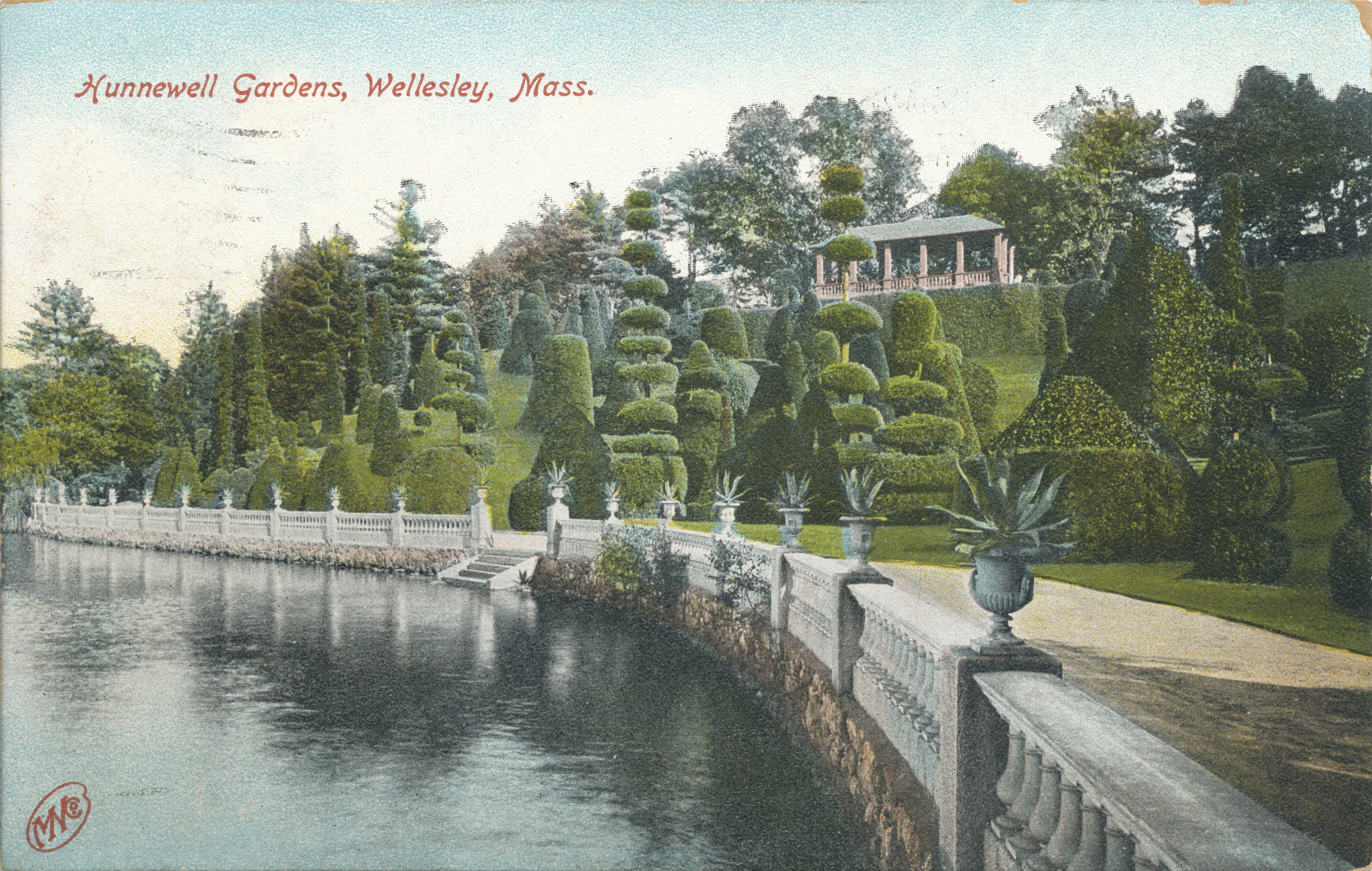
H. H. Hunnewell estate, topiary section on the shore of Lake Waban, Wellesley, Massachusetts (1909).

Starting in 1870, Hunnewell built country homes adjoining his own for seven of his nine children. These estates and adjacent farmland, with one exception still owned by his descendants, form the Hunnewell Estates Historic District, which was added to the National Register of Historic Places in 1988.

Both the town of Wellesley (founded 1881) and Wellesley College (chartered 1870) are named for Hunnewell's estate, "Wellesley", which he named for the family of his wife. The H. H. Hunnewell estate includes a prominent 1851 house designed by Arthur Gilman with attached conservatory and gate lodges of 1865-1866 designed by Gridley J. F. Bryant, a pinetum of 325 specimen conifers, a complex of specialty greenhouses, and the first topiary garden — the "Italian Garden" — in America, all of which are still standing.

The estate is part of the Hunnewell Estates Historic District, which includes the estates of many of his descendants. During the first part of the 20th century, there were 20 contiguous estates for him and his family in Wellesley. Among other miscellaneous properties, Hunnewell owned the home in which Horatio Alger's father lived until his death, now called the Horatio Alger House, in Natick, Massachusetts. Oliver Bacon had built this house about 1824, and sold it in 1869 to Hunnewell. In 1909, Hunnewell deeded the property to the First Unitarian Church of South Natick as a parsonage.

== Legacy ==
The railroad towns of Hunnewell, Kansas, and Hunnewell, Missouri, were named in his honor. The Wellesley College Botanic Gardens has a distinct Hunnewell Arboretum, named in his honor, across the lake. Rhododendron hunnewellianum also honors him.

Along with Nathaniel Thayer Jr., Hunnewell is credited with bringing the game of Real Tennis (a precursor to modern lawn tennis) to America. The game was thought to have first been played in 1876 when Hunnewell and Thayer, who had played the game in England, brought an English professional, Ted Hunt, home with them from Oxford. They built a court on the corner of Buckingham and Dartmouth Streets in the Back Bay section of Boston and put Hunt in charge of it. When the land the court sat on was acquired by the New York & New Haven Railroad towards the end of the century, Hunnewell reorganized the club in a new building at the corner of Hereford and Boylston Streets, forming the Tennis and Racquet Club of Boston
