= Soil fertility =

Ability of a soil to sustain agricultural plant growth

Soil scientists use the capital letters O, A, B, C, and E to identify the master horizons, and lowercase letters for distinctions of these horizons. Most soils have three major horizons—the surface horizon (A), the subsoil (B), and the substratum (C). Some soils have an organic horizon (O) on the surface, but this horizon can also be buried. The master horizon, E, is used for subsurface horizons that have a significant loss of minerals (eluviation). Hard bedrock, which is not soil, uses the letter R.

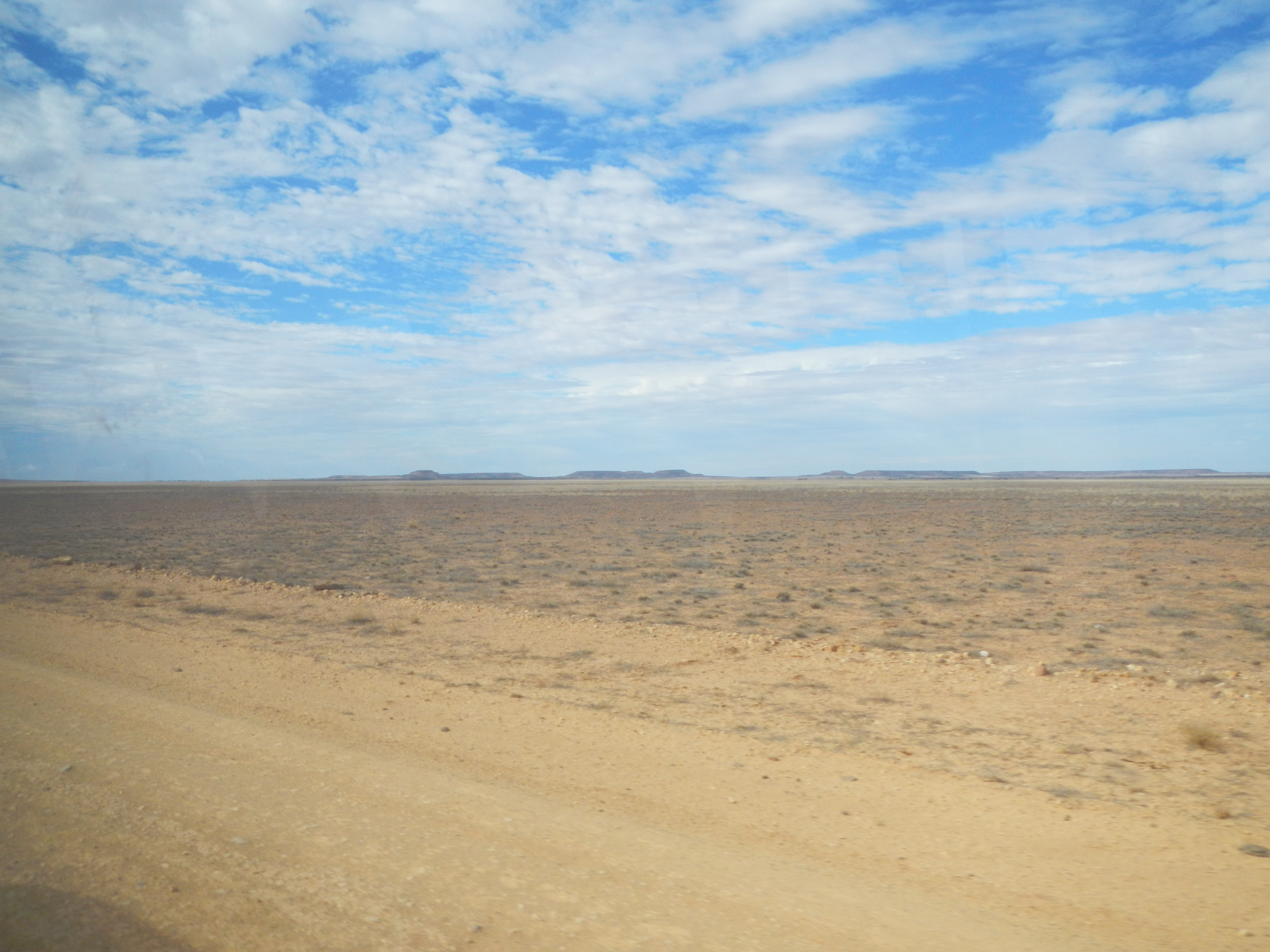
Desert east of Birdsville, Australia. Much of Australia is sparsely populated as its desert soils are mostly infertile; thus unable to support larger scale human habitation.

Soil fertility refers to the ability of soil to sustain agricultural plant growth, i.e. to provide plant habitat and result in sustained and consistent yields of high quality (see also soil health). A fertile soil has the following properties:

- The ability to supply essential plant nutrients and water in adequate amounts and proportions for plant growth and reproduction; and
- The absence of toxic substances which may inhibit plant growth e.g. Fe^{2+} which leads to nutrient toxicity.

The following properties contribute to soil fertility in most situations:

- Sufficient soil depth for adequate root growth and water retention;
- Good internal drainage, allowing sufficient soil aeration for optimal root growth (although some plants, such as rice, tolerate waterlogging);
- Topsoil or horizon O is with sufficient soil organic matter for healthy soil structure and soil moisture retention;
- Soil pH in the range 5.5 to 7.0 (suitable for most plants but some prefer or tolerate more acid or alkaline conditions);
- Adequate concentrations of essential plant nutrients in plant-available forms;
- Presence of a range of microorganisms that support plant growth.

In lands used for agriculture and other human activities, maintenance of soil fertility typically requires the use of soil conservation practices. This is because soil erosion and other forms of soil degradation generally result in a decline in soil quality with respect to one or more of the aspects indicated above.

Soil fertility and quality of land have been impacted by the effects of colonialism and slavery both in the U.S. and globally. The introduction of harmful land practices such as intensive and non-prescribed burnings and deforestation by colonists created long-lasting negative results to the environment. Also, the rise of intensive farming and intensive sylviculture contributed to the collapse of soil quality in developed countries.

Soil fertility and depletion have different origins and consequences in various parts of the world. The intentional creation of dark earth in the Amazon promoted the tight relationship between indigenous communities and their land during Pre-Columbian times and are still searched as areas of high fertility. In African and Middle Eastern regions, humans and the environment are also altered due to soil depletion.

== Soil fertilization ==
Bioavailable phosphorus (available to soil life) is the element in soil that is most often lacking, in particular in humid tropical soils. Nitrogen and potassium are also needed in substantial amounts. For this reason these three elements are always identified on a commercial fertilizer analysis. For example, a 10-10-15 fertilizer has 10 percent nitrogen, 10 percent available phosphorus (P_{2}O_{5}) and 15 percent water-soluble potassium (K_{2}O). Sulfur is the fourth element that may be identified in a commercial analysis—e.g. 21-0-0-24 which would contain 21% nitrogen and 24% sulfate.

Inorganic fertilizers are generally less labour intensive and have higher concentrations of nutrients than organic fertilizers. Also, since nitrogen, phosphorus and potassium generally must be in the inorganic forms to be taken up by plants, inorganic fertilizers are generally immediately bioavailable to plants without modification. However, studies suggest that chemical fertilizers have adverse health impacts on humans including the development of chronic disease from the toxins. As for the environment, over-reliance on inorganic fertilizers disrupts the natural nutrient balance in the soil, resulting in lower soil quality, loss of organic matter, and higher chances for erosion in the soil.

Additionally, the water-soluble nitrate nitrogen in inorganic fertilizers does not provide for the long-term needs of the plant and creates water pollution. Slow-release fertilizers may reduce leaching loss of nutrients and may make the nutrients that they provide available over a longer period of time.

Soil fertility is a complex process that involves the constant cycling of nutrients between organic and inorganic forms. As plant material and animal wastes are decomposed by micro-organisms, they release inorganic nutrients to the soil solution, a process referred to as mineralization. Those nutrients may then undergo further transformations which may be aided or enabled by soil micro-organisms. Like plants, many micro-organisms require or preferentially use inorganic forms of nitrogen, phosphorus or potassium and will compete with plants for these nutrients, tying up the nutrients in microbial biomass, a process often called immobilization. The balance between immobilization and mineralization processes depends on the balance and availability of major nutrients and organic carbon to soil microorganisms. Natural processes such as lightning strikes may fix atmospheric nitrogen by converting it to nitric oxide (NO) and nitrogen dioxide (NO_{2}). In soil, nitrogen fixation is performed by free-living and symbiotic bacteria. Denitrification occurs generally under anaerobic conditions (e.g. flooding, waterlogging, particulate organic matter, soil aggregates) in the presence of denitrifying bacteria, but it may also occur in aerobic environments where oxygen concentration is fluctuating and reduced carbon is available. Nutrient cations, including potassium and many micronutrients, are held in relatively strong electrostatic interaction bonds with the negatively charged portions of the soil (clay, humus) in a process known as cation exchange which has a prominent influence on soil fertility.

Phosphorus is a primary factor of soil fertility as it is essential for cell division and plant development, especially in seedlings and young plants. However, phosphorus is becoming increasingly harder to find and its reserves are starting to be depleted due to its excessive use as a fertilizer. The widespread use of phosphorus in fertilizers has led to pollution and eutrophication. The term peak phosphorus has been coined, due to the limited occurrence of rock phosphate in the world, estimating that U.S. peak phosphorus occurred in 1988 and for the world in 1989.

A wide variety of materials have been described as soil conditioners due to their ability to improve soil quality, including biochar, offering multiple soil health benefits.

Food waste compost was found to have better soil improvement than manure based compost.

== Light and CO_{2} limitations ==
Photosynthesis is the process whereby plants use light energy to drive chemical reactions which convert CO_{2} into sugars. As such, all plants require access to both light and carbon dioxide to produce energy, grow and reproduce.

While typically limited by nitrogen, phosphorus and potassium, low levels of carbon dioxide can also act as a limiting factor on plant growth. Peer-reviewed and published scientific studies have shown that increasing CO_{2} is highly effective at promoting plant growth up to levels over 300 ppm. Further increases in CO_{2} can, to a very small degree, continue to increase net photosynthetic output.

== Soil depletion ==
Soil depletion occurs when the components which contribute to fertility are removed and not replaced, and the conditions which support soil's fertility are not maintained. This leads to poor crop yields, now becoming a global problem. In agriculture, soil depletion can be due to excessively intensive cultivation and inadequate soil management. Depletion may occur through a variety of other effects, including over-tillage (which damages soil structure), overuse of nutrient inputs which leads to mining of the soil nutrient bank, and salinization of soil.

=== Colonial impacts on soil depletion ===
Soil fertility can be severely challenged when land-use changes rapidly. For example, in Colonial New England, colonists made a number of decisions that depleted the soils, including: allowing herd animals to wander freely, not replenishing soils with manure, and a sequence of events that led to erosion. William Cronon wrote that "...the long-term effect was to put those soils in jeopardy. The removal of the forest, the increase in destructive floods, the soil compaction and close-cropping wrought by grazing animals, ploughing—all served to increase erosion." Cronon continues, explaining, "Where mowing was unnecessary and grazing among living trees was possible, settlers saved labor by simply burning the forest undergrowth...and turning loose their cattle...In at least one ill-favored area, the inhabitants of neighboring towns burned so frequently and graze so intensively that...the timber was greatly injured, and the land became hard to subdue...In the long run, cattle tended to encourage the growth of woody, thorn-bearing plants which they could not eat and which, once established, were very difficult to remove". These practices were methods of simplifying labor for colonial settlers in new lands when they were not familiar with traditional Indigenous agricultural methods. Those Indigenous communities were not consulted but rather forced out of their homelands so European settlers could commodify their resources. The practice of intensive land burning and turning loose cattle ruined soil fertility and prohibited sustainable crop growth.

While colonists utilized fire to clear land, certain prescribed burning practices are common and valuable to increase biodiversity and in turn, benefit soil fertility. However, without consideration of the intensity, seasonality, and frequency of the burns, the conservation of biodiversity and the overall health of the soil can be negatively impacted by fire.

In addition to soil erosion through using too much fire, colonial agriculture also resulted in topsoil depletion. Topsoil depletion occurs when the nutrient-rich organic topsoil, which takes hundreds to thousands of years to build up under natural conditions, is eroded or depleted of its original organic material. The Dust Bowl in the Great Plains of North America is a great example of this with about one-half of the original topsoil of the Great Plains having disappeared since the beginning of agricultural production there in the 1880s. Outside of the context of colonialism, many past civilizations' collapses can be attributed to topsoil depletion.

=== Soil depletion and enslavement ===
As historian David Silkenat explains, the goals of Southern plantation and slave owners, instead of measuring productivity based on outputs per acre, were to maximize the amount of labor that could be extracted from the enslaved workforce. The landscape was seen as disposable, and the African slaves were seen as expendable. Once these Southern farmers forced slaves to engage in mass deforestation, they would discard the land and move towards more fertile prospects. The forced slave practices created extensive destruction on the land. The environmental impact included draining swamps, clearing forests for monocropping and fuel steamships, and introducing invasive species, all leading to fragile ecosystems. In the aftermath, these ecosystems left hillsides eroded, rivers clogged with sterile soil, and extinction of native species. Silkenat summarizes this phenomenon of the relationship between enslavement and soil, "Although typically treated separately, slavery and the environment naturally intersect in complex and powerful ways, leaving lasting effects from the period of emancipation through modern-day reckonings with racial justice…the land too fell victim to the slave owner's lash".

=== Global Soil Depletion ===
One of the most widespread occurrences of soil depletion as of 2008 is in tropical zones where nutrient content of soils is low. The depletion of soil has affected the state of plant life and crops in agriculture in many countries. In the Middle East for example, many countries find it difficult to grow produce because of drought, lack of soil (soil erosion), and lack of irrigation. The Middle East has three countries that indicate a decline in crop production, the highest rates of productivity decline being found in hilly and dryland areas.

Many countries in Africa also undergo a depletion of fertile soil, in particular in sub-Saharan Africa (Sahel) under high population pressure. In regions of arid climate like Sudan and the countries that make up the Sahara Desert, droughts and soil degradation are common, aggravated by badly-adapted agricultural practices. Cash crops such as teas, maize, and beans require a high variety and quantity of nutrients in order to grow healthy and sustain population growth. Soil fertility has declined in the farming regions of Africa and the use of artificial and natural fertilizers has been used to regain the nutrients of ground soil.

== Dark Earths ==
=== South America ===
The details of Indigenous societies prior to European colonization in 1492 within the Amazonian regions of South America, particularly the size of the communities and the depth of interactions with the environment, are continually debated. Central to the debate is the influence of Dark Earth. Dark Earth is a type of soil found in the Amazon that has a darker color, higher organic carbon content, and higher fertility than soil in other regions of South America, which makes it highly coveted even today. Dark Earth deposits have been found, through ethnographic and archaeological studies, to have been created through ancient Indigenous practices by intentional soil management.

Ethnoarchaeologist Morgan Schmidt outlines how this carbon-rich soil was intentionally created by communities in the Amazon. While Dark Earth, and other anthropic soils, can be found all throughout the world, Amazonian Dark Earth is particularly significant because "it contrasts too sharply with the especially poor fertility of typical highly weathered tropical upland soils in the Amazon". There is much evidence to suggest that the development of ancient agricultural societies in the Amazon was strongly influenced by the formation of Dark Earth. As a result, Amazonian societies benefitted from the dark earth in terms of agricultural success and enhanced food production. Soil analyses have been completed on the modern and ancient Kuikuro Indigenous Territory in the Upper Xingu River basin in southeastern Amazonia through archaeological and ethnographic research to determine the human relation to the soil. The "results demonstrate the intentional creation of dark earth, highlighting how Indigenous knowledge can provide strategies for sustainable rainforest management". Present-day addition of orgnic waste products (fish and manioc refuses), ashes and charcoal as mounds up to ~50 to 60 cm above the original ground surface by Kuikuro Amerindians was hypothesized to be common practice in Pre-Columbian agriculture. By transforming charcoal in black carbon, a source of highly stable humus, the grinding and mixing activity of the peregrine pantropical earthworm Pontoscolex corethrurus adds a natural biological phenomenon to our knowledge of the formation of the fertile Amazonian Dark Earths.

=== Africa ===
In Egypt, earthworms of the Nile River Valley contributed to the significant fertility of the soils. As a result, Cleopatra declared the earthworm a sacred animal to be revered and protected by all her subjects. Egyptians were not allowed to remove so much as a single worm from the land of Egypt, and even farmers were not allowed to touch an earthworm for fear of offending the god of fertility. In Ghana and Liberia, it is a long-standing practice to combine different types of waste to create fertile soil that is referred to as African Dark Earths. This soil contains high concentrations of calcium, phosphorus, and carbon.

=== North America and Eurasia ===
Also called Mollisols, Chernozems or Black Soils, with a number of variants, Dark Earths are widespread in North America and in a mid-latitude stretch extending over a large part of Eurasia. The formation of these fertile carbon- and nutrient-rich zonal soils was longtime attributed to dry continental climate conditions and steppe or prairie vegetation (according to biomes) until it became admitted that past human activities (deposition of domestic and occupational wastes, charred residues, biomass ashes, burning, fertilisation) were a driving factor of Dark Earth formation, and that not only in the tropics. The presence in the A horizon of sand- and silt-size char particles of both wood and herb origin attests for previously forested environments which humans destroyed by fire for the sake of agriculture or hunting of large herbivores after the Last Glacial Period. Whether charcoal was deliberately managed by humans as a soil conditioner and whether earthworm grinding and mixing of charcoal contributed to the formation of temperate Dark Earths is still a matter of conjecture, although it has been claimed that Prehistoric agriculture favored earthworm abundance for Chernozem formation.

== Humans and soil ==
Albert Howard is credited as the first Westerner to publish Native techniques of sustainable agriculture. As noted by Howard in 1945, "In all future studies of disease we must, therefore, always begin with the soil. This must be gotten into good condition first of all and then the reaction of the soil, the plant, animal, and man observed. Many diseases will then automatically disappear... Soil fertility is the basis of the public health system of the future...". Howard connects the health crises of crops to the impacts of livestock and human health, ultimately spreading the message that humans must respect and restore the soil for the benefit of the human and non-human world. He continues that industrial agriculture disrupts the delicate balance of nature and irrevocably robs the soil of its fertility.

== Irrigation effects ==
Irrigation is a process by which crops are watered by man-made means, such as bringing in water from pipes, canals, or sprinklers. Irrigation is used when the natural rainfall patterns of a region are not sustainable enough to maintain crops. Ancient civilizations heavily relied on irrigation and today about 18% of the world's cropland is irrigated. The quality of irrigation water is very important to maintain soil fertility and tilth, and for using more soil depth by the plants. When soil is irrigated with high alkaline water, unwanted sodium salts build up in the soil which would make soil draining capacity very poor. So plant roots cannot penetrate deep into the soil for optimum growth in Alkali soils. When soil is irrigated with low pH (acidic) water, the useful salts (Ca, Mg, K, P, S, etc.) are removed by draining water from the acidic soil and in addition plant-unwanted aluminium and manganese salts are dissolved from the soil, impeding plant growth. When soil is irrigated with high salinity water or sufficient water is not draining out from the irrigated soil, the soil would convert into saline soil and lose its fertility. Saline water enhances the turgor pressure or osmotic pressure requirement which impedes the uptake of water and nutrients by the plant roots.

Topsoil loss takes place in alkali soils due to erosion by rainwater surface runoff or drainage as they form colloids (fine mud) in contact with water. Plants absorb water-soluble inorganic salts mostly from the soil for their growth, although some non-neglectable uptake occurs also from rain and aerial spray deposited on the foliage. Soil as such does not lose fertility just by growing crops if weathering of soil minerals compensate for nutrients exported in harvest. However, it can lose its fertility through the accumulation of unwanted and depletion of wanted inorganic salts by improper irrigation and acid rain water. The fertility of many soils which are not suitable for plant growth can be enhanced many times gradually by providing adequate irrigation water of suitable quality and good drainage from the soil.

== Global distribution ==
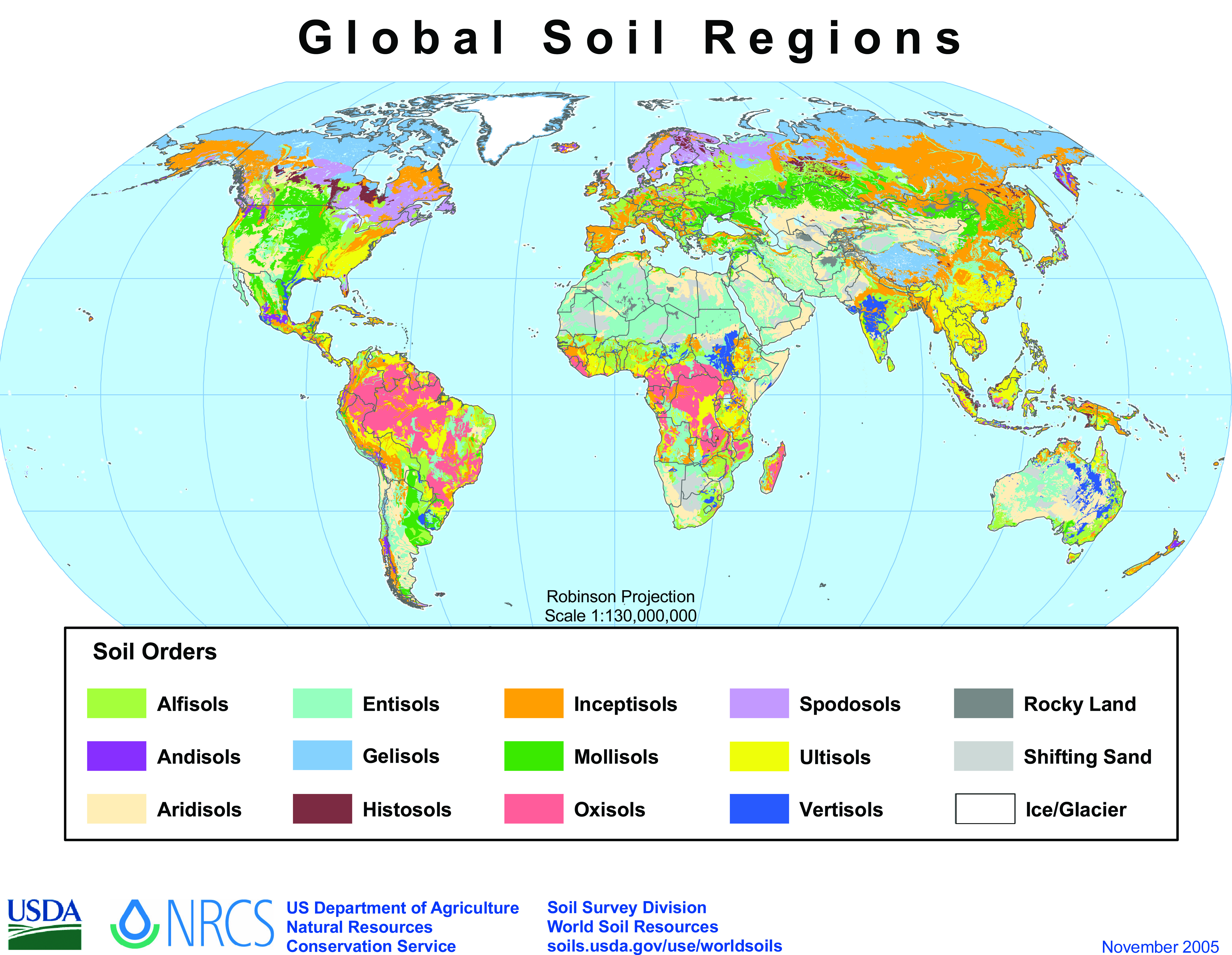
Global distribution of soil types of the USDA soil taxonomy system. Mollisols, shown here in dark green, are a good (though not the only) indicator of high soil fertility. They coincide to a large extent with the world's major grain producing areas like the North American Prairie States, the Pampa and Gran Chaco of South America and the Ukraine-to-Central Asia Black Earth belt.

== See also ==
- Arable land
- Plaggen soil
- Shifting cultivation
- Soil contamination
- Soil life
- Terra preta
- Cation-exchange capacity
