= Virtuoso =

Individual with outstanding ability

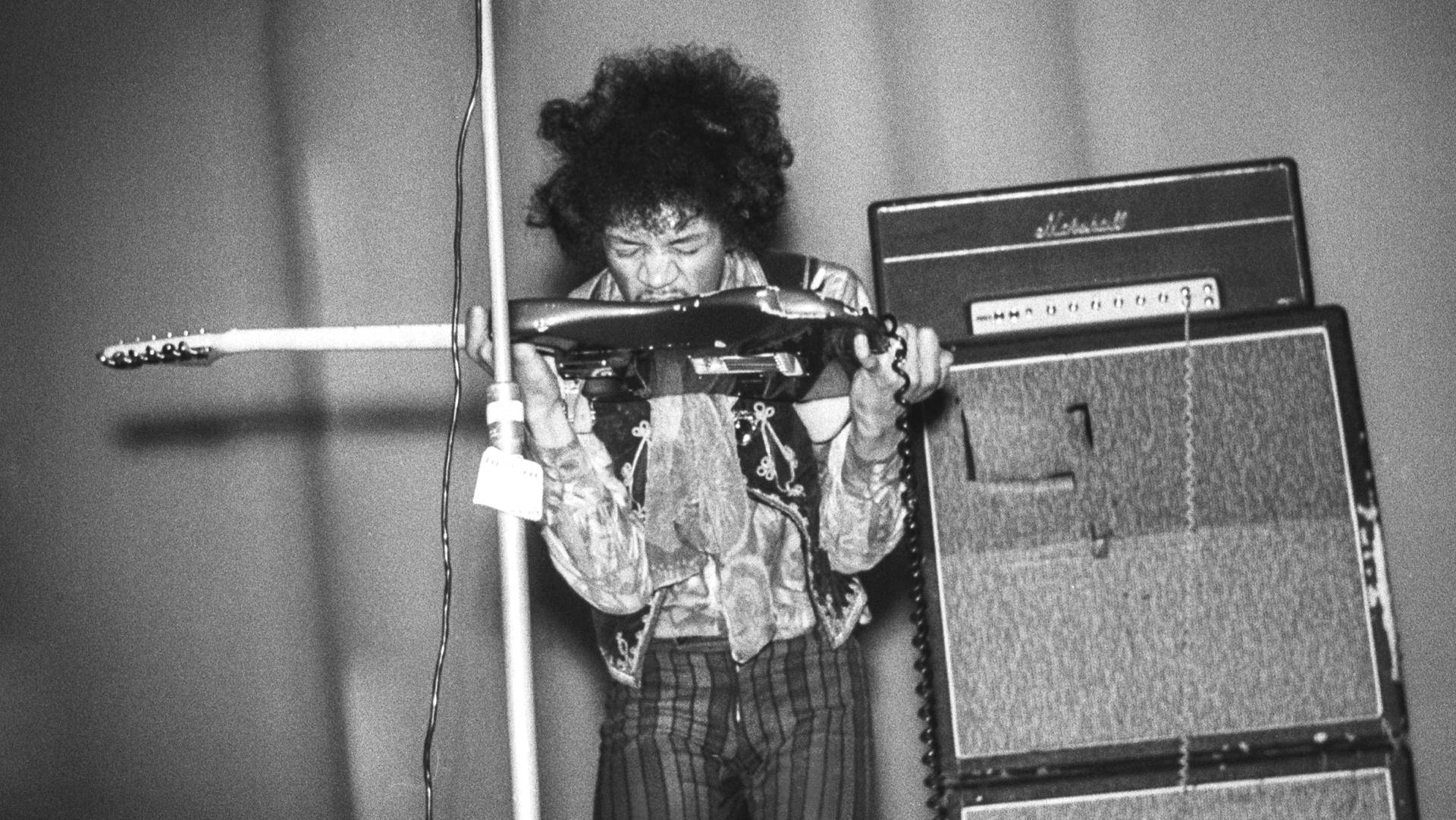
Jimi Hendrix is often regarded as a modern virtuoso - both a skilled musician and performer.

A virtuoso (from Italian virtuoso, Italian: [virˈtwoːzo] or Italian: [virtuˈoːso]; Late Latin virtuosus; Latin virtus; 'virtue', 'excellence' or 'skill') is an individual who possesses outstanding talent and technical ability in a particular art or field such as fine arts, music, singing, playing a musical instrument, or composition.

== Meaning ==
This word also refers to a person who has cultivated appreciation of artistic excellence, either as a connoisseur or collector. The plural of virtuoso is either virtuosi or the Anglicisation virtuosos, and the feminine forms are virtuosa and virtuose.

According to Music in the Western World by Piero Weiss and Richard Taruskin:

...A virtuoso was, originally, a highly accomplished musician, but by the nineteenth century the term had become restricted to performers, both vocal and instrumental, whose technical accomplishments were so pronounced as to dazzle the public.

The defining element of virtuosity is the performance ability of the musician in question, who is capable of displaying feats of skill well above the average performer.

Especially in music, both critics and musicians have mixed opinions on virtuosity. While the skill implied is clearly positive, musicians focused on virtuosity have been criticized for overlooking substance and emotion in favor of raw technical prowess.

More commonly applied in the context of the fine arts, the term can also refer to a "master" or "ace" who excels technically within any particular field or area of human knowledge—anyone especially or dazzlingly skilled at what they do.

== History ==
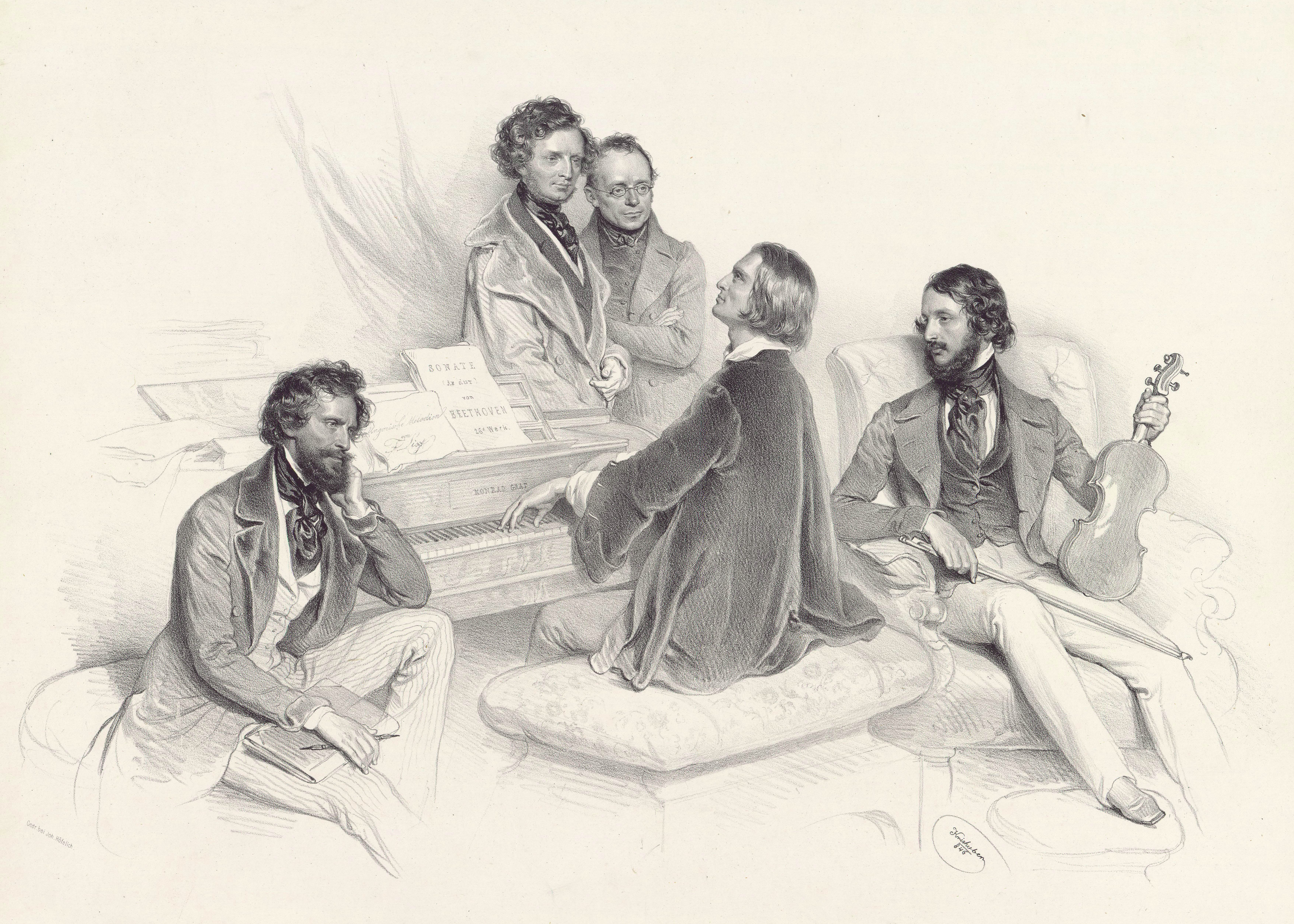
Franz Liszt was one of the first musicians to be called a virtuoso.

The meaning of virtuoso has its roots in the Italian usage of the sixteenth and seventeenth centuries, signifying an honorific term reserved for a person distinguished in any intellectual or artistic field. The term evolved with time, simultaneously broadening and narrowing in scope as interpretations went in and out of fashion and debates unraveled. Originally a musician was considered a virtuoso by being an accomplished composer, theorist, or maestro, rather than a skilled performer.

In the 17th and 18th centuries, the word shifted in meaning, and many musicians applied it without considering merit, sometimes to themselves. Sébastien de Brossard, in his Dictionnaire de Musique (Paris, 1703), approached the word virtuoso by its Latin root virtu emphasizing exceptional training, especially in theory. This position was also defended in Johann Gottfried Walther's Musicalisches Lexicon (1732) favoring the theorist over the performer. Johann Mattheson's Der brauchbare Virtuoso (1720) maintained the respect for the traditional "theoretische Virtuosen" (theoretical virtuoso) but also paid tribute to the "virtuosi prattici" (performer virtuoso).

Johann Kuhnau in his The Musical Charlatan (Der musikalische Quack-Salber, 1700) defined the "true virtuoso", once again emphasizing theory ("der wahre Virtuose"), while describing the "highly gifted musician" ("der glückselige Musicus") or "performer virtuoso" as having nothing more than practical facility.

The concept of virtuosity today is typically associated with flashy, technical performance rather than accomplishments as a composer, theorist, etc. Modern virtuosi are known for fast, exciting works and often for using their talents in spaces like international competitions. While historical virtuosi like Niccolò Paganini and Franz Liszt were performers as well as composers, a 21st-century virtuosi is primarily a performing musician.

As virtuosic playing has gained popularity over the centuries, more exciting music has ingrained itself into the culture in unique ways. Many music pedagogues emphasize technique in private teaching as a way to approach modern, virtuosic repertoire. Additionally, much of classical music that becomes popular among non-musicians tends to lean into difficult, flashy styles.

=== Early views on virtuosity in music ===
In the late 18th century, people began to use the term to describe an instrumentalist or vocalist who pursued a career as a soloist. The tension about the merit of practical virtuosity started to grow at the same time and intensified in the 19th century, only to remain an open debate since then. Franz Liszt, considered one of the greatest of all virtuosos, declared that "virtuosity is not an outgrowth, but an indispensable element of music" (Gesammelte Schriften, iv, 1855–9). Richard Wagner opposed the "triviality and exhibitionist talents of the performer", voicing his opinion strongly:

The real dignity of the virtuoso rests solely on the dignity he is able to preserve for creative art; if he or she trifles and toys with this, he casts his honour away. He or she is the intermediary of the artistic idea.

In the nineteenth century, the public beliefs and attitudes surrounding virtuosity in music greatly varied. Many believed that it was essential for success, while others believed it was a detriment. The celebrity status obtained by such performers was often fueled by tabloid-like rumors, mythical comparisons, and manipulative marketing tactics. On one such occasion, a London theatre critic referred to a Paganini concert as his "fifth and final concert". Purposefully presenting misinformation to gain publicity for the performers became a regular occurrence.

== See also ==
- Genius
