= Andiorrhinus kuru =

Scientific classification
- Kingdom: Animalia
- Phylum: Annelida
- Clade: Pleistoannelida
- Clade: Sedentaria
- Class: Clitellata
- Order: Opisthopora
- Suborder: Lumbricina
- Family: Glossoscolecidae
- Genus: Andiorrhinus
- Species: A. kuru

Binomial name
- Andiorrhinus kuru A.G. Moreno & Paoletti, 2004

Species of annelid worm

Andiorrhinus kuru of the family Glossoscolecidae in the class Oligochaeta is a species of earthworm found in the Alto Orinoco of Amazonas state in Venezuela. Worms of the genus Andiorrhinus are believed to create the Surales landscapes of Venezuela and Colombia, composed of green mounds which form intricate patterns in the floodplains of the Orinoco River of South America.

This earthworm features in the diet of the Makiritare Indians together with another species Andiorrhinus motto (Righi and Araujo, 1999). Andiorrhinus kuru is large, terrestrial and occurs in the upland forest of the Padamo River, being found under 10–20 cm of soil near the root mat of the trees.
