= St. Bernard's School =

Independent, secular, all-boys school in New York City

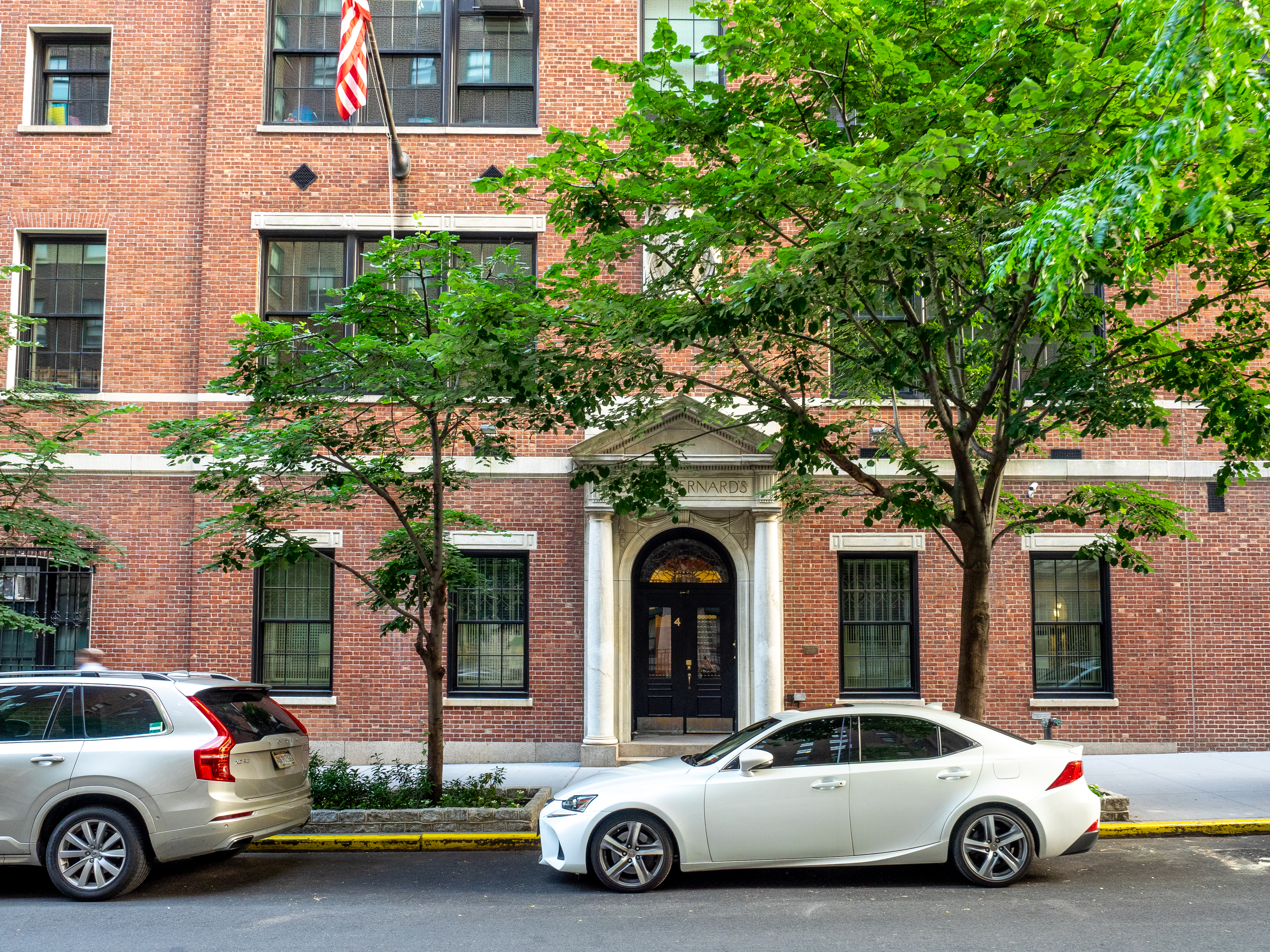
- As seen from 98th street (2019)

Location
- 4 E. 98th Street; New York City; United States; 40°47′19.6″N 73°57′15.17″W

Information
- Type: Independent, secular, all-male all-boys
- Motto: Perge sed caute (Proceed, but with caution)
- Established: 1904
- Founder: John Card Jenkins
- Headmaster: Joy S. Hurd IV
- Grades: K-9
- Gender: Male
- Enrollment: 372 Boys
- Campus: Urban
- Colors: Red and white
- Athletics: Soccer, Baseball, Basketball, Track, Cross Country, Flag Football, Lacrosse
- Mascot: St. Bernard (dog)
- Nickname: St. B's
- Yearbook: The Keg
- Website: stbernards.org

St. Bernard's School is a private, all-male elementary school in the Carnegie Hill neighborhood of Manhattan's Upper East Side. It was founded in 1904 by John Card Jenkins, along with Francis Tabor. The school shield depicts an eagle (representing the United States of America), a lion (representing Great Britain), a book (symbol of education), and a cross (representing a tradition of Christianity).

The school's name is not pronounced the same way as that of the breed of dog with the same spelling, which is also its mascot. It was named for the rue St-Bernard in Brussels, Belgium, where a relative of one of St. Bernard's founders had also founded a school.

== History ==
The school was founded in 1904 by John Card Jenkins and Francis Tabor. Both graduates of Cambridge University, they had met after knocking heads on a soccer pitch. Originally on the upper floors of a small Midtown building, the school relocated to its current location on 98th street in 1915. The original 1915 building by Delano and Aldrich still stands, although it has undergone significant expansion and renovation, most recently in 1997.

In April 2021, it was announced that Joy S. Hurd IV had been appointed to serve as the school's next headmaster, starting his role on July 1, 2022. Mr. Hurd taught at St. Bernard's for several years and was most recently the head of Lake Forest Country Day School. He is a graduate of Harvard College and has master's degrees from Columbia University's Teachers College and the Bread Loaf School of Middlebury College.

== Students ==
The school has three divisions: the Junior (or Lower) School consists of grades K through 3, the Middle School grades 4 through 6, and the Upper School grades 7 through 9. Mondays through Thursdays, boys in the Junior School must wear St. Bernard's polo shirts (polo shirts with the school shield emblazoned upon the chest) in either red, white, or blue, khakis, and a blazer. Boys in the Middle and Upper Schools must wear a polo or oxford shirt, accompanied by khakis and blazers as well. On Fridays, all boys wear jackets and ties (with the exception of the kindergartners).

St. Bernard's alumni, known as Old Boys, earn admission to a wide range of secondary schools in the United States and the United Kingdom, both day and boarding. The schools attended with greatest frequency include Andover, Collegiate, Deerfield, Exeter, Groton, Horace Mann, Lawrenceville, St. Paul's, Stuyvesant, and Trinity.

== Notable people ==
=== Headmasters ===
- John C. Jenkins (1874-1958) – 1904 – 1949 - School founder
- R.I.W. Westgate (1905-1988) – 1949 – 1971 -
- Stuart H. Johnson, III - 1985 – 2020
- Evan Moraitis - 2020 – 2022
- Joy S. Hurd IV – 2022 - Present

=== Alumni ===
Alumni of the school are called “Old Boys”. Notable alumni include:

- Prince Aristides-Stavros of Greece and Denmark, son of Crown Prince Pavlos of Greece and Marie-Chantal Miller
- Louis Auchincloss, novelist, winner of the National Medal of Arts
- Andrew Bernard, economist
- Bartle Bull, novelist
- Billy Bush, journalist
- Matt Cohler, venture capitalist
- Greg Daniels, television writer, four-time Emmy winner
- Avery Dulles, Jesuit priest, theologian and author, member of the College of Cardinals
- Theodore Dunham Jr., astronomer and physicist
- Larry Fessenden, actor
- Anthony Gardner, U.S. Ambassador to the European Union from 2014 to 2017
- Elbridge T. Gerry Sr., businessman and polo champion
- John Hammond, record producer and member of the Rock and Roll Hall of Fame
- Arthur M. Jolly, playwright
- Roger Wolfe Kahn, jazz musician
- Bill Keenan, author and former professional ice hockey player
- Paul Klebnikov, investigative journalist and historian
- Jonathan Levine, film director and screenwriter
- Peter Magowan, former managing general partner of the San Francisco Giants
- Skizzy Mars, rapper
- Peter Matthiessen, co-founder of The Paris Review, only writer to have won the National Book Award in both nonfiction and fiction.
- James Merrill, poet
- Gifford Miller, politician
- Seth Morgan, novelist
- Peter Pennoyer, architect
- Michael Grace Phipps, businessman and polo champion
- George Plimpton, co-founder of The Paris Review, notable "New Journalist"
- Fuller Potter, abstract painter
- John P. Roberts, organizer of the Woodstock Festival
- Benno C. Schmidt Jr., 20th President of Yale University, founder of Avenues: The World School
- David Silkenat, historian
- James W. Symington, four-term member of the U.S. House of Representatives, Chief of Protocol of the United States
- Antonio Weiss, senior fellow at Harvard's Kennedy School, Counselor to the Secretary of the US Treasury from 2015 to 2017
- Tom Werner, current chairman of Liverpool Football Club and the Boston Red Sox
- Tim Zagat, publisher of the Zagat Survey

=== Notable faculty ===
- Julius Mutekanga, track and cross country coach
- David King-Wood, longtime former faculty member, directed the school's Shakespeare play and is the namesake of an auditorium in the school
- Gordon Bradley, former coach of the school's soccer team
- Edgar G. Crossman, past president of the board of trustees
- Don M. Wilson III, former trustee

== In popular culture ==
- The film Prince of the City referenced the school as the alma mater of one of the prosecutors charged with investigating police corruption. The film's cop protagonist remarks, "St. Bernard's. That's in the 2-3, that's, uh, little blond boys in blazers, right?"
- In Season 2, Episode 13 ("The Whole Truth") of Lie To Me, Victor Musso, best friend and business partner of the deceased victim, takes to the stand to say, "We've been best friends since we were ten at St. Bernard's."
- In 1936, James Merrill played the First Herald ("a small part...but an important one") in St. Bernard's production of Richard II. Merrill recalled the experience in his 1985 poem "The School Play".

== Affiliated organizations ==
Sources:

- New York State Association of Independent Schools (NYSAIS)
- International Boys' School Coalition (IBSC)
- National Association of Independent Schools (NAIS)
- Independent School Admission Association of Greater New York (ISAAGNY)
