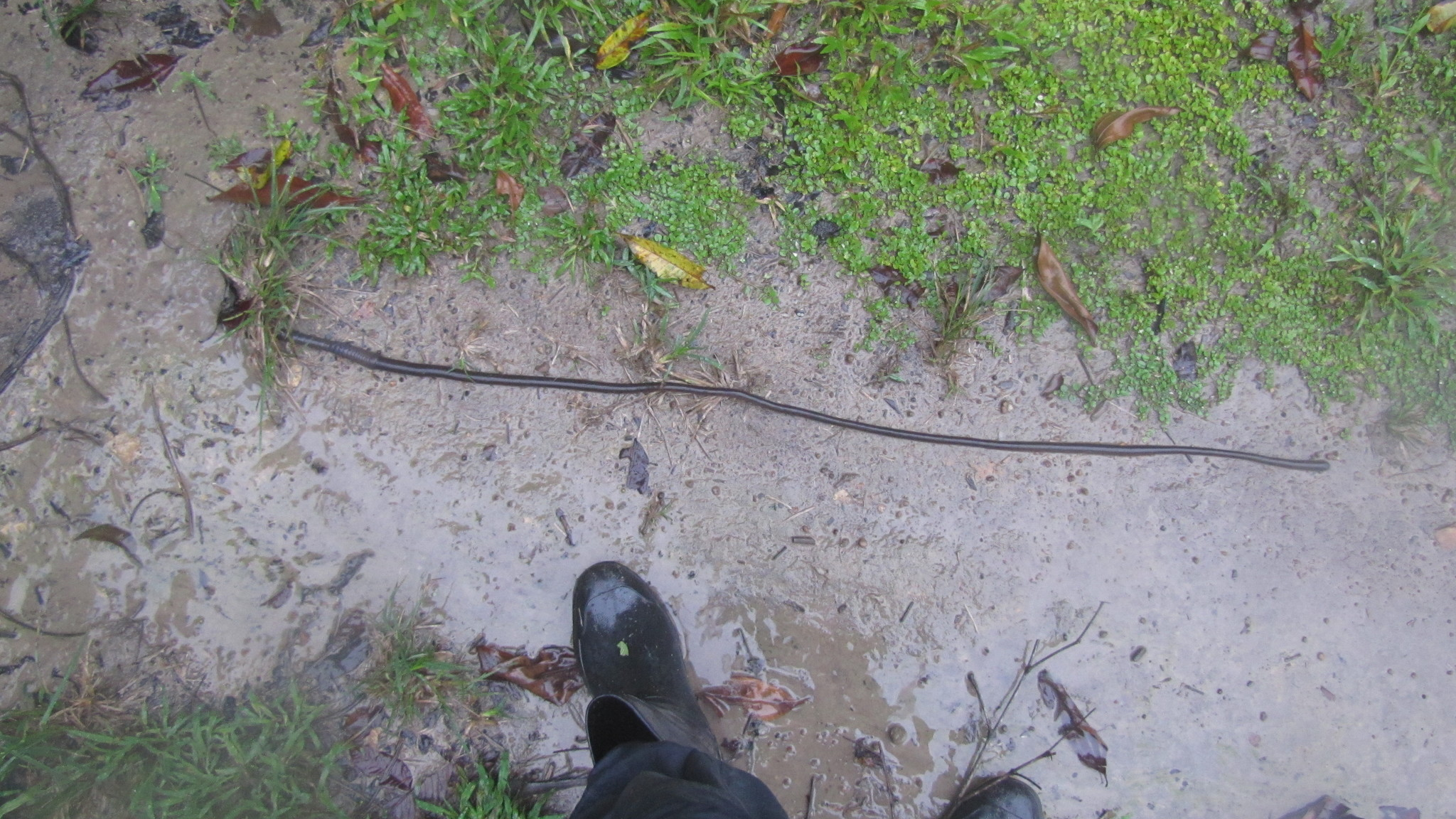

Scientific classification
- Kingdom: Animalia
- Phylum: Annelida
- Clade: Pleistoannelida
- Clade: Sedentaria
- Class: Clitellata
- Order: Opisthopora
- Suborder: Lumbricina
- Family: Glossoscolecidae
- Genus: Glossoscolex; Leuckart in von Froriep, 1835

= Glossoscolex =

Genus of earthworms

Glossoscolex is a genus of South American earthworms.
