= Antonio Weiss =

American investment banker and publisher

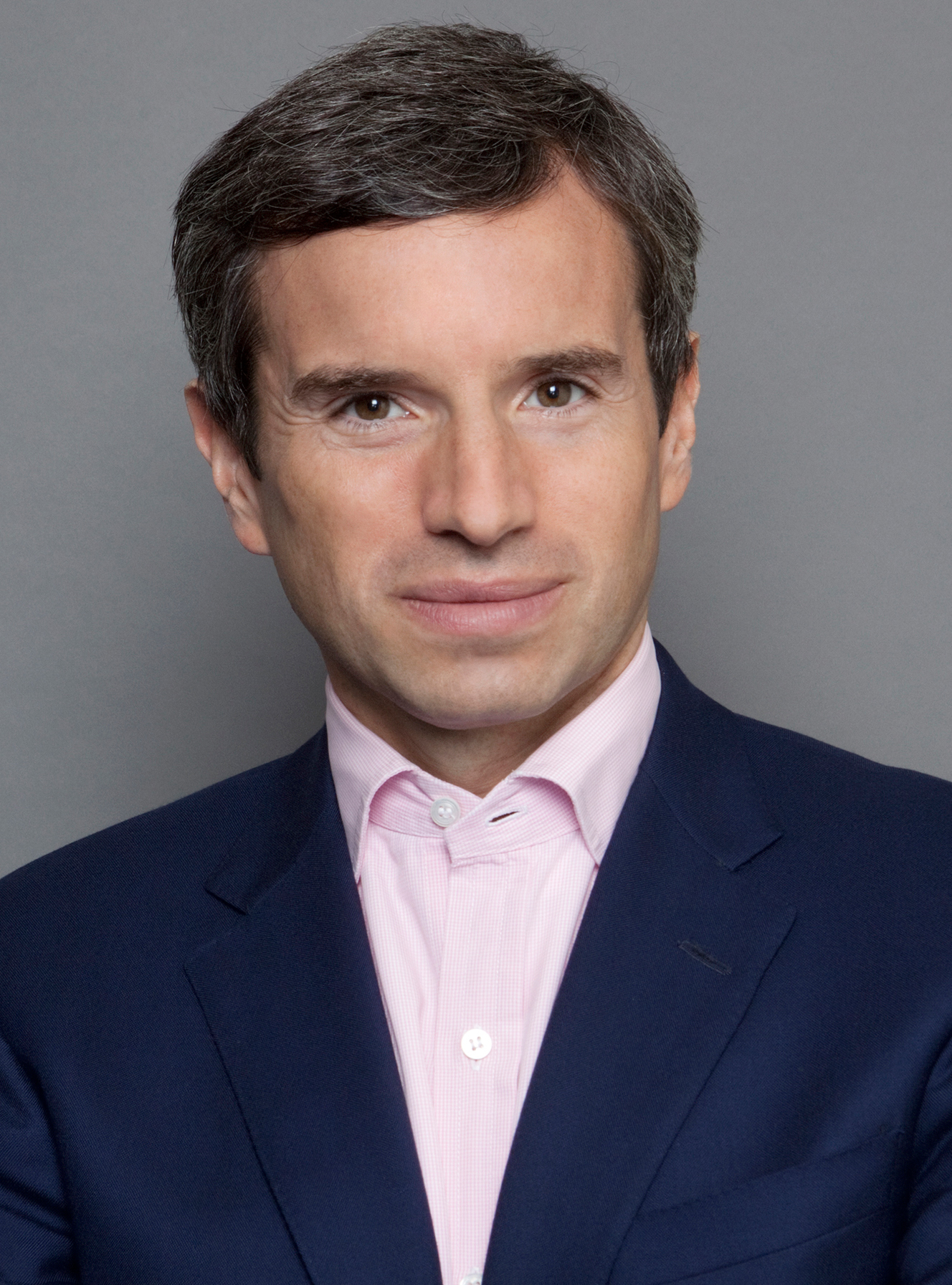

Personal details
- Born: September 28, 1966 (age 59) United States
- Political party: Democratic
- Spouse: Susannah Hunnewell (m. 1993; died 2019)
- Children: 3
- Education: Yale University (BA); Harvard University (MBA)

Antonio Francesco Weiss (born September 28, 1966) is an American investor, policymaker, and former publisher. He is a senior fellow at the Mossavar-Rahmani Center for Business and Government at Harvard's Kennedy School and an investor at SSW Partners LP.

Weiss served as the Counselor to the Secretary of the US Treasury from January 2015 to January 2017 where he advised on domestic and international issues, including financial markets, regulatory reform, job creation, and fostering broad-based economic growth. In 2016, Weiss led the Obama Administration's response to the financial crisis in Puerto Rico and helped broker the Puerto Rico Oversight, Management, and Economic Stability Act.

He was previously head of investment banking for Lazard, a global financial advisory and asset management firm and lived for many years in France. He is a former publisher and senior editor of the Paris Review, where he apprenticed to founder and editor George Plimpton.

== Education ==
Weiss attended Yale College and received his MBA at Harvard Business School, where he was a Baker Scholar and a Loeb Fellow in Finance.

== Banking career ==
Weiss joined Lazard in New York in 1994 and became a partner in 1998. From 2001 to 2009, Weiss was based in Paris, France where he served as a vice chairman of European investment banking, and subsequently global head of mergers and acquisitions. In 2009, Weiss moved back to the U.S. and was named the global head of investment banking for Lazard. In 2021, SSW Partners LP led the acquisition of Swedish auto parts company Veoneer in partnership with Qualcomm.

Weiss has served on the board of Banco Santander since 2024.

== U.S. Treasury ==
After his nomination to be undersecretary of domestic finance at the Treasury Department was opposed by Senator Elizabeth Warren, Weiss served the Treasury as an unofficial advisor, beginning in early 2015. In 2016, as a public debt crisis brought Puerto Rico to the brink of default, Weiss helped to broker a U.S. law to allow the commonwealth to restructure its $70 billion in debt under the supervision of an oversight board. Weiss testified before both chambers of Congress to explain PROMESA and the Obama Administration's plan to address the Puerto Rican debt crisis. The law was criticized on the right by fiscal conservatives unhappy with the possible cost to U.S. taxpayers and on the left by advocates for workers and for Puerto Rican autonomy, but was heralded as "the only piece of major economic policy to pass Congress" to date in 2016.

After the October 15, 2014 "flash crash", Weiss led Treasury's role in the joint regulatory review of the irregularity.

In recognition of his achievements at the Treasury, he was presented the Alexander Hamilton Award, the department's highest order.

== Affiliations ==
Weiss is a member of the Council on Foreign Relations, a director of the Volcker Alliance, and a director of the French-American Foundation. Prior to joining the US Treasury, Weiss was a trustee of The Frick Collection. In 2024, Weiss chaired an independent panel of experts to advise New York City on fiscal matters. The board of Santander elected Weiss as an independent director in 2024.

== Publications ==
Weiss co-authored the December, 2012 Center for American Progress report, “Reforming Our Tax System, Reducing Our Deficit,” which recommended a more progressive tax regime and a balanced approach to long-term debt reduction and the May 2017 Peterson Institute report, “The Financial Stability Oversight Council: An Essential Role for the Evolving U.S. Financial System”, which discussed the importance of the Council in the face of pressure to limit its authorities. He also authored "A proposal to tax financial transactions" in January 2020, which recommends the implementation of a new financial transaction tax on assets including stocks, bonds, and derivatives, to raise revenue for the federal government.

He is a frequent contributor on public policy to various publications, including Foreign Affairs, Bloomberg, The Wall Street Journal, and The New York Times.

== Personal life ==
Weiss married Susannah Hunnewell in 1993. He lives with their three sons in New York City. Weiss is the son of Piero Weiss and Carole Severson Weiss.
