= Andiorrhinus =

Scientific classification
- Domain: Eukaryota
- Kingdom: Animalia
- Phylum: Annelida
- Clade: Pleistoannelida
- Clade: Sedentaria
- Class: Clitellata
- Order: Opisthopora
- Suborder: Lumbricina
- Family: Glossoscolecidae
- Genus: Andiorrhinus; Cognetti, 1908

Genus of earthworms

Andiorrhinus is a genus of earthworm in the family Glossoscolecidae. The genus contains 37 species subdivided into four subgenera.

== Subdivisions ==
Andiorrhinus (Amazonidrilus) Righi, 1993

- Andiorrhinus aberratus Zicsi & Csuzdi, 1999
- Andiorrhinus bolivianus Zicsi, 1995
- Andiorrhinus gavi Righi & Araujo, 2000
- Andiorrhinus motto Righi & Araujo, 1999
- Andiorrhinus rondoniensis Righi, 1986
- Andiorrhinus tukuko Righi, 1996

Andiorrhinus (Andiorrhinus) Cognetti, 1908

- Andiorrhinus amazonius Michaelsen, 1915
- Andiorrhinus baniwa Righi & Nemeth, 1983
- Andiorrhinus bare Righi & Nemeth, 1983
- Andiorrhinus boconius Righi, 1990
- Andiorrhinus brunneus (Michaelsen, 1892)
- Andiorrhinus bucki Righi, 1986
- Andiorrhinus caudatus Righi & Ayres & Bittencourt, 1976
- Andiorrhinus duidanus Michaelsen, 1936
- Andiorrhinus evelineae Righi, 1986
- Andiorrhinus holmgreni Michaelsen, 1917
- Andiorrhinus kuika Righi, 1993
- Andiorrhinus kuru Moreno & Paoletti, 2004
- Andiorrhinus mandauaka Righi & Nemeth, 1983
- Andiorrhinus marcuzzii Omodeo, 1954
- Andiorrhinus meansi James, 2009
- Andiorrhinus montanus Zicsi, 1995
- Andiorrhinus muku Righi, 1989
- Andiorrhinus mukuci Righi, 1993
- Andiorrhinus paraguayensis (Rosa, 1895)
- Andiorrhinus pauate Righi, 1986
- Andiorrhinus pictus Michaelsen, 1925
- Andiorrhinus planaria Michaelsen, 1934
- Andiorrhinus proboscideus Cernosvitov, 1939
- Andiorrhinus rubescens Michaelsen, 1925
- Andiorrhinus salvadorii Cognetti, 1908
- Andiorrhinus venezuelanus (Cognetti, 1907)

Andiorrhinus (Meridrilus) Righi, 1993

- Andiorrhinus guamo (Righi, 1990)
- Andiorrhinus rimeda Righi & Araujo, 2000

Andiorrhinus (Turedrilus) Righi, 1993

- Andiorrhinus acaciascensis Feijoo, 2008
- Andiorrhinus royeroi Drachenberg, 1991
- Andiorrhinus samuelensis Righi, 1986
