= Glossodrilus =

Scientific classification
- Kingdom: Animalia
- Phylum: Annelida
- Clade: Pleistoannelida
- Clade: Sedentaria
- Class: Clitellata
- Order: Opisthopora
- Suborder: Lumbricina
- Family: Glossoscolecidae
- Genus: Glossodrilus; Cognetti de Martiis, 1905

Genus of earthworms

Glossodrilus is a genus of South American earthworms.

== Species ==
Species in this genus include:

- Glossodrilus antisanae
- Glossodrilus antunesi
- Glossodrilus baiuca
- Glossodrilus baloghi
- Glossodrilus benavidesi
- Glossodrilus betoye
- Glossodrilus bresslaui
- Glossodrilus chaguala
- Glossodrilus chami
- Glossodrilus chimborazoi
- Glossodrilus cibca
- Glossodrilus cornutus
- Glossodrilus crassicauda
- Glossodrilus crucifer
- Glossodrilus dorasque
- Glossodrilus dudichi
- Glossodrilus excelsus
- Glossodrilus fragilis
- Glossodrilus geayi
- Glossodrilus griseus
- Glossodrilus kalmari
- Glossodrilus kaszabi
- Glossodrilus kuna
- Glossodrilus lacteus
- Glossodrilus landeszi
- Glossodrilus lojanus
- Glossodrilus loksai
- Glossodrilus lopezae
- Glossodrilus mahnerti
- Glossodrilus marabora
- Glossodrilus meridionalis
- Glossodrilus motu
- Glossodrilus nemoralis
- Glossodrilus orosi
- Glossodrilus paez
- Glossodrilus palenke
- Glossodrilus pan
- Glossodrilus panikita
- Glossodrilus papillatus
- Glossodrilus paralojanus
- Glossodrilus paraloksai
- Glossodrilus parecis
- Glossodrilus parvus
- Glossodrilus peregrinoides
- Glossodrilus perrieri
- Glossodrilus pixao
- Glossodrilus saija
- Glossodrilus schuetti
- Glossodrilus seidlae
- Glossodrilus smithi
- Glossodrilus taranae
- Glossodrilus totaritoensis
- Glossodrilus tuberculatus
- Glossodrilus tulcanus
- Glossodrilus unguis
- Glossodrilus yuko
