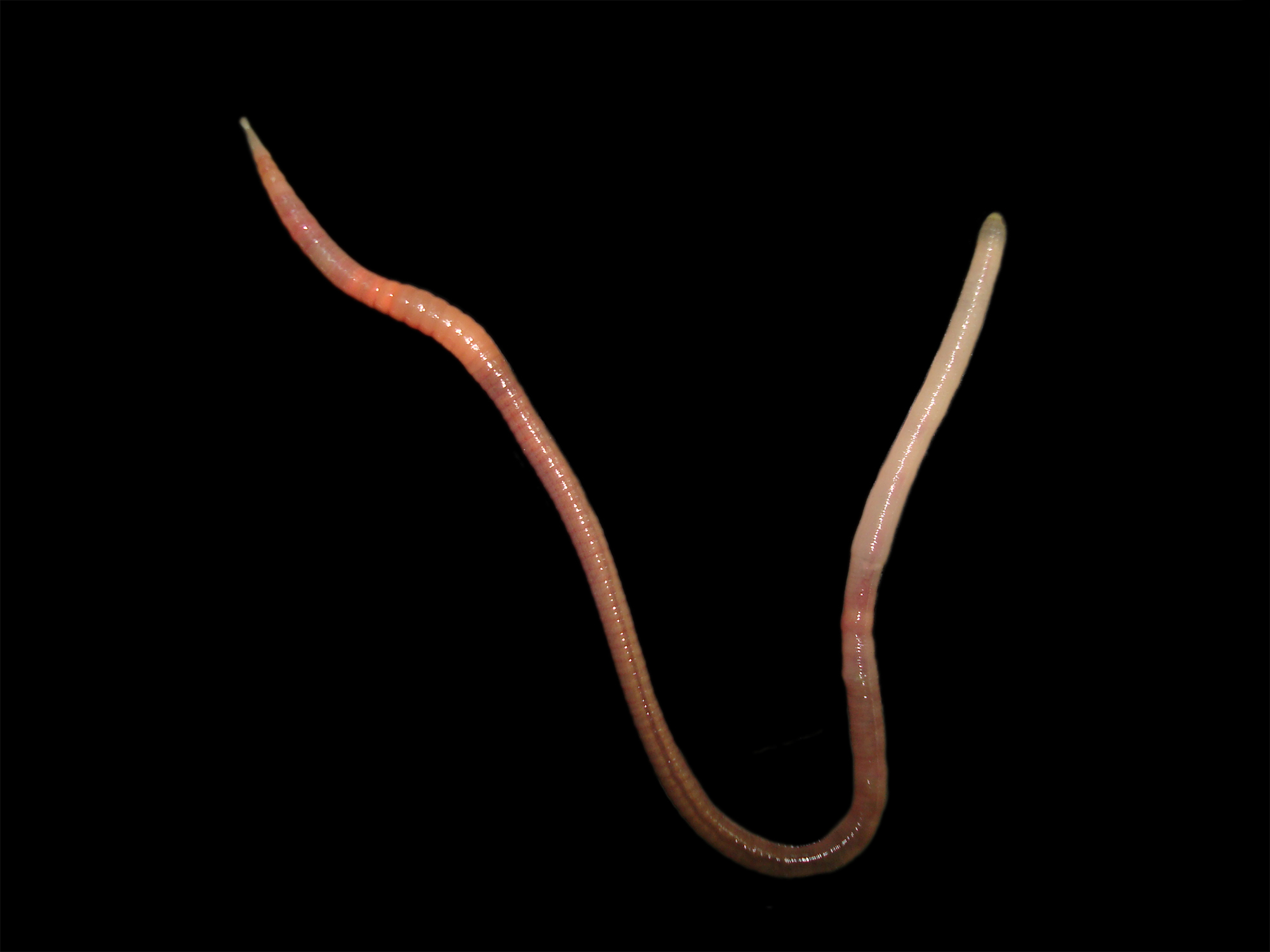
- Pontoscolex corethrurus

Scientific classification
- Kingdom: Animalia
- Phylum: Annelida
- Clade: Pleistoannelida
- Clade: Sedentaria
- Class: Clitellata
- Order: Opisthopora
- Suborder: Lumbricina
- Family: Glossoscolecidae
- Genus: Pontoscolex; Schmarda, 1861

Species
- See text

= Pontoscolex =

Genus of earthworms

Pontoscolex is a genus of earthworms in the family Glossoscolecidae, or alternatively, in the family Rhinodrilidae.

== General characteristics ==
The type species Pontoscolex corethrurus has a circumtropical distribution, although it originates in the Neotropics, probably in the Guiana Plateau. It reproduces parthenogenetically, and under experimental conditions can complete its life cycle in about one year. Adults measure 5–10 cm (2.0–3.9 in) in length.

== Diagnostic characteristics ==
There are eight setae per segment, arranged in regular rows, at least in the anterior part of the animal, whereas in the posterior part the arrangement varies (regular, more or less irregular, or in quincunx). No pigment is usually present. Male pores and tubercula pubertatis are in the clitellar region. The gizzard is in the segment VI. Three pairs of calciferous glands of tubular-dichotomous (panicled) structure are in the segments VII–IX. Dorsal, ventral, supra- and subesophageal and subneural vessels are present. Lateral hearts are located in the segments VII–IX and intestinal hearts in the segments X and XI. The holonephridia have terminal sphincter. They are metandric and metagynous. The seminal vesicles are usually long and band-like, piercing a number of septa. Spermathecae are simple.

== Species ==
- Pontoscolex corethrurus (Müller, 1856)
- Pontoscolex cuasi (Righi, 1984)
- Pontoscolex cynthiae (Borges & Moreno, 1990)
- Pontoscolex franzi (Zicsi & Csuzdi, 1999)
- Pontoscolex hingstoni (Stephenson, 1931)
- Pontoscolex hystrix (Perrier, 1872)
- Pontoscolex kuneguara (Righi, 1989)
- Pontoscolex lilljeborgi (Eisen, 1896)
- Pontoscolex maracaensis (Righi, 1984)
- Pontoscolex melissae (Borges & Moreno, 1990)
- Pontoscolex nogueirai (Righi, 1984)
- Pontoscolex pydanieli (Righi, 1988)
- Pontoscolex spiralis (Borges & Moreno, 1990)
- Pontoscolex vairemensis (Righi, 1985)
- Pontoscolex vandersleeni (Michaelsen, 1933)
