= Enantiodrilus borellii =

Scientific classification
- Kingdom: Animalia
- Phylum: Annelida
- Clade: Pleistoannelida
- Clade: Sedentaria
- Class: Clitellata
- Order: Opisthopora
- Suborder: Lumbricina
- Family: Glossoscolecidae
- Genus: Enantiodrilus
- Species: E. borellii

Binomial name
- Enantiodrilus borellii Cognetti, 1902

Synonyms
- Diaguita michaelseni Cordero, 1942; Diaguita vivianeae Righi, 1984

Genus of earthworms

Enantiodrilus borellii is a species of South American earthworm.
