= Holoscolex =

Scientific classification
- Domain: Eukaryota
- Kingdom: Animalia
- Phylum: Annelida
- Clade: Pleistoannelida
- Clade: Sedentaria
- Class: Clitellata
- Order: Opisthopora
- Suborder: Lumbricina
- Family: Glossoscolecidae
- Genus: Holoscolex; Cognetti de Martiis, 1904

Species
- See text

Genus of earthworms

Holoscolex is a genus of South American earthworms.
