= Edgar G. Crossman =

American diplomat

Edgar Gibson Crossman
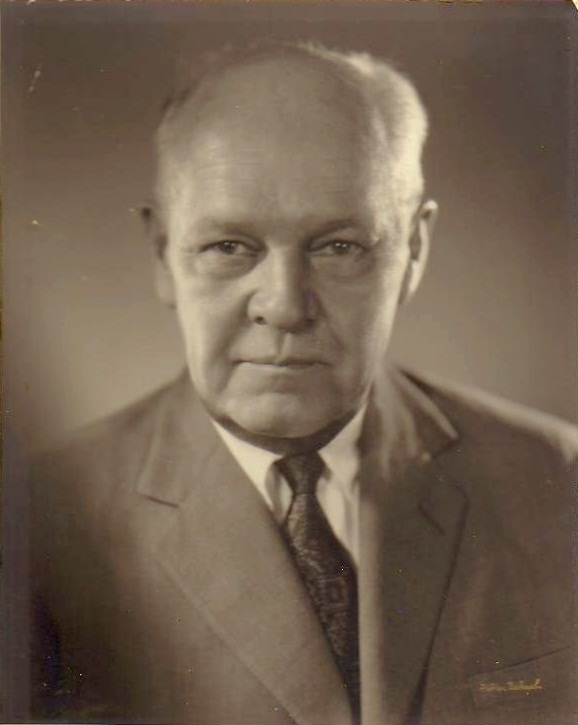
- Born: April 26, 1895; Lisbon, New Hampshire
- Died: January 28, 1967 (aged 71) New York City
- Allegiance: United States of America
- Branch: United States Army
- Service years: 1916–1919; 1944–1945
- Rank: Colonel
- Awards: Legion of Merit; Distinguished Service Star (Philippines)

Edgar Gibson "Eddie" Crossman (April 26, 1895 – January 28, 1967). was an attorney and senior partner in Davis, Polk, Wardwell, Sunderland & Kiendl (now Davis Polk & Wardwell), an officer in the United States Army in World War I and World War I.

== Family background ==
Crossman was born in Lisbon, New Hampshire, to Dr. Edgar Orrin Crossman, a famous physician and surgeon and Florence Alice Lavinia (née Gibson) Crossman, a homemaker. Mrs. Crossman was a native of Guelph, Ontario, Canada. He was an only child. Dr. Crossman studied at New Hampshire College of Agriculture and the Mechanic Arts (now the University of New Hampshire) in Hanover and received his M.D. from the University of Vermont in 1887. Dr. Crossman served as President of the White Mountains Medical Society; and in 1903 was elected to the New Hampshire General Court, the state legislature. Subsequently, Dr. Crossman was head of the Lakeview Sanitarium in Burlington, Vermont. During World War I, Dr. Crossman was a Captain in the Army Medical Corps. From 1923–1929, he was the first Regional Medical Director, U.S. Veteran's Bureau in Boston and then in Washington, D.C. The Crossman's were members of the Congregational Church.

== Education ==
Crossman graduated from Portsmouth High School, Portsmouth, New Hampshire in 1912 and Phillips Academy, Andover, Massachusetts in 1913. He matriculated in Yale College, majored in English, and was awarded an A.B. in 1917. At Yale, Crossman was on the Freshman Football Squad, the "Yale Daily News" Board, and the Senior Class Book Committee; additionally, he was a member of Psi Upsilon and Wolf's Head Society. Crossman enrolled at Harvard Law School and received his L.L.B. degree in 1922.

== World War I ==
In 1916, Crossman enrolled in the Reserve Officers' Training Corps (ROTC) at Yale and reported to the Plattsburgh Barracks, Plattsburgh, New York for training. He was commissioned a Second Lieutenant in the Field Artillery on August 15, 1917. Crossman was assigned to the 76th Field Artillery at Fort Ethan Allen, Vermont and promoted to First Lieutenant on October 26. He was transferred to the 4th Field Artillery at Camp Shelby, Mississippi on December 8, 1917 and assumed command of Battery C, 4th Field Artillery at Camp Shelby on June 6, 1918. Subsequently, he commanded this battery at Camp Logan, Houston, Texas and at Camp Scurry, Corpus Christi, Texas until January 4, 1919. Crossman was recommended for promotion to Captain on October 27, 1918, but the appointment was not made due to the Armistice. From January 9 – March 1919 Crossman attended the Battery Officer's course in the Field Artillery School of Fire at Fort Sill, Oklahoma. He returned to the 4th Field Artillery at Camp Stanley, Texas as a Battery Commander, and transferred to the Reserve Corps (inactive) on June 11, 1919. Crossman was Captain Field Artillery Reserve from 1919–1924 and a Major from 1924.

1st Lieutenant Edgar Gibson Crossman, Field Artillery, United States Army, Circa 1917.

== Interwar period ==
From 1922–1925, Crossman was an associate at Winthrop & Stimson, a major New York law firm. In 1925, he joined David, Polk, Wardwell, Gardiner & Reed. In 1928, at the invitation of Henry L. Stimson, Governor-General of the Philippines, Crossman took a leave of absence from the firm and became his legal aide. On his way to the Philippines, abroad the Empress of Asia, Crossman met Helen "Hi" Greatsinger Farrell Caldwell, a widow who was travelling to see, Walter Greatsinger Farrell, her elder brother; a Marine aviator assigned to the 4th Marines in Shanghai. Subsequently, they were married in Manila.The Honorable Henry L. Stimson, Governor General of the Philippines and Mrs. Stimson, the Honorable and Mrs. Manuel Quezon, President, Philippine Senate and later President of the Philippines and Admiral Mark Lambert Bristol USN, Commander, Asiatic Fleet and Mrs. Bristol were among the distinguished guests. This event marked one of the first times that Filipinos and their wives were invited to official parties.

At the conclusion of his assignment, the Crossman's traveled in China, traversed the Soviet Union via the Trans-Siberian Railway, and spent some time in Moscow, Warsaw, Prague and other cities in Europe. Crossman resumed his career at Davis, Polk in New York. He was made a partner in April 1934. In 1941, Crossman became a member of the Executive Committee and Chairman of the Committee on Admissions of the New York Bar Association. He also belonged to the American Bar Association and was a member of the New York County Republican Committee.

== World War II ==
The wartime memoirs of Colonel Edgar G. Crossman

During the War, combat over-age officer personnel with governmental, medical, legal, financial experience were commissioned as Civil Affairs officers. As a result of his experience in the Philippines, Crossman applied to rejoin the Army and was recalled to active duty on June 6, 1944 and commissioned as a Lieutenant Colonel and Civil Affairs Officer on June 28, 1944. He was and attached to General Headquarters Southwest Pacific Area (GHQ SWPA) and United States Army Forces in the Far East (USAFFE).

Crossman served in Australia, New Guinea and the Philippines. He participated in the landing in Leyte and helped reestablish civilian government in the Philippines. As Executive Officer and deputy to Brigadier General Courtney Whitney, Chief of the Civil Affairs Section. Crossman frequently dealt personally with General Douglas MacArthur. Crossman's role was complicated as MacArthur's professional staff was jealous of him as he had known the General socially in the Philippines when he worked for Stimson. On July 27, 1945, Crossman was promoted to Colonel and was requested by Stimson, then the United States Secretary of War, to be MacArthur's representative on his personal staff in Washington, D.C. In this capacity, he performed a liaison function and was ordered to help rewrite the Japanese Occupation Directive which incorporated his experience during the Philippine campaign. On October 1, 1945, Crossman was released from active duty and ordered to his home of record at 1088 Park Avenue in New York, New York. He recorded his experiences in a previously unpublished manuscript, My Experiences in WWII.

In 1947, Crossman was appointed American Chairman of the Joint American-Philippine Finance Commission, acting as personal representative of President Harry S. Truman, with the rank of Minister. Crossman co-chaired the Commission with Finance Secretary Miguel Cuaderno, Sr. The Commission studied Philippine financial, monetary, and fiscal problems and recommended a shift from the dollar exchange standard to a managed currency system. The new Central Bank of the Philippines Bangko Sentral ng Pilipinas implemented the Commission's recommendations.

An oil painting of Colonel Edgar G. Crossman, Field Artillery, Army of the United States, 1946.

== Resumption of civilian career ==
In 1947, Crossman returned to practicing law at Davis, Polk in New York; and as outside counsel continued to advise major institutional clients such as Morgan Stanley, the Northern Pacific Railroad and Freeport Sulfur. He practiced law until shortly before his death.

Toward the end of World War II, The Institute of Pacific Relations (IPR), an NGO established in 1925 to provide a forum for discussion of problems and relations between nations of the Pacific Rim fell under criticism for alleged communist sympathies. In 1952, as a result of his long interest in Asia, Crossman represented IPR, pro bono, before the Senate Internal Security Subcommittee, chaired by Senator Pat McCarran. When he represented the IPR, Crossman and his colleagues were unaware of the Verona intercepts, which were not released to the public until 1995, that implicated several key staffers of the IPR as Communists or collaborators.

== Personal ==
Wedding photograph of Edgar G. Crossman and Helen F. Caldwell (center, first row), Malacañan Palace, Manila, January 21, 1929.

On January 21, 1929, Crossman married Helen "Hi" Greatsinger (née Farrell) Caldwell (November 23, 1898, Duluth, Minnesota – February 11, 1970, New York, New York) in Manila. Previously, Mrs. Crossman married John Christie Caldwell in 1917. In the 1925, Caldwell died in a hotel fire. Helen Crossman was the daughter of Dr. Patricinne Joseph Hosie Farrell and Edna Claire (née Greatsinger) Farrell of Winnetka, Illinois.

The Crossmans had three sons. Namely: Edgar Orrin Crossman II (March 14, 1930, New York, New York - November 26, 2008, New York, New York), Patrick Farrell Crossman (September 23, 1931, New York, New York -) of New York and Norfolk, Connecticut, and John Gibson Crossman (May 5, 1936, New York, New York -) of Bonita, California.

The Crossmans were active participants in New York society and maintained an apartment in New York and a farm in Goshen, Connecticut. Crossman's clubs included: the Anglers', the Century Association, Knickerbocker Club, Yale Club of New York City in New York, the Sanctum Club in Litchfield, Connecticut, the Hollenbeck Club in Canaan, Connecticut, the Amabalish Fish and Game Club, Lac Saint-Jean, Quebec, and Mrs. Crossman was a member of the Colony Club in New York. Together they were members of the Litchfield Country Club, Litchfield, Connecticut.

Crossman was a past president of the board of trustees of St. Bernard's School in New York, New York.

After Christmas in 1966, Crossman suffered a stroke and died of a heart attack in St. Luke's Hospital, New York, New York, on January 28, 1967. His funeral was held in the Madison Avenue Presbyterian Church, at 73rd Street. Edgar and Helen Crossman are buried in Arlington National Cemetery in Section 3, Site 8976-B.

== Dates of rank ==
Insignia	Rank	Dates
	Second Lieutenant	August 15, 1917
	First Lieutenant	October 26, 1917
	Lieutenant Colonel	June 28, 1944
	Colonel	July 27, 1945

=== Decorations, medals and awards ===
Crossman was awarded the following:

1st Row		Legion of Merit	
2nd Row	Mexican Border Service Medal	World War I Victory Medal	Asiatic-Pacific Campaign Medal w/ 3 bronze stars
3rd Row	World War II Victory Medal	Distinguished Service Star	Philippines Liberation Medal w/ 2 bronze stars
