= Fuller Potter =

American Abstract expressionist artist

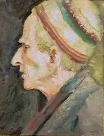
Fuller Potter painted by Elaine G. Mills

Joseph Wiltsie Fuller Potter Jr. (April 24, 1910 – 1990) was an American Abstract expressionist artist. He was born in New York City in 1910, attended St. Bernard's School in New York and Groton School in Groton, Massachusetts, and lived most of his life in his Ledyard, Connecticut estate, near Old Mystic. Potter started painting in the traditional modes of representation, specializing in still life and landscape. His work was shown in New York in the 1930s at the Marie Harriman Gallery.

Potter spent several of his formative years painting landscapes and portraits in the Southern Appalachia region, later studying painting in Paris with André Lhote from 1929 to 1931, and in New York with Walt Kuhn and with Thomas Hart Benton. In 1950, Potter met Jackson Pollock and changed his mode of painting permanently to abstraction, and had a number of shows of that body of work at the Mystic Gallery in Mystic, Connecticut. When starting his transition towards abstract painting, he combined his graphic skills with his mastery of color, and followed a path that would lead to his artistic peak, during his full abstract expressionist period.

During the 1940s, Potter's work was still mostly figurative, but showed deliberate avoidance of ordinary representation. From the early 1950s on, Potter's style kept with the early works of Ad Reinhardt and with Jackson Pollock's 1940s pre-drip works. He painted in the "New York School" style, along with several of his contemporaries, including Franz Kline (1910–1962), Joan Mitchell (1925–1992), Jean-Paul Riopelle, William Baziotes (1910–1963), and Jackson Pollock (1912–1956). He had a few shows in that style at several New England art venues. The Museum of the City of New York exhibited Potter's work along with Joan Miró and Georgia O'Keeffe in the main lobby in 1959.

Jeffrey Potter's To a Violent Grave, a biography of Jackson Pollock's last years, reports that Potter shared drinking sessions with Pollock in the mid-1950s. After these encounters, which occupied only a short period of his life, Fuller Potter's work evolved towards a mature and personal form of abstraction. Potter never pursued the drip/throw action mode of abstract expressionism to any notable degree. His paint is delivered with loaded brush in hand, opulently, generously and aggressively.

Fuller Potter died of emphysema in May 1990 at Westerly Hospital in Westerly, Rhode Island. He was 80 years old.
