= Theodore Dunham Jr. =

American astronomer and physicist

- Born: December 17, 1897; New York City, New York
- Died: April 3, 1984 (aged 86); Chocorua, New Hampshire
- Education: Dartmouth College
- Scientific career
- Fields: astronomy, physics
- Workplaces: Mount Wilson Observatory

Theodore Dunham Jr. (December 17, 1897 – April 3, 1984) was an American astronomer and physicist.

He was born in New York City, the first-born son of Theodore Dunham, a surgeon, and Josephine Balestier. He was educated at the private schools St. Bernard's School and Browning School, both in New York. At Harvard University he studied chemistry and graduated summa cum laude in 1921 with an A.B. His graduate work was at Cornell University, where he was awarded his M.D. in 1925. He then studied physics at Princeton University, earning an A.M. in 1926 and a Ph.D. in 1927. He was married to Miriam Phillips Thompson in 1926, and the couple had two children.

In 1928 he joined the staff of Mount Wilson Observatory, where he remained until 1947. In 1932, together with Walter S. Adams, they discovered that the atmosphere of Venus contained carbon dioxide under high pressure. Two years later in 1934, the two found that the amount of oxygen in the atmosphere of Mars was less than one percent of the amount over a comparable area on Earth. In 1936 he became the scientific director of the Fund for Astrophysical Research, and he held that position for the remainder of his life. During World War II he served in the Office of Scientific Research and Development, where he was chief of the optical instrument section.

Beginning in 1946, he performed medical research into the application of physical methods. He was at the Harvard Medical School until 1948 as a Warren Fellow in Surgery, before moving to University of Rochester. Between 1948 and 1957 he developed tools that could be used for spectrophotometric analysis of locations within a biological cell. He joined the Australian National University faculty in 1957. He became a senior research fellow at the University of Tasmania in 1965, before returning to the United States in 1970. There he rejoined the Harvard College Observatory.

He died at his home in Chocorua, New Hampshire. In his honor, the Fund for Astrophysical Research makes annual Theodore Dunham, Jr. Grants for Research in Astronomy.
