= Urochaeta =

Scientific classification
- Kingdom: Animalia
- Phylum: Annelida
- Clade: Pleistoannelida
- Clade: Sedentaria
- Class: Clitellata
- Order: Opisthopora
- Suborder: Lumbricina
- Family: Glossoscolecidae
- Genus: Urochaeta

Species
- Urochaeta australiensis

Genus of earthworms

Urochaeta is a genus of South American earthworm.
