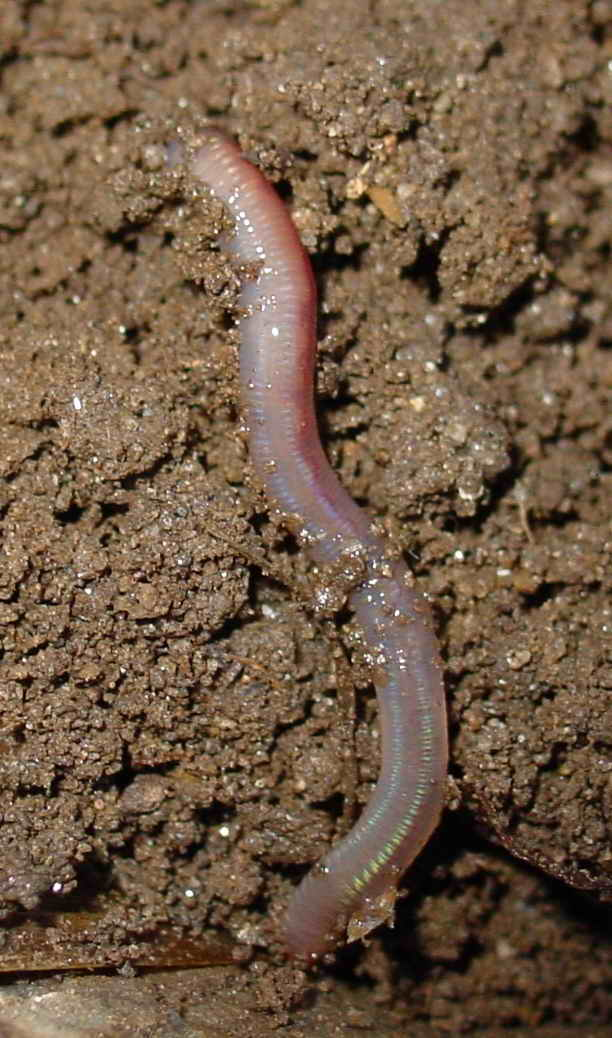
- Glossoscolecidae

Scientific classification
- Kingdom: Animalia
- Phylum: Annelida
- Clade: Pleistoannelida
- Clade: Sedentaria
- Class: Clitellata
- Order: Opisthopora
- Suborder: Lumbricina
- Family: Glossoscolecidae

Genera
- See text.

= Glossoscolecidae =

Family of annelids

The Glossoscolecidae are a large family of earthworms (annelids) which has native representatives in South and Central America. The species Pontoscolex corethrurus has a circumtropical distribution.

They are found mostly in forest, but one species of earthworms lives primarily in coastal beach sand. The earthworms in this family can reach up to 2 m in length.

== Selected genera ==
- Andiorrhinus
- Diaguita
- Enantiodrilus
- Eurydame
- Fimoscolex
- Glossodrilus
- Glossoscolex
- Holoscolex
- Rhigiodrilus
- Urochaeta
- Pontoscolex
