= Enantiodrilus =

Scientific classification
- Kingdom: Animalia
- Phylum: Annelida
- Clade: Pleistoannelida
- Clade: Sedentaria
- Class: Clitellata
- Order: Opisthopora
- Suborder: Lumbricina
- Family: Glossoscolecidae
- Genus: Enantiodrilus; Cognetti, 1902

Species
- Enantiodrilus borellii Cognetti, 1902; Enantiodrilus cognettii Michaelsen, 1933

Genus of earthworms

Enantiodrilus is a genus of South American earthworm in the family Glossoscolecidae.
