= Fimoscolex =

Scientific classification
- Kingdom: Animalia
- Phylum: Annelida
- Clade: Pleistoannelida
- Clade: Sedentaria
- Class: Clitellata
- Order: Opisthopora
- Suborder: Lumbricina
- Family: Glossoscolecidae
- Genus: Fimoscolex; Michaelsen, 1900

Species
- See text

Genus of earthworms

Fimoscolex is a genus of South American earthworms.

== Species ==
Species of this genus include:

- Fimoscolex nivae
