= Eurydame =

Scientific classification
- Kingdom: Animalia
- Phylum: Annelida
- Clade: Pleistoannelida
- Clade: Sedentaria
- Class: Clitellata
- Order: Haplotaxida
- Family: Rhinodrilidae
- Genus: Eurydame; Kinberg, 1867

Genus of earthworms

Eurydame is a genus of South American earthworm in the family Rhinodrilidae.
