= Susannah Hunnewell =

American editor and publisher (1966–2019)

Susannah Gordon Hunnewell (July 16, 1966 – June 15, 2019) was an American editor and publisher. She was the publisher of The Paris Review. Hunnewell was born in Boston and spent much of her life in Paris. In 2018 she was named as a Chevalier of the French order of arts and letters.
