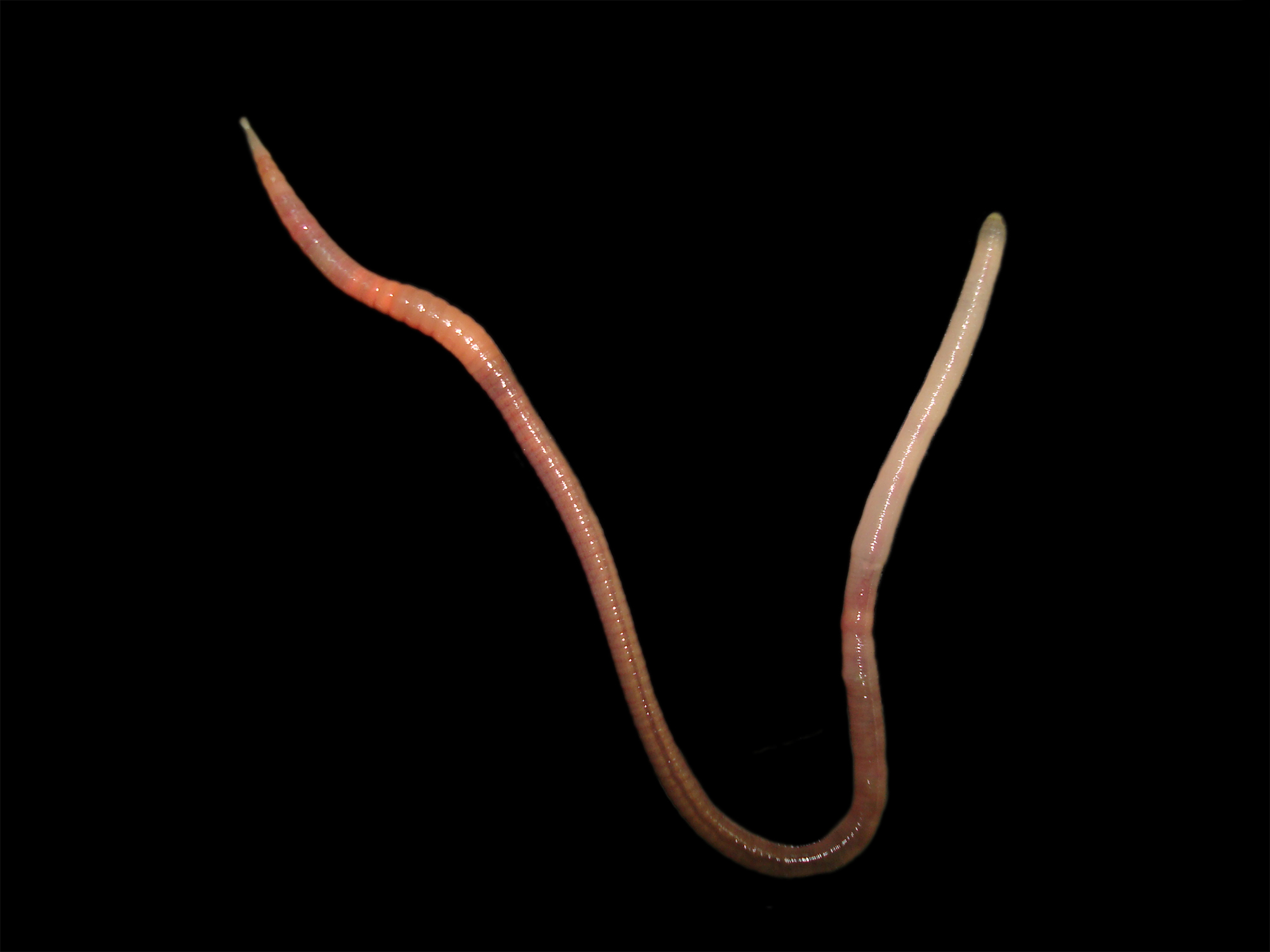

Scientific classification
- Kingdom: Animalia
- Phylum: Annelida
- Clade: Pleistoannelida
- Clade: Sedentaria
- Class: Clitellata
- Order: Opisthopora
- Suborder: Lumbricina
- Family: Glossoscolecidae
- Genus: Pontoscolex
- Species: P. corethrurus

Binomial name
- Pontoscolex corethrurus Muller, 1856

= Pontoscolex corethrurus =

Species of annelid worm

Pontoscolex corethrurus is an earthworm in the genus Pontoscolex. It has a circumtropical distribution, although it originates in the Neotropics, probably in the Guiana Plateau.

== Description ==
The worms are unpigmented and have around 200 segments. Adults measure 5–10 cm (2.0–3.9 in) in length.

== Reproduction ==
It reproduces both parthenogenetically and (rarely) sexually, and under experimental conditions can complete its life cycle in about one year.

== Ecology and habitat ==
The worm thrives in difficult environments with poor nutrition. It is key to emergence of agriculture in the Amazon Basin, where soil is extremely poor. It may have facilitated the formation of terra preta.

On the other hand, the worm's adaptability has allowed it to spread to many disturbed tropical areas, especially urban sites and industrially-farmed areas. It is now considered an invasive species in many parts of the world. An endogeic worm creating globular casts, it is considered responsible for soil compaction in sweet potato fields, in maize fields, and in Amazonian pastures newly converted from forest. This ecosystem engineering also makes it harder for native species to return to their original habitat.

== Decontamination ==
Pontoscolex corethrurus is useful in bioremediation. Studies including Ferreira et al., 2021 find that they combine synergistically with biochar.

== See also ==
- Earthworms as invasive species
