= David Silkenat =

American historian

- Born: United States
- Education: University of North Carolina at Chapel Hill
- Occupations: historian, author
- Scientific career
- Fields: History
- Workplaces: University of Florida

David Silkenat is an American historian, author and academic who specializes in the history of slavery and the American Civil War.

== Biography ==
He was born and raised in New York City.

== Education ==
He attended St. Bernard's School and Choate Rosemary Hall.

He completed his undergraduate degree in History from Duke University in Durham, North Carolina.

He completed his M.A. and PhD degrees in history at the University of North Carolina at Chapel Hill. He studied under W. Fitzhugh Brundage.

== Career ==
For several years, he was a high school history teacher at Episcopal School of Jacksonville.

From 2008 to 2013, he taught at North Dakota State University in Fargo, North Dakota.

From 2013 to 2024, he was Professor of United States History at the University of Edinburgh.

He is currently the Milbauer Chair of Southern History at the University of Florida.

== Awards and honours ==
He is a two-time winner of the North Caroliniana Society Book Prize.

He has been a finalist for the Gilder Lehrman Frederick Douglass Prize and the Gilder Lehrman Abraham Lincoln Prize.

He has served as the Chair of the Scottish Association for the Study of America.

He has served on the editorial boards of the Journal of the Civil War Era and American Nineteenth Century History.

He was a recipient of the 2018-2019 SCRC Research Travel Grant.

== Bibliography ==
He is the author of a number of books:

- Moments of Despair: Suicide, Divorce, and Debt in Civil War Era North Carolina. Chapel Hill: University of North Carolina Press, 2011.
- Driven from Home: North Carolina's Civil War Refugee Crisis. Athens: University of Georgia Press, 2015.
- Raising the White Flag: How Surrender Defined the American Civil War. Chapel Hill: University of North Carolina Press, 2019.
- Scars on the Land: An Environmental History of Slavery in the American South. New York: Oxford University Press, 2022.

== See also ==
- American Civil War
- Sherman's March to the Sea
