= Piero Weiss =

Italian-American pianist and musicologist

Piero Weiss (Trieste, January 26, 1928 – Baltimore, October 2, 2011) was an American pianist and musicologist of Italian Jewish origin. Born in Trieste, his mother was a symphony violinist and the niece of novelist Italo Svevo. In 1938, at the age of 10, he fled Fascist Italy with his family, ending up in New York City in 1940. In New York, he studied piano with Isabella Vengerova and Rudolf Serkin, music theory and composition with Karl Weigl, and chamber music with Adolf Busch. In 1944, at the age of 16, he began his career as a concert pianist. He performed throughout the United States and Europe up into the 1960s, and also performed for radio broadcasts. He recorded works by Debussy. Ravel, Schubert, and Schumann.

== Academia ==
Although he had a substantial career as a pianist, Weiss is chiefly remembered for his work as a scholar and college professor. A specialist in the history of Italian opera, the last of his four books was dedicated to a detailed history of 18th-century Italian opera and is scheduled for release by the Turin publishing house EDT in 2012. He authored three other books, including a widely used college text book, Music in the Western World: A History in Documents (with co-author Richard Taruskin).

Weiss earned a B.A. in music from Columbia University in 1950 and a Ph.D. in musicology from Columbia in 1970. He taught on the music faculty at Columbia from 1964 to 1985. He then joined the faculty of the Peabody Conservatory at Johns Hopkins University, where he founded the music history department in the Fall of 1985. He remained at Peabody until his death 26 years later. He also concurrently taught piano performance at the Curtis Institute in Philadelphia.

== Family ==
He died in Baltimore in 2011, at the age of 83, due to complications of pneumonia. Weiss is survived by Carole Severson Weiss (wife), Maria Leandri (daughter), Antonio Weiss (son), Carlo Weiss (brother), and six grandchildren.
