= Niels Krabbe =

Danish ornithologist

Niels K. Krabbe with an imperial snipe chick

Niels Kaare Krabbe (born 1 July 1951) is a Danish ornithologist and bird conservationist for many years based at the Vertebrate Department of the Zoological Museum, University of Copenhagen and tutored by Jon Fjeldså. His research interests include various aspects of ornithology, especially bioacoustics, conservation, and systematics and altitudinal replacements of Scytalopus tapaculos. He has worked extensively in the Andes, especially Ecuador, and wrote the passerine section of Birds of the High Andes (1990) and the accounts of most Andean species in Threatened Birds of the Americas (1992). He has helped build up a large tissue collection in the Zoological Museum and has authored or coauthored several bioacoustic publications and peer-reviewed papers in scientific journals.

Since 1998 he has worked with Fundación de Conservación Jocotoco on conservation of Ecuadorian birds, paying special attention to the pale-headed brush-finch (Atlapetes pallidiceps), for which he had searched for several years. The species was feared extinct, but he finally found a small population in 1998. Only 10–22 pairs remained, but owing to conservation efforts, it is now recuperating, with c. 100 pairs counted since 2009, when the reserve became saturated with territories.

== Bird species described by or with Niels Krabbe ==
- Choco tapaculo (Scytalopus chocoensis) (1997)
- Chusquea tapaculo (Scytalopus parkeri) (1997)
- Ecuadorian tapaculo or El Oro tapaculo (Scytalopus robbinsi) (1997)
- Jocotoco antpitta (Grallaria ridgelyi) (1999)
- Brown-backed antwren or Yasuni antwren (Myrmotherula fjeldsaai) (1999)
- Foothill elaenia (Myiopagis olallae) (2001)
- Magdalena tapaculo (Scytalopus rodriguezi) (2005)
- Stiles's tapaculo (Scytalopus stilesi) (2005)
- Santa Marta screech-owl (Megascops gilesi) (2017)
- Blue-throated hillstar (Oreotrochilus cyanolaemus) (2018)
- Ampay tapaculo (Scytalopus whitneyi) (2020)
- White-tailed cisticola (Cisticola anderseni) (2021)
- Kilombero cisticola (Cisticola bakerorum) (2021)

== Bird subspecies described by or with Niels Krabbe ==
- Slender-billed miner (Geositta tenuirostris kalimayae) (1992)
- Black-striped sparrow (Arremonops conirostris pastazae) (2008)
- Paramo tapaculo (Scytalopus opacus androstictus) (2010)
- Amazilia hummingbird (Amazilia amazilia azuay) (2010)
- Koepcke's screech-owl (Megascops koepckeae hockingi) (2012)

== Some ornithological taxonomic changes by or with Niels Krabbe ==
- Andean siskin (Sporagra spinescens capitanea) (1994)
- Trilling tapaculo (Scytalopus parvirostris) (1997)
- Long-tailed tapaculo (Scytalopus micropterus) (1997)
- Bolivian tapaculo (Scytalopus bolivianus) (1997)
- White-crowned tapaculo (Scytalopus atratus) (1997)
- Santa Marta tapaculo (Scytalopus sanctaemartae) (1997)
- Silvery-fronted tapaculo (Scytalopus argentifrons chiriquensis) (1997)
- Nariño tapaculo (Scytalopus vicinior) (1997)
- Mérida tapaculo (Scytalopus meridanus) (1997)
- Caracas tapaculo (Scytalopus caracae) (1997)
- Spillmann's tapaculo (Scytalopus spillmanni) (1997)
- White-browed tapaculo (Scytalopus superciliaris) (1997)
- Zimmer's tapaculo (Scytalopus zimmeri) (1997)
- Puna tapaculo (Scytalopus simonsi) (1997)
- Vilcabamba tapaculo (Scytalopus urubambae) (1997)
- Neblina tapaculo (Scytalopus altirostris) (1997)
- Ancash tapaculo (Scytalopus affinis) (1997)
- Paramillo tapaculo (Scytalopus canus) (1997)
- Pale-bellied tapaculo (Scytalopus griseicollis) (1997)
- Dusky tapaculo (Scytalopus fuscus) (1997)
- Tschudi's tapaculo (Scytalopus acutirostris) (1997)
- Blackish tapaculo (Scytalopus latrans) (2001)
- Kalinowski's tinamou (Nothoprocta kalinowskii) (2005)
- Dusky starfrontlet (Coeligena orina) (2005)
- Rufous-vented whitetip (Urosticte ruficrissa) (2006)
- Santa Marta foliage-gleaner (Clibanornis rufipectus) (2008)
- Paramo tapaculo (Scytalopus opacus) (2010)
- Riparian antbird (Cercomacra fuscicauda) (2014)
- Taczanowski's brush-finch (Atlapetes taczanowskii) (2015)
- Choco brushfinch (Atlapetes crassus) (2015)
- Coopmans's elaenia (Elaenia brachyptera) (2015)

== Publications authored or coauthored by Niels Krabbe ==
Books:

- Fjeldså, J. & Krabbe, N. 1990. Birds of the high Andes. Copenhagen: Zoological Museum, University of Copenhagen, and Svendborg, Denmark: Apollo Books.
- Collar, N. J., Gonzaga, L. P., Krabbe, N., Madroño Nieto, A., Naranjo, L. G., Parker III, T. A. & Wege, D. C. 1992. Threatened Birds of the Americas. Cambridge, U.K.: International Council for Bird Preservation.
- Krabbe, N. K. & Schulenberg, T. S. 2003. Families Formicariidae (ground antbirds) and Rhinocryptidae (tapaculos). Pp. 682 – 731 and 748 – 787 in J. del Hoyo, A. Elliott and D. Christie, eds. Handbook of the Birds of the World. Vol. 8. Barcelona, Spain: Lynx Edicions.
