= White-winged tapaculo =

Conservation status
- Not evaluated (IUCN 3.1)

Scientific classification
- Kingdom: Animalia
- Phylum: Chordata
- Class: Aves
- Order: Passeriformes
- Family: Rhinocryptidae
- Genus: Scytalopus
- Species: S. krabbei

Binomial name
- Scytalopus krabbei Schulenberg, Lane, Spencer, Angulo & Cadena, 2020

Species of bird

The white-winged tapaculo (Scytalopus krabbei) is a species of bird in the tapaculo family, Rhinocryptidae. It was described in 2020 by the American ornithologist Tom Schulenberg and his colleagues. It is known only from north-central Peru, where it inhabits wet shrub forest and montane forest. White-winged tapaculos are small and drab birds, being mostly gray in color with brownish, barred upperparts and tails, and a distinctive patch of white on the wing. Adults are 10–11 cm (3.9–4.3 in) long; males weigh 18.0–20.8 g (0.63–0.73 oz) and females weigh 16.5–18.0 g (0.58–0.63 oz). Despite their relatively distinctive appearance, their cryptic nature means that they are typically best identified by their vocalizations.

Most aspects of the white-winged tapaculo's ecology are unknown, but are thought to be similar to other Scytalopus tapaculos. Like other tapaculos, it is highly secretive and mouse-like in its behavior. The white-winged tapaculo has not yet been evaluated and assigned a conservation status by the International Union for Conservation of Nature, but the authors of the study describing it suggested that it be classified as being of least concern.

== Taxonomy ==
The Magellanic tapaculo complex is a group of over a dozen described species of tapaculo that inhabit high elevations in the Andes. Before the white-winged tapaculo's description, tapaculos in this complex that lived in the Cordillera de Colán were thought to be neblina tapaculos. Subsequently, genetic data suggesting that the neblina tapaculo represented two distinct lineages, as well as an individual of the Magellanic tapaculo complex with vocalizations unlike those of the neblina tapaculo, was obtained. This spurred further research into the taxonomy of this complex, resulting in the description of the white-winged tapaculo. The species was described in 2020 as Scytalopus krabbei by the American ornithologist Tom Schulenberg and his colleagues on the basis of an adult male specimen collected from the Alto Mayo Protection Forest in 2002. The species was accepted by the South American Classification Committee of the American Ornithological Society in July 2020 and by the International Ornithologists' Union (IOU) in January 2021.

The name of the genus, Scytalopus, is derived from the Ancient Greek words skutalē or skutalon, meaning 'stick' or 'cudgel', and pous, meaning 'foot'. The specific epithet honors the Danish ornithologist Niels Krabbe for his contributions to the study of Scytalopus tapaculos, including the description of seven new species of the genus. 'White-winged tapaculo' is the official common name designated by the IOU. The name refers to the unique wing-patch seen in all individuals of the species.

The white-winged tapaculo is one of 49 species currently recognized in the genus Scytalopus, in the tapaculo family, Rhinocryptidae. It has no subspecies; populations from Huánuco and Amazonas show a divergence of 4.3–4.4% in their ND2 sequence, but there are no known accompanying differences in their appearance and vocalizations. Within the genus, the species is part of the Magellanic tapaculo complex. Phylogenetic reconstructions based on mitochondrial DNA have found it to be sister (most closely related) to the Ancash tapaculo. These two species are together sister to a clade formed by the Paramo and Paramillo tapaculos. The following cladogram shows relationships among these species according to the 2020 study describing the white-winged tapaculo:

- - - Paramillo tapaculo (S. canus)
    - Paramo tapaculo (S. opacus)
  - - Ancash tapaculo (S. affinis)
    - White-winged tapaculo (S. krabbei)

== Description ==
Like other Scytalopus tapaculos, white-winged tapaculos are small and drab birds. They are mostly gray in color, with brownish, barred upperparts and tails; their most distinctive feature is the small patch of white on the wing, which is unique among tapaculos in their genus. The average adult length is 10 to 11 cm (3.9 to 4.3 in). Males have a mass of 18.0–20.8 g (0.63–0.73 oz), while females are smaller and weigh 16.5–18.0 g (0.58–0.63 oz). The wings are 54–61 mm (2.1–2.4 in) long, bills are 5.2–6.9 mm (0.20–0.27 in) long, and the tarsi are 22.5–25.8 mm (0.89–1.02 in) long. Tails are 36.8–40.8 mm (1.45–1.61 in) long in males and 35.8–41.1 mm (1.41–1.62 in) long in females.

In males, the crown (top of the head) and mantle (upper back) are dark gray, making an indistinct scaled pattern and darkening away from the head. The region around the eyes is blackish. The lower back, rump, and uppertail coverts are dark brown, the last of which has two or three oblique blackish stripes near the end. The tail is dark brown with indistinct dark bars, while the distal halves of the central rectrices have black edges. The underparts are dark gray, slightly lighter than the upperside. The flanks and undertail coverts are dark yellowish brown with uniform dark bars around 1.4 mm (0.055 in) thick. The wings have a small white patch made by the white outer webs of two or three greater primary coverts. The bill is slate-black, the iris is dark brown, and the legs are reddish-brown. Females differ from males in their paler, more yellowish-brown color, paler legs, and more extensive brown-and-dusky barring on the flanks. Two birds assumed to be subadult males had dark brown crowns and mantles, as well as more extensive white on the wings; like other tapaculos, white-winged tapaculos are thought to reach their adult plumage only after several molts.

Scytalopus tapaculos are very similar in their appearance and are thus usually best identified by a combination of vocalizations, distribution, and elevation. However, the white-winged tapaculo's white wing-patch distinguishes it from all other tapaculos, excluding some males of the Loja tapaculo, which does not co-occur with the white-winged tapaculo. It can be told apart from the neblina tapaculo by its larger size, thinner bill, the absence of a whitish supercilium, and dusky (instead of brownish) tail. It also has a grayer, less brownish head, mantle, throat, and breast, as well as less noticeable barring on the rump and back. The white-winged tapaculo can be differentiated from Tschudi's tapaculo by the former's lighter gray color, brown and barred flanks, and dusky (instead of blackish) tail. It is distinguished from the trilling tapaculo by its shorter tail and tarsi, darker gray coloration, and barred flanks.

=== Vocalizations ===
Unlike some other tapaculos in its genus, the white-winged tapaculo is known to give only one type of song. The song comprises a sequence of regular, repeated churrs, made at a rate of 3.8–5.5 per second. This is faster than the churred songs of the Ancash and neblina tapaculos, but slower than those of the paramillo and diademed tapaculos. Churrs are 0.08–0.12 seconds long and consist of five or six connected, distinctively rattle-like "strokes" that steadily fall in pitch; these strokes are given at a rate of 43–58 per second. In some recordings, the mean pitch of the song remains steady throughout the song, but in one recording, it falls eight half notes over the first quarter of the songs before stabilizing. The loudest pitch of recorded songs is known to vary from 3,332 to 3,902 hertz. The species also gives a "scold" call, a unique one second-long trill comprising 9–12 notes delivered at a maximum pitch of 3200–3900 hertz.

Despite its relatively distinctive appearance, the white-winged tapaculo's cryptic nature means that its vocalizations are typically the best way to identify the species. Vocal data has also played a crucial role in determining the distinctness of this species; white-winged tapaculos respond aggressively to vocalizations by others of the same species, but ignore playback of neblina tapaculos.

== Distribution and habitat ==
The white-winged tapaculo is known only from north-central Peru, where it has been recorded from five localities in three regions of the Andes: Cordillera Colán in Amazonas, Cerro Patricia in San Martín, and in Huánuco, in Bosque Unchog and between Zapatagocha and Huaylaspampa. It is likely also present in the remote and poorly-explored region north of Río Huallaga along the eastern slope of the Andes. It inhabits wet shrub forest and montane forest, but might prefer shrub-line vegetation interspersed with open tussock grassland in areas where it occurs alongside Tschudi's tapaculo. It has been recorded at elevations of 2,775 to 3,500 m (9,100 to 11,000 ft), but is commonest between 2,900 to 3,100 m (9,500 to 10,200 ft). It is presumed to be non-migratory.

== Ecology and conservation ==
Most aspects of the white-winged tapaculo's ecology are unknown, but are thought to be similar to other Scytalopus tapaculos. Like other tapaculos, it is highly secretive and mouse-like in its behavior. It is known to feed on insects.

The white-winged tapaculo has not yet been evaluated and assigned a conservation status by the International Union for Conservation of Nature, but the authors of the study describing it suggested that it be classified as being of least concern. It is a restricted-range species and only occurs in mountain ranges within the North-east Peruvian cordilleras Endemic Bird Area, which is relatively unthreatened. It is known to occur in the protected areas of Alto Mayo Protection Forest and Cordillera de Colán National Sanctuary, where it is common in suitable habitat. Further south in Huánuco, where it occurs alongside the neblina tapaculo, the species is thought to be more uncommon or localized.
