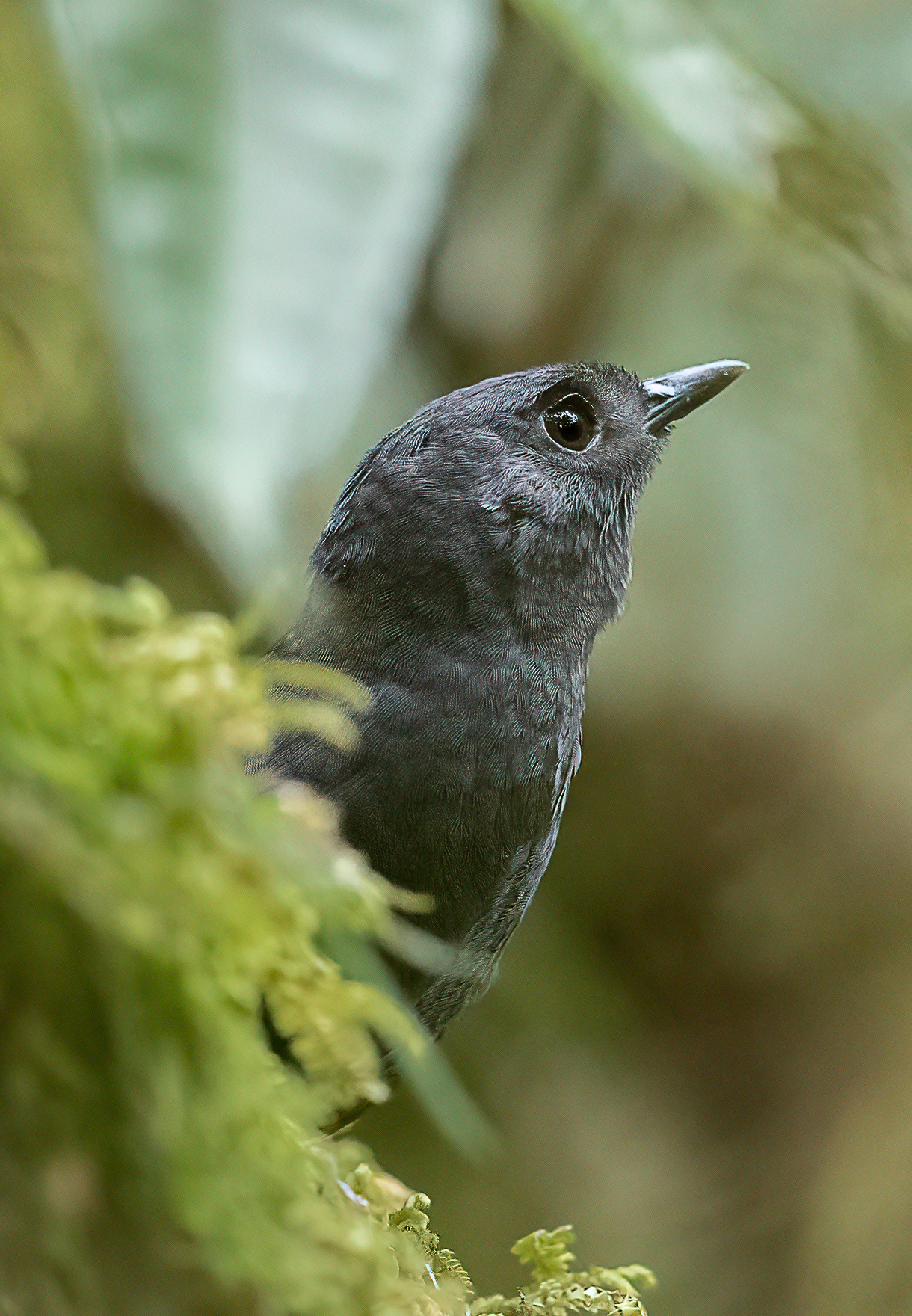

Conservation status
- Near Threatened (IUCN 3.1)

Scientific classification
- Kingdom: Animalia
- Phylum: Chordata
- Class: Aves
- Order: Passeriformes
- Family: Rhinocryptidae
- Genus: Scytalopus
- Species: S. alvarezlopezi

Binomial name
- Scytalopus alvarezlopezi Stiles, Laverde-R, O & Cadena, 2017

= Tatama tapaculo =

Species of bird

The Tatama tapaculo (Scytalopus alvarezlopezi) is a species of bird in the family Rhinocryptidae. It is endemic to western Colombia.

== Taxonomy and systematics ==
Though the Tatama tapaculo was first discovered in 1992, it was not formally described until 2017. The South American Classification Committee of the American Ornithological Society accepted it as a new species in May 2019. The International Ornithological Committee followed suit in June 2019, and the Clements taxonomy in July 2019. Its closest relative is the El Oro tapaculo (Scytalopus robbinsi); those two species, Stiles's tapaculo (S. stilesi), and Magdalena tapaculo (S. rodriguezi) form a distinctive clade.

The specific epithet honors Colombian ornithologist Humberto Álvarez-López. The English name is taken from Cerro Tatamá, the highest peak in the mountains where the Tatama tapaculo lives.

== Description ==
The Tatama tapaculo is almost entirely black, though the underparts are grayish black and the rump has a tinge of dark brown. The flanks and lower abdomen have indistinct bars. Its overall length is about 12 cm (4.7 in) and two males weighed 24.0 and 25.4 g (0.85 and 0.90 oz).

== Distribution and habitat ==
The Tatama tapaculo is found primarily on the west side of the West Andes of Colombia, though it "spills over" to the east side of some ridges. It inhabits dense undergrowth in primary cloud forest but shuns secondary forest. On the west side, it is found from about 1,300 to 1,750 m (4,270 to 5,740 ft) elevation, but on the east side it can be found as high as 2,200 m (7,200 ft).

== Behavior ==
=== Feeding ===
Stiles et al (2017) provide the only information. The Tatama tapaculo forages for arthropods in leaf litter while walking and hopping on the ground, and also flutters up to a half meter above the ground to pick prey from foliage.

=== Breeding ===
Both the holotype and paratype of the Tatama tapaculo had enlarged gonads, which Stiles et al (2017) suggest means that the species breeds in the northern summer, when rainfall is at its lowest.

=== Vocalization ===
The Tatama tapaculo's song is "a seemingly endless, machine-like series of short, unmodulated, frog-like phrases, each involving c. 7–9 nearly identical notes, which can be repeated up to 1.5 minutes, or more" .

== Status ==
The IUCN has assessed the Tatama tapaculo as Near Threatened. Its population size and trend are not well known, its range is small, and it appears to be distributed as several sub-populations.
