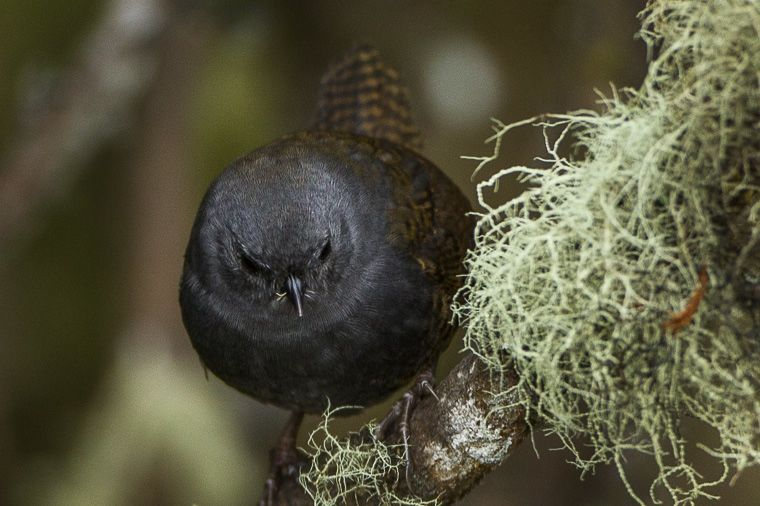

Conservation status
- Least Concern (IUCN 3.1)

Scientific classification
- Kingdom: Animalia
- Phylum: Chordata
- Class: Aves
- Order: Passeriformes
- Family: Rhinocryptidae
- Genus: Scytalopus
- Species: S. opacus

Binomial name
- Scytalopus opacus J. T. Zimmer, 1941

Synonyms
- Scytalopus canus opacus

= Paramo tapaculo =

Species of bird

The Paramo tapaculo (Scytalopus opacus) is a species of bird in the family Rhinocryptidae. It is found in the Andes of Ecuador and southern Colombia.

== Taxonomy and systematics ==
The Paramo tapaculo was originally described as a subspecies of Magellanic tapaculo (Scytalopus magellanicus) and then as a subspecies of paramillo tapaculo (S. canus). Krabbe and Cadena (2010) showed that they have very different voices. Based on that data, The South American Classification Committee (SACC) of the American Ornithologists' Union (now the American Ornithological Society, AOS) elevated it to species rank and the International Ornithological Congress (IOC) and Clements taxonomy followed suit.

The Paramo tapaculo is monophyletic. The former subspecies S. o. androstictus was elevated by the SACC to species status as the Loja tapaculo in July 2020 and by the IOC in January 2021.

== Description ==
The Paramo tapaculo resembles other Scytalopus tapaculos. It is approximately 10.5 cm (4.1 in) long. Males weigh 13.9 to 17.9 g (0.49 to 0.63 oz) and females 13.4 to 16 g (0.47 to 0.56 oz). Males are very dark gray above and medium to dark gray on most of the underside. The flanks and vent area are tawny to dark brown with darker barring. The female is brown above and pale to medium gray on most of the underside. Like the male it has brownish flanks and vent area. The juveniles are highly variable, but generally have shades of brown and barring above and shades of gray and buff below with or without barring.

== Distribution and habitat ==
The Paramo tapaculo ranges the central Andes from southern Colombia to south-central Ecuador. It generally inhabits shrub and scrublands at and above treeline but can also be found in Polylepis woodland and high elevation humid forest. Its elevation range is typically between 3,050 and 4,000 m (10,010 and 13,120 ft). It is believed to be sedentary.

== Behavior ==
The Paramo tapaculo forages on and near the ground for small arthropods and occasionally for berries.

Little is known about the Paramo tapaculo's breeding phenology. Females with brood patches and juveniles have been collected in March, May, and November.

== Status ==
The IUCN has rated the Paramo tapaculo as being of Least Concern. Its range spans approximately 188,000 km^{2} (72,600 mi^{2}). Its population has not been determined but is believed to be stable. The species is fairly common and it occurs in several protected areas in both Colombia and Ecuador.
