= Unicolored tapaculo =

Conservation status
- Near Threatened (IUCN 3.1)

Scientific classification
- Kingdom: Animalia
- Phylum: Chordata
- Class: Aves
- Order: Passeriformes
- Family: Rhinocryptidae
- Genus: Scytalopus
- Species: S. unicolor

Binomial name
- Scytalopus unicolor Salvin, 1895

Species of bird

The unicolored tapaculo (Scytalopus unicolor) is a species of bird in the family Rhinocryptidae. It is endemic to Peru.

== Taxonomy and systematics ==
The unicolored tapaculo is monotypic. However, it previously included blackish tapaculo (Scytalopus latrans) and trilling tapaculo (S. parvirostris) as subspecies.

== Description ==
The unicolored tapaculo is 10.5 cm (4.1 in) long. The male is gray, darker above and lighter below. Its rear (above and below) sometimes has a slightly light brown wash. The female is similar but the brown wash is more often darker. The immature is brown above and dull yellowish below, with spots and bars on the belly and flanks respectively.

== Distribution and habitat ==
The unicolored tapaculo is found only in southern Cajamarca Department and La Libertad Department of northwestern Peru. It inhabits the dense understory of humid montane forest on the east side of the Andes at elevations of 2,000 to 3,170 m (6,560 to 10,400 ft).

== Behavior ==
The unicolored tapaculo's diet is unknown as are its foraging and breeding phenologies. Its song is a short series of notes whose pace increases . Its call is a single note .

== Status ==
The IUCN has assessed the unicolored tapaculo as being near threatened. However, although it is fairly common within its very small range and appears to tolerate disturbance, its habitat is very fragmented and at risk from fire. It "probably merits the conservation status of Near-threatened, or even that of Vulnerable."
