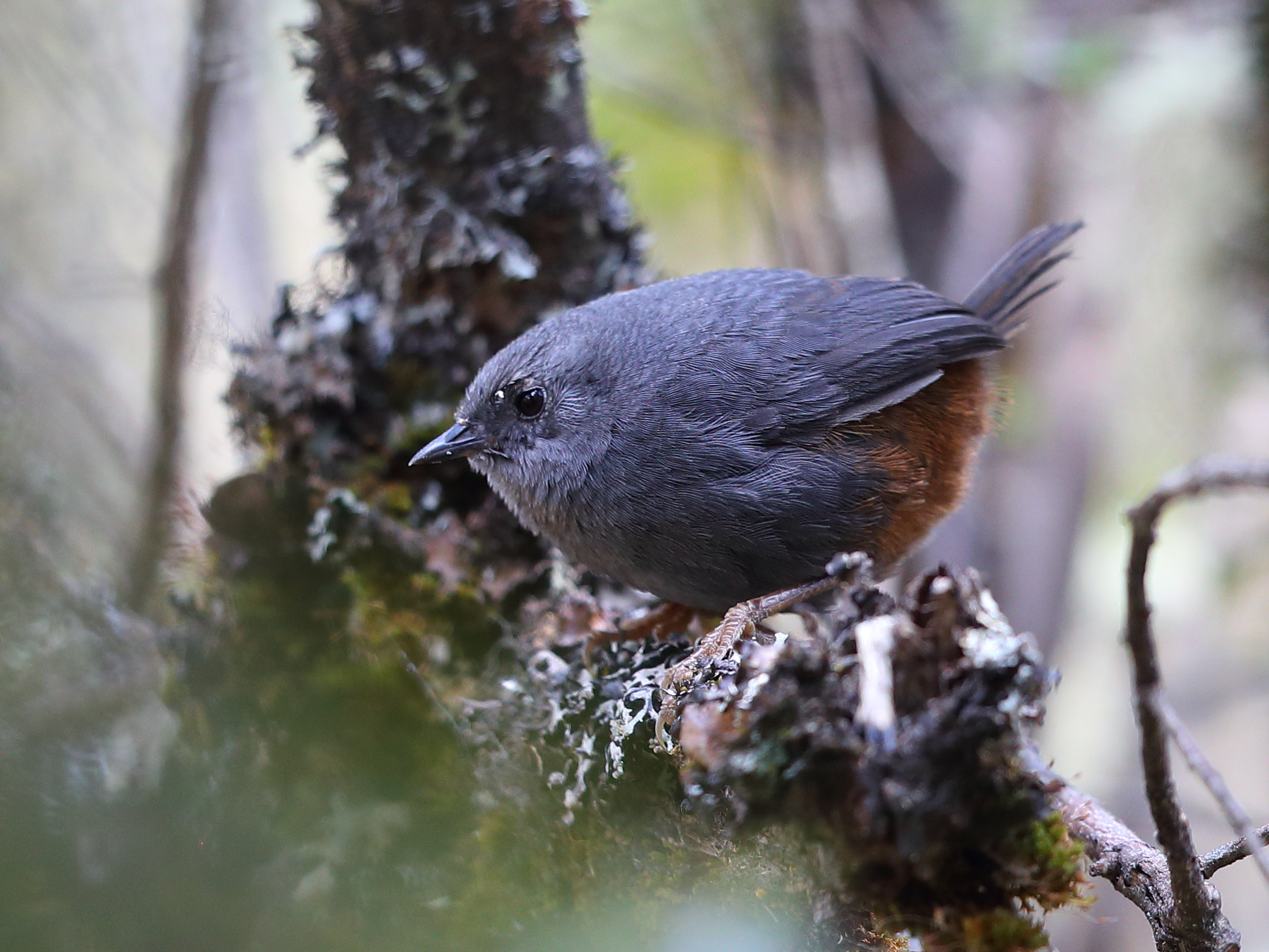

Conservation status
- Least Concern (IUCN 3.1)

Scientific classification
- Kingdom: Animalia
- Phylum: Chordata
- Class: Aves
- Order: Passeriformes
- Family: Rhinocryptidae
- Genus: Scytalopus
- Species: S. urubambae

Binomial name
- Scytalopus urubambae Zimmer, 1939

= Vilcabamba tapaculo =

Species of bird

The Vilcabamba tapaculo (Scytalopus urubambae) is a small passerine bird in the family Rhinocryptidae. It is endemic to Peru.

== Taxonomy and systematics ==
The Vilcabamba tapaculo was originally described as Scytalopus magellanicus urubambae, a subspecies of Magellanic tapaculo. Following a study published in 1997, it was elevated to species rank because of differences in their vocalizations.

== Description ==
The Vilcabamba tapaculo is 10 to 12 cm (3.9 to 4.7 in) long; one male weighed 13 g (0.46 oz). It is a wren-like bird with a slender bill and fairly long legs. The tail is short and held erect. The male's upper parts are dark gray and the chest medium gray merging to pale gray on the belly. The rump is reddish brown with faint bars. The flanks and vent area are cinnamon, also with faint bars. The female is similar, but the upper parts' gray is paler and the neck has a brown wash. The flanks are a brighter reddish brown and do not have bars. The juvenile's upper parts are brown with the back darker than the rump. The breast and belly are a greenish buff and the flanks and vent area a yellowish buff.

== Distribution and habitat ==
The Vilcabamba tapaculo is found only in the upper Urubamba Valley in southern Peru's Department of Cuzco. In elevation it ranges from 3,500 to 4,200 m (11,500 to 13,800 ft). Its habitat is "humid montane and elfin forest, often in areas dominated by moss and boulders".

== Behavior ==
The Vilcabamba tapaculo's diet and feeding behavior have not been described, nor has its breeding behavior. They are assumed to be similar to those of other high-elevation tapaculos.

The Vilcabamba tapaculo's song has been described as "chree-chree-chree-chree" by D.F. Lane, as "a raspy chit-chit", and as "a churr". Its call is "a rising and falling kikikikiki". Examples are here

== Status ==
The IUCN has assessed the Vilcabamba tapaculo as being of Least Concern. Though it has a very small range, its population is thought to be stable and not immediately threatened by human activity.
