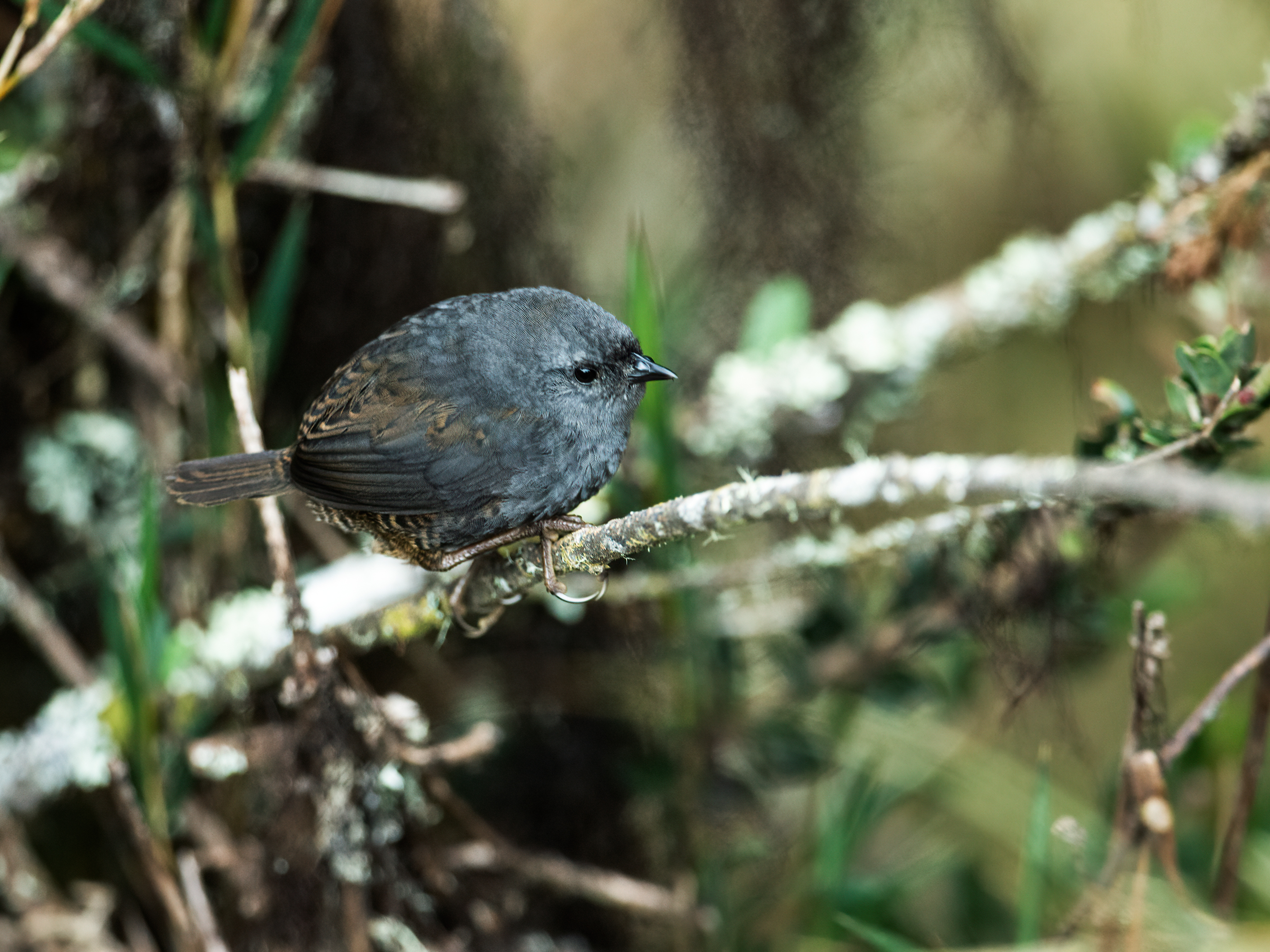

Conservation status
- Least Concern (IUCN 3.1)

Scientific classification
- Kingdom: Animalia
- Phylum: Chordata
- Class: Aves
- Order: Passeriformes
- Family: Rhinocryptidae
- Genus: Scytalopus
- Species: S. altirostris

Binomial name
- Scytalopus altirostris Zimmer, 1939

= Neblina tapaculo =

Species of bird

The neblina tapaculo (Scytalopus altirostris) is a species of bird in the family Rhinocryptidae. It is endemic to the Andes of northern Peru.

== Taxonomy and systematics ==
The neblina tapaculo was originally described as Scytalopus magellanicus altirostris, a subspecies of Magellanic tapaculo. Following a study published in 1997, it was elevated to species rank because of differences in their vocalizations.

== Description ==
The neblina tapaculo is 10 to 12 cm (3.9 to 4.7 in) long and weighs 17 to 22 g (0.60 to 0.78 oz). The adult male is gray above with a brown wash on the neck. The lower back and rump are brown with black bars. The underparts are a paler gray than the upper parts and the flanks and crissum (the area around the cloaca) are tawny with black bars. The adult female is similar but the upperparts are more brown than gray.

== Distribution and habitat ==
The neblina tapaculo is found in the Eastern Cordillera of Peru's northern Andes, roughly between southern Amazonas and central Huánuco Departments. It is resident on the eastern slope at elevations from 2,900 to 3,700 m (9,500 to 12,100 ft). There it inhabits elfin forest and the edge between the forest and adjacent páramo grasslands. It is a very wet environment, and the species' name "neblina" is Spanish for mist, a characteristic of the species' habitat.

== Behavior ==
Little is known about the neblina tapaculo's diet and foraging phenology, though the species is assumed to be insectivorous. The only information about its breeding biology is that a juvenile was noted in July.

The neblina tapaculo's song is described as "a rapid series...of descending, dry churring phrases: djrr djrr djrr djrr djrr djrr" by D.F. Lane in Schulenberg et al. (2010). as in this example

== Status ==
The IUCN has assessed the neblina tapaculo as being of Least Concern.
