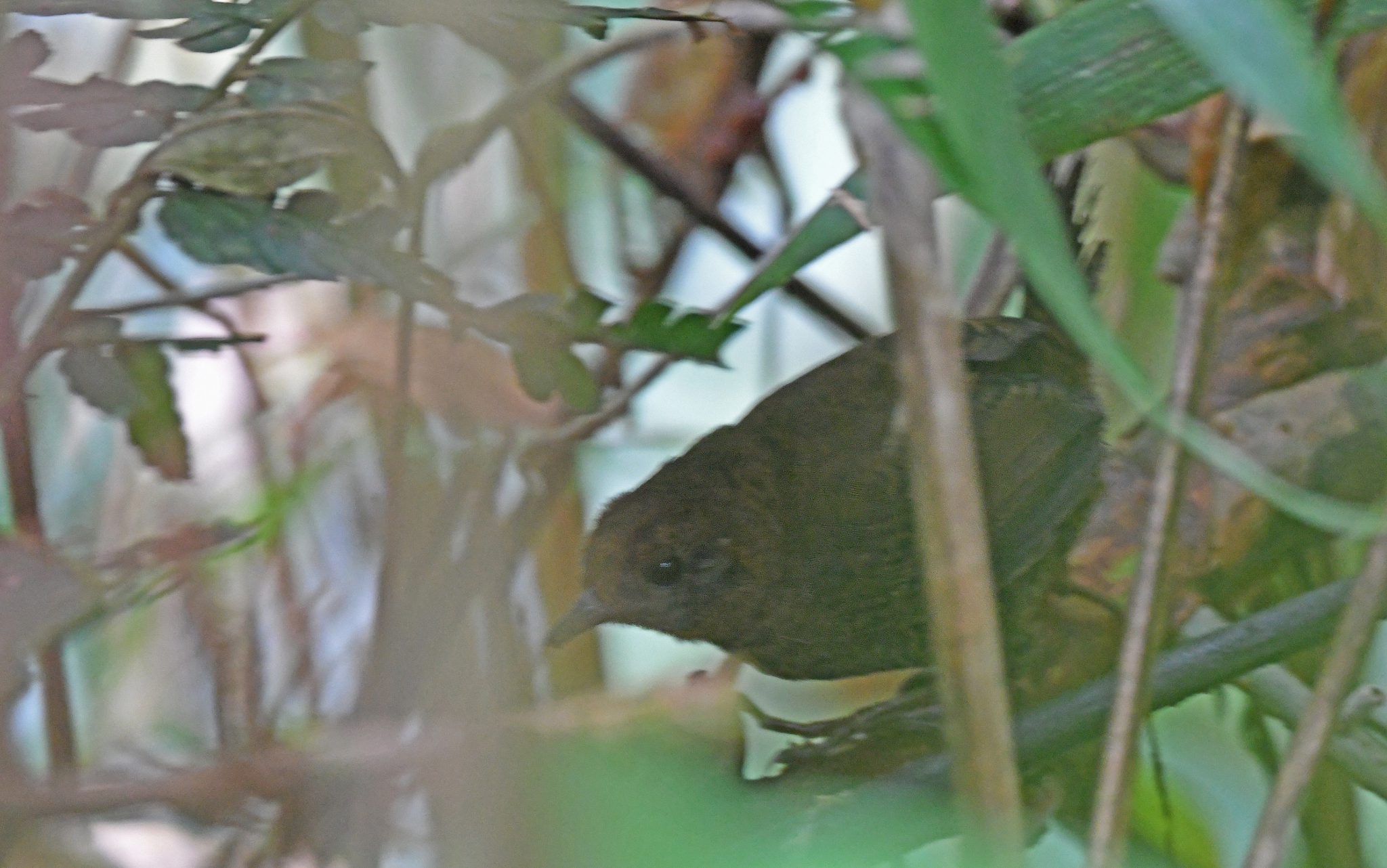
- in Antioquia, Colombia

Conservation status
- Least Concern (IUCN 3.1)

Scientific classification
- Kingdom: Animalia
- Phylum: Chordata
- Class: Aves
- Order: Passeriformes
- Family: Rhinocryptidae
- Genus: Scytalopus
- Species: S. stilesi

Binomial name
- Scytalopus stilesi Cuervo, Cadena, Krabbe & Renjifo, 2005

= Stiles's tapaculo =

Species of bird

Stiles's tapaculo (Scytalopus stilesi) is a member of the tapaculos, a group of Neotropical birds. It was described as new to science in 2005.

It has been found at 21 sites in montane forest between 1,420 and 2,130 m altitude in the northern Cordillera Central of the Colombian Andes; although having a restricted range, within this limited area it is a common understorey bird. Initially, it seemed as if the species would classify as near threatened (Cuervo et al. 2005), but it turned out to be more plentiful and thus is classified as species of least concern in the 2007 IUCN Red List.

The species was originally observed in the 1990s, but when Niels Krabbe examined recordings of their songs, his suspicions arose that they were a new species - Stiles's tapaculo's song is considerably faster and lower-pitched than that of the closely related Ecuadorian tapaculo S. robbinsi (Cuervo et al. 2005).

The species was named in honour of Frank Gary Stiles, an ornithologist who played a prominent role in research into Neotropical birds in the 1980s and 1990s.
