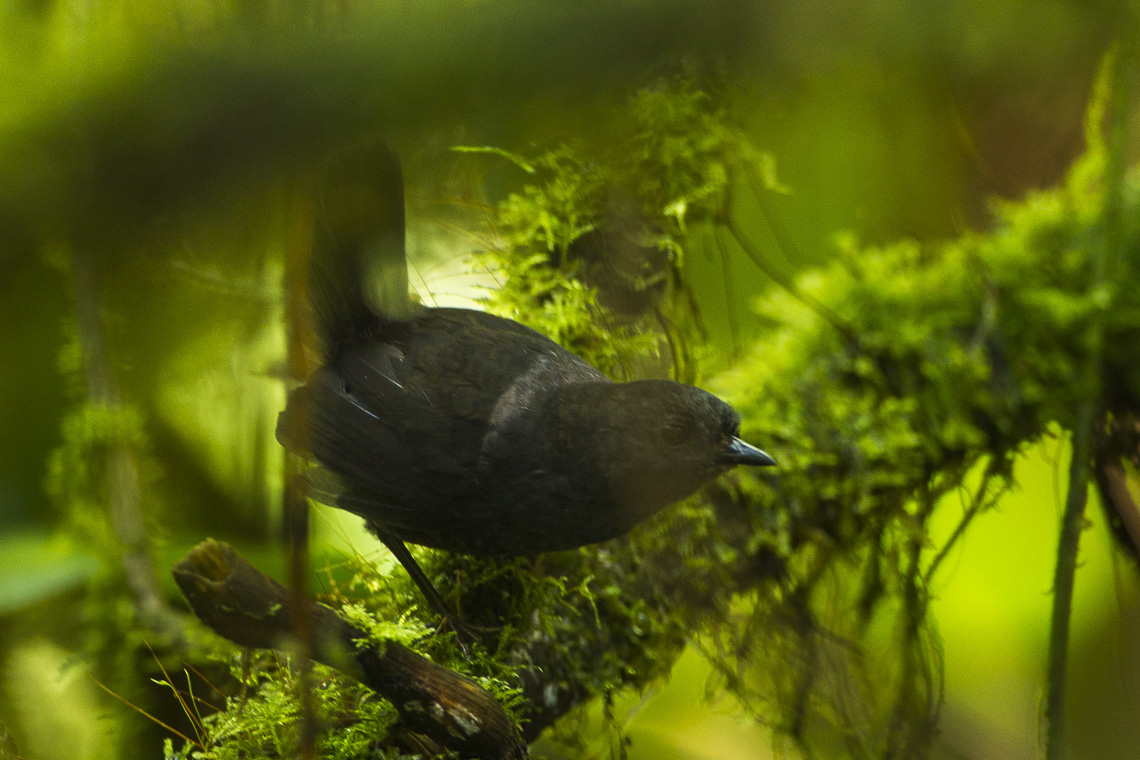

Conservation status
- Least Concern (IUCN 3.1)

Scientific classification
- Kingdom: Animalia
- Phylum: Chordata
- Class: Aves
- Order: Passeriformes
- Family: Rhinocryptidae
- Genus: Scytalopus
- Species: S. vicinior

Binomial name
- Scytalopus vicinior Zimmer, 1939

= Nariño tapaculo =

Species of bird

The Nariño tapaculo (Scytalopus vicinior) is a species of bird in the family Rhinocryptidae. It is found in Colombia and Ecuador.

== Taxonomy and systematics ==
The Nariño tapaculo was originally described as a subspecies of the Tacarcuna tapaculo (Scytalopus panamensis) and was retained there until after Krabbe and Schulenberg (1997) noted "no particular similarity, either in plumage or in voice, between true S. vicinior and S. panamensis".

== Description ==
The Nariño tapaculo looks similar to several other Andean tapaculos. The male's head is dark gray, the back is dark gray or brown, and the rump is cinnamon with dusky bars. The throat, chest, and belly are lighter gray and the flanks and vent area are yellowish brown with blackish bars. The female is similar, but the back is browner, the throat is lighter gray, and the lower belly sometimes yellower.

== Distribution and habitat ==
The Nariño tapaculo is found on the west slope of the Andes from Colombia's Risaralda and Chocó Departments south to southwestern Cotopaxi Province in Ecuador. There it primarily inhabits the understory of moist montane forest and sometimes forest edges. In elevation it generally ranges from 1,250 to 2,000 m (4,100 to 6,560 ft) but can be found as high as 2,350 m (7,710 ft) in Ecuador.

== Behavior ==
The Nariño tapaculo preys on a variety of insects, but little more is known about its feeding phenology. Little is also known about its breeding behavior other than that breeding condition specimens were collected in November, December, and April.

The Nariño tapaculo's song is "a fast series of well-enunciated, ringing notes that starts out with a brief stutter but then may go on for 15-30 seconds, pididi- .

== Status ==
The IUCN has assessed the Nariño tapaculo as being of Least Concern. Despite its somewhat small range and unknown population numbers, both are believed large enough to warrant that classification.
