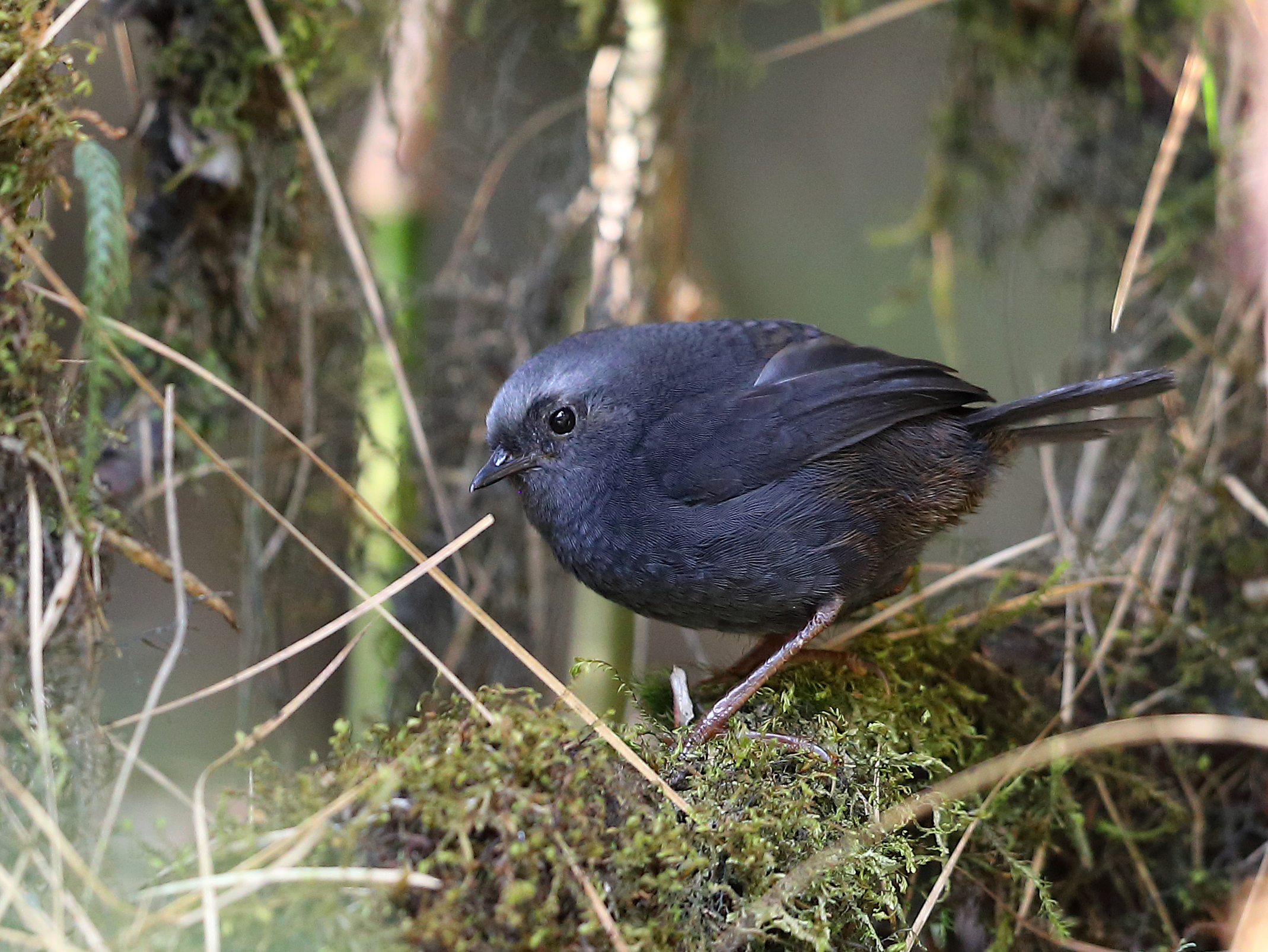

Conservation status
- Least Concern (IUCN 3.1)

Scientific classification
- Kingdom: Animalia
- Phylum: Chordata
- Class: Aves
- Order: Passeriformes
- Family: Rhinocryptidae
- Genus: Scytalopus
- Species: S. schulenbergi

Binomial name
- Scytalopus schulenbergi Whitney, 1994

= Diademed tapaculo =

Species of bird

The diademed tapaculo (Scytalopus schulenbergi) is a species of bird in the family Rhinocryptidae. It is found in Bolivia and Peru.

== Taxonomy and systematics ==
The diademed tapaculo has at various times been thought to be closely related to puna tapaculo (Scytalopus simonsi), Vilcabamba tapaculo (S. urubambae), and silvery-fronted tapaculo (S. argentifrons), though the last appears the least likely.

== Description ==
The diademed tapaculo is 10 cm (3.9 in) long; two males weighed 15.2 and 17 g (0.54 and 0.60 oz). The species gets its name from the males' silvery forecrown and supercilium set off by a black "mask" below the supercilium. The male's upper parts are dark gray washed with brown, and it has an orange red rump with dusky bars. It is gray below, lighter to darker front to rear. The flanks and vent, like the rump, are orange red with dusky bars. The female is similar but the "diadem" is smaller and duller and the upper parts' brown wash is darker. The juvenile is a golden brown that is lighter on the underside and has bars and spots throughout.

== Distribution and habitat ==
The diademed tapaculo's range extends from the Cordillera Vilcanota in Peru's Department of Cuzco southeast to the Cochabamba Department of Bolivia. It is found in bamboo and other dense undergrowth of humid montane forest near tree line, at elevations of 2,800 to 3,400 m (9,200 to 11,200 ft).

== Behavior ==
=== Feeding ===
The diademed tapaculo forages on and near the ground for insects. It moves quickly while gleaning from moss and vegetation and probing mossy branches.

=== Breeding ===
The diademed tapaculo is thought to breed between September and January. The one nest that has been described was a ball of moss and lichens.

=== Vocalization ===
The diademed tapaculo's song is a trill of varying intensity, pitch, and pace lasting up to 15 seconds . Its scold call is a series of soft notes that lasts about a second .

== Status ==
The IUCN has assessed the diademed tapaculo as being of Least Concern. Though its population size has not been determined, it appears to be stable. The species occurs in several protected areas.
