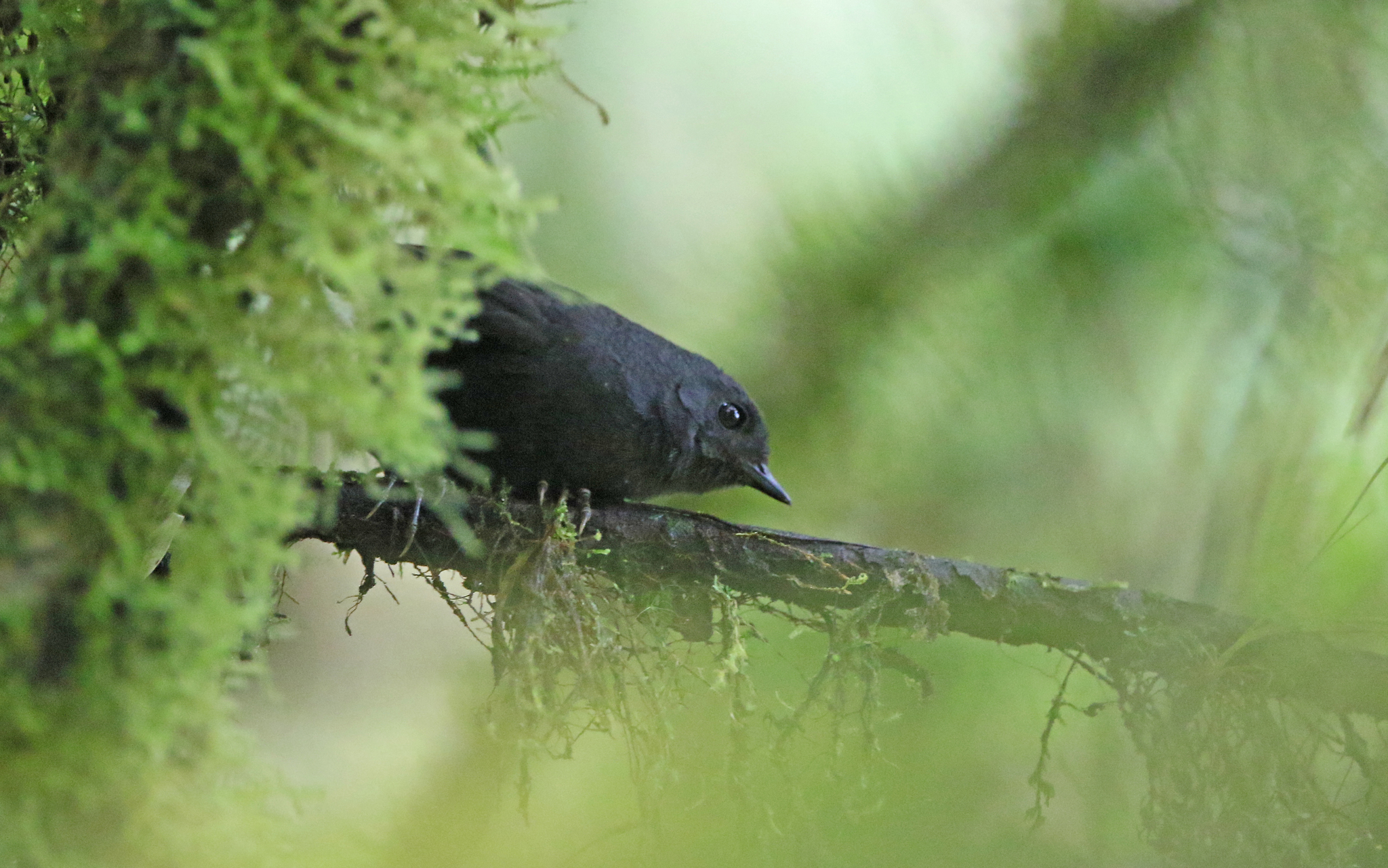

Conservation status
- Least Concern (IUCN 3.1)

Scientific classification
- Kingdom: Animalia
- Phylum: Chordata
- Class: Aves
- Order: Passeriformes
- Family: Rhinocryptidae
- Genus: Scytalopus
- Species: S. spillmanni

Binomial name
- Scytalopus spillmanni Stresemann, 1937

= Spillmann's tapaculo =

Species of bird

Spillmann's tapaculo (Scytalopus spillmanni) is a species of bird in the family Formicariidae. It inhabits the Andes of Colombia and Ecuador.

== Taxonomy and systematics ==
The Spillmann's tapaculo was previously considered a subspecies of brown-rumped tapaculo (Scytalopus latebircola) but was elevated to species rank due to differences in their vocalizations. It and chusquea tapaculo (S. parkeri) form a superspecies. The population in Colombia's eastern Andes might be different enoung to be a subspecies.

== Description ==
Spillmann's tapaculo is 12 cm (4.7 in) long. Males weigh 21 to 30 g (0.74 to 1.06 oz) and females 20 to 29.5 g (0.71 to 1.04 oz). The male is blackish gray above with a dark brown rump. It is lighter gray below with tawny to cinnamon flanks and vent area. Some females are like the male, but most have the upperparts heavily washed with brown and an orange lower belly. The juvenile is brown above and dusky below, with barring above and below.

== Distribution and habitat ==
Spillmann's tapaculo is found in all three Andean ranges of Colombia and south into Ecuador. In the west it extends to Cotopaxi Province and in the east into Morona-Santiago Province. It inhabits the undergrowth of humid montane forest and is especially partial to Chusquea bamboo. It ranges generally from 1,900 to 3,200 m (6,200 to 10,500 ft) but is found locally up to 3,500 m (11,500 ft) and as high as 3,700 m (12,100 ft) in western Napo Province, Ecuador.

== Behavior ==
=== Feeding ===
Spillmann's tapaculo forages on the ground or near it, mostly for small insects.

=== Breeding ===
Little is known about the breeding phenology of Spillmann's tapaculo, but it probably breeds throughout the year.

=== Vocalization ===
The song of Spillmann's tapaculo is a 10 to 20 second trill whose volume and sometime pitch increase . The male and female have several calls such as , , and .

== Status ==
The IUCN has assessed Spillmann's tapaculo as being of Least Concern. It has a very large range and appears to be common throughout it.
