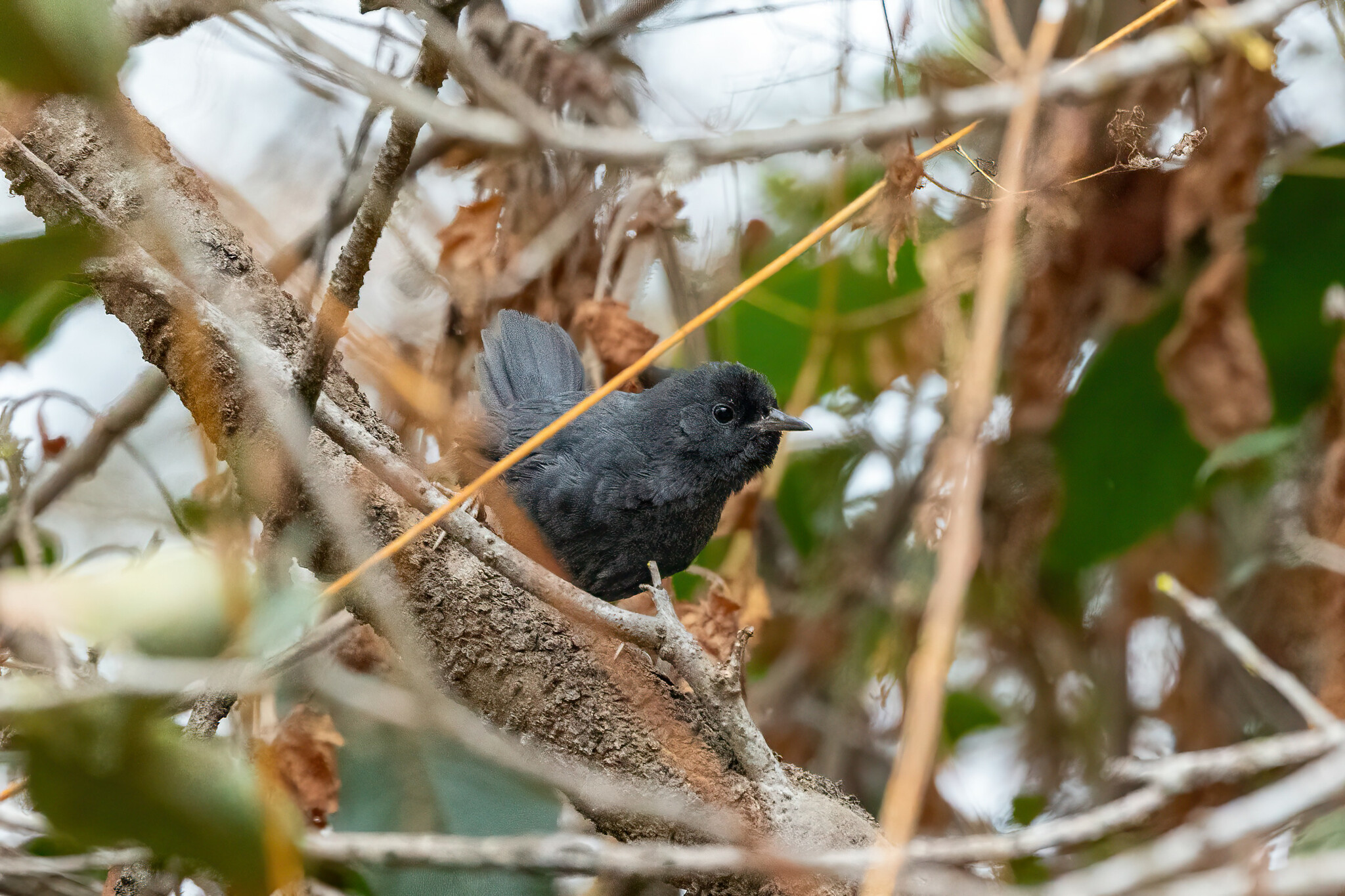
- Dusky tapaculo, Olmué, Chile

Conservation status
- Least Concern (IUCN 3.1)

Scientific classification
- Kingdom: Animalia
- Phylum: Chordata
- Class: Aves
- Order: Passeriformes
- Family: Rhinocryptidae
- Genus: Scytalopus
- Species: S. fuscus

Binomial name
- Scytalopus fuscus Gould, 1837

= Dusky tapaculo =

Species of bird

The dusky tapaculo (Scytalopus fuscus) is a species of bird in the family Rhinocryptidae. It is endemic to Chile.

== Taxonomy and systematics ==
The dusky tapaculo was formerly considered a subspecies of Magellanic tapaculo (Scytalopus magellanicus). Following 1997 and 2003 publications, it was raised to species status because of vocal differences and because the two are sympatric over part of their ranges.

== Description ==
The dusky tapaculo is 11 cm (4.3 in) long. It is essentially gray all over, darker above and lighter below. The lower back and rump have a brown wash and the flanks are sometimes pale tawny brown with black bars.

== Distribution and habitat ==
The dusky tapaculo is found only in central Chile. It ranges from southern Atacama Region south to Biobío Region at elevations from sea level to 800 m (2,600 ft). It inhabits the bottoms of densely vegetated valleys.

== Behavior ==
=== Feeding ===
No information has been published about the dusky tapaculo's diet or foraging behavior.

=== Breeding ===
Little has been published about the dusky tapaculo's breeding phenology. One nest has been described. It was a globe made of root fibers and moss with a horse hair lining, placed at the end of a tunnel 0.6 m (2.0 ft) long.

=== Vocalization ===
The dusky tapaculo's song is a repeated short rising trill .

== Status ==
The IUCN has assessed the dusky tapaculo as being of Least Concern. It is locally fairly common and occurs in at least one protected area. However, its habitat "has been largely destroyed and remains strongly fragmented. This species should probably be monitored".
