= Caracas tapaculo =

Conservation status
- Least Concern (IUCN 3.1)

Scientific classification
- Kingdom: Animalia
- Phylum: Chordata
- Class: Aves
- Order: Passeriformes
- Family: Rhinocryptidae
- Genus: Scytalopus
- Species: S. caracae

Binomial name
- Scytalopus caracae Hellmayr, 1922

Species of bird

The Caracas tapaculo (Scytalopus caracae) is a species of bird in the family Rhinocryptidae. It is endemic to Venezuela.

== Taxonomy and systematics ==
The Caracas tapaculo was previously considered a subspecies of brown-rumped tapaculo (Scytalopus latebricola) but was elevated to species status based on differences in their vocalizations.

== Description ==
The Caracas tapaculo is 11.5 cm (4.5 in) long and weighs approximately 24 g (0.85 oz). The adult has dark gray upperparts, a tawny rump, and a paler gray throat and breast. The flanks and crissum (the area around the cloaca) are tawny with dusky barring. The juvenile's plumage has not been described.

== Distribution ==
The Caracas tapaculo is found in the Venezuelan Coastal Range and separately in a small area where Sucre, Anzoátegui, and Monagas States meet. It inhabits the undergrowth of several humid forest types including primary and secondary woodland and their edges. Unlike many other tapaculos, it tends to shun Chusquea bamboo. It ranges in elevation between 1,200 and 2,400 m (3,900 and 7,900 ft).

== Behavior ==
The Caracas tapaculo's feeding and breeding phenologies have not been recorded. Its song is a series of notes rising and then falling in both volume and pitch . It scolds with a wheezy chatter .

== Status ==
The IUCN has assessed the Caracas tapaculo as being of Least Concern. Although its population size has not been determined, it is thought to be fairly common. Much of the larger western part of its range is within protected areas but the smaller eastern area is suffering deforestation.
