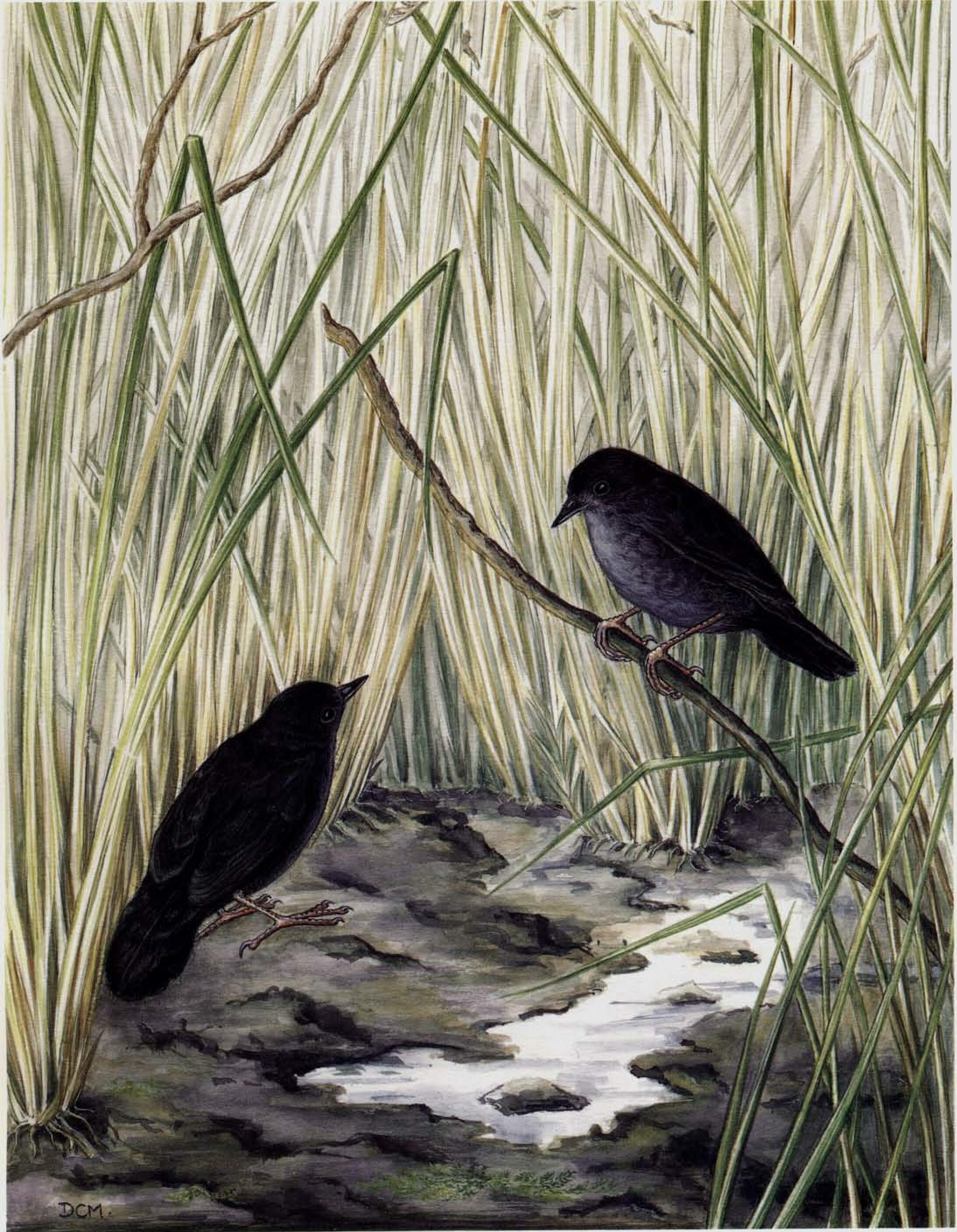

Conservation status
- Vulnerable (IUCN 3.1)

Scientific classification
- Kingdom: Animalia
- Phylum: Chordata
- Class: Aves
- Order: Passeriformes
- Family: Rhinocryptidae
- Genus: Scytalopus
- Species: S. iraiensis

Binomial name
- Scytalopus iraiensis Bornschein, Reinert & Pichorim, 1998

= Marsh tapaculo =

Species of bird in Brazil

The marsh tapaculo (Scytalopus iraiensis) is a recently discovered passerine bird which belongs to the genus Scytalopus, a genus of tapaculos. It is also known as the wetland tapaculo or tall-grass wetland tapaculo. It is endemic to Brazil.

== Description ==
It is a small, dumpy bird with broad tail-feathers and a total length of approximately 12.5 cm. The upperparts are plain blackish in colour while the underparts are dark grey. The flanks are slightly barred with brown, at least in young birds. The legs are reddish-brown and the bill is dark. The song includes a long series of short 'tchek' notes. The birds run rapidly and will fly short distances when flushed.

== Distribution and habitat ==
It was first sighted on April 19, 1997 in wetlands beside the Iraí River near Curitiba in southern Brazil. Until recently it was generally believed to be restricted to about two dozen sites in the eastern part of Paraná and Rio Grande do Sul, but has now been discovered in the highlands of Minas Gerais – far north of its previously known range.

It occurs in seasonally flooded grassland in the floodplains of rivers. It inhabits areas of tall (60–180 cm), dense vegetation dominated by sedges (such as Eleocharis) and grasses. It forages at or near ground-level and feeds on small arthropods, mainly insects such as bugs and beetles. Breeding occurs in late spring.

== Status and conservation ==
The marsh tapaculo is classified as a Vulnerable species by the IUCN due to its small, declining population (11,200 mature individuals as of 2023) and continuing habitat loss. Threats include drainage, sand extraction, burning of grassland and the flooding of land due to the construction of dams.

== Bibliography ==
- Marcos Ricardo Bornschein; Bianca Luiza Reinert; Mauro Pichorim (1998). "Description, ecology and conservation of a new Scytalopus (Rhinocryptidae) from southern Brazil, with comments on the morphology of the family". Ararajuba (in Brazilian Portuguese). 6 (1). Brazilian Ornithological Society: 3–36. ISSN 0103-5657. Wikidata Q118213272.
- Vasconcelos, M. F.; Lopes, L. E.; Hoffmann, D.; Silveira, L. F. & Schunck, F. (2008) Range extension for Marsh Tapaculo Scytalopus iraiensis to the highlands of Minas Gerais, Brazil, with an overview of the species' distribution. Bull. B.O.C. 128(2): 101–106
