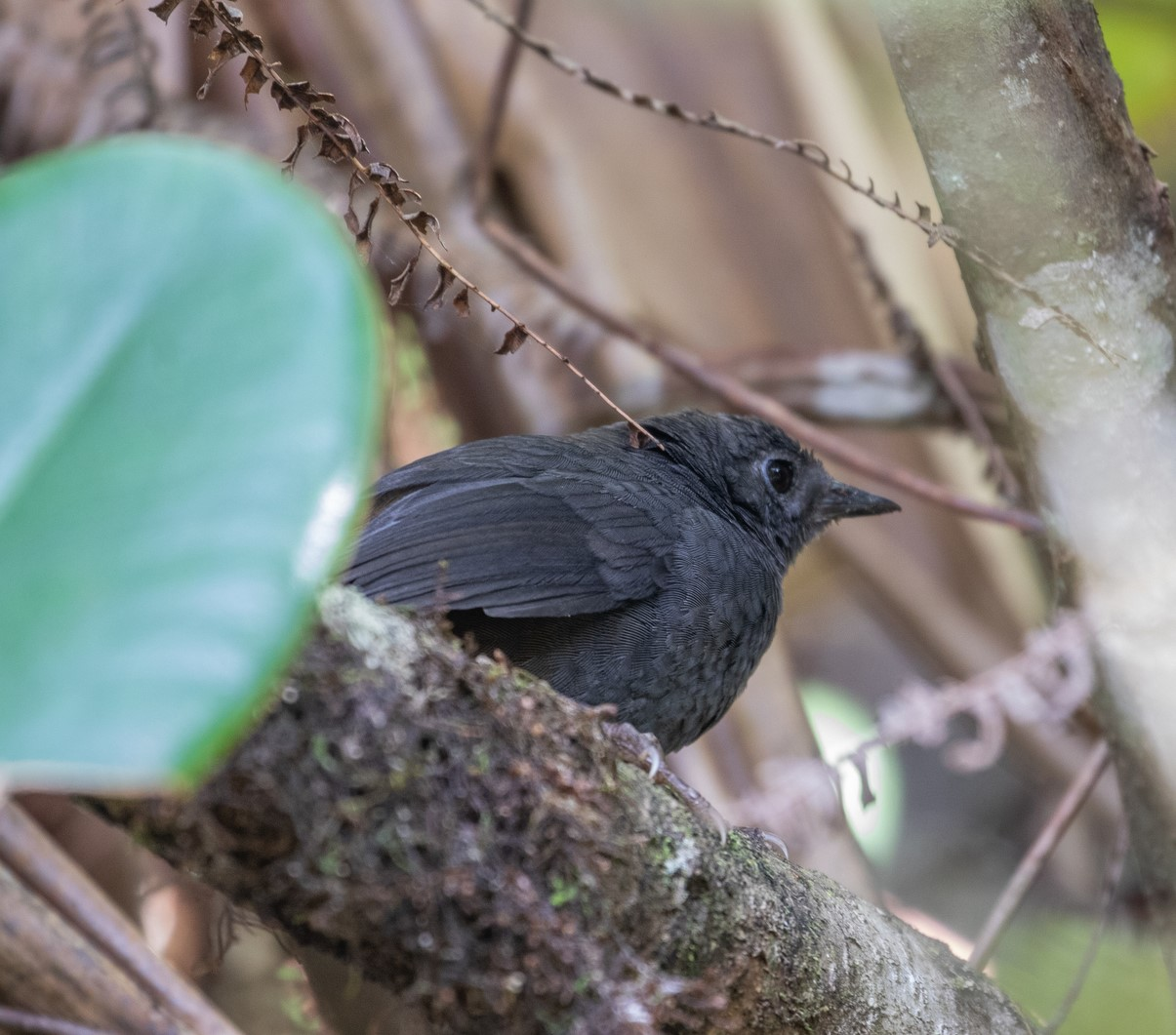
- In Magdalena, Colombia

Conservation status
- Near Threatened (IUCN 3.1)

Scientific classification
- Kingdom: Animalia
- Phylum: Chordata
- Class: Aves
- Order: Passeriformes
- Family: Rhinocryptidae
- Genus: Scytalopus
- Species: S. latebricola

Binomial name
- Scytalopus latebricola Bangs, 1899

= Brown-rumped tapaculo =

Species of bird

The brown-rumped tapaculo (Scytalopus latebricola) is a species of bird in the family Rhinocryptidae. It is endemic to Colombia.

== Taxonomy and systematics ==
The brown-rumped tapaculo is monospecific. However, the Merida tapaculo (Scytalopus meridanus), Caracas tapaculo (S. caracae), and Spillmann's tapaculo (S. spillmanni) were all previously considered subspecies of it.

== Description ==
The brown-rumped tapaculo is 11.5 cm (4.5 in) long. The adult's upper parts are dark brownish gray and the rump is tawny brown. Its throat, breast, and belly are the same hue as the upper parts but paler. The flanks and lower belly are bright reddish chestnut, sometimes with blackish bars. The juvenile is brown with a barred appearance.

== Distribution and habitat ==
The brown-rumped tapaculo is found between 2,000 and 3,660 m (6,560 and 12,010 ft) in the isolated Sierra Nevada de Santa Marta of northern Colombia. It inhabits the dense undergrowth of humid montane forest and secondary forest.

== Behavior ==
=== Feeding ===
The brown-rumped tapaculo is primarily terrestrial but will climb vine-covered tree trunks. Its diet has not been documented but is presumed to be arthropods.

=== Breeding ===
What little is known about the brown-rumped tapaculo's breeding phenology is contradictory. Adults with very worn plumage were collected in July, which suggests they had bred in June. However, immatures have been collected in March while molting into adult plumage.

== Status ==
The IUCN has assessed the brown-rumped tapaculo as Near Threatened; previously it had been rated Least Concern. Though its population is believed to be stable, it has a restricted and fragmented range.
