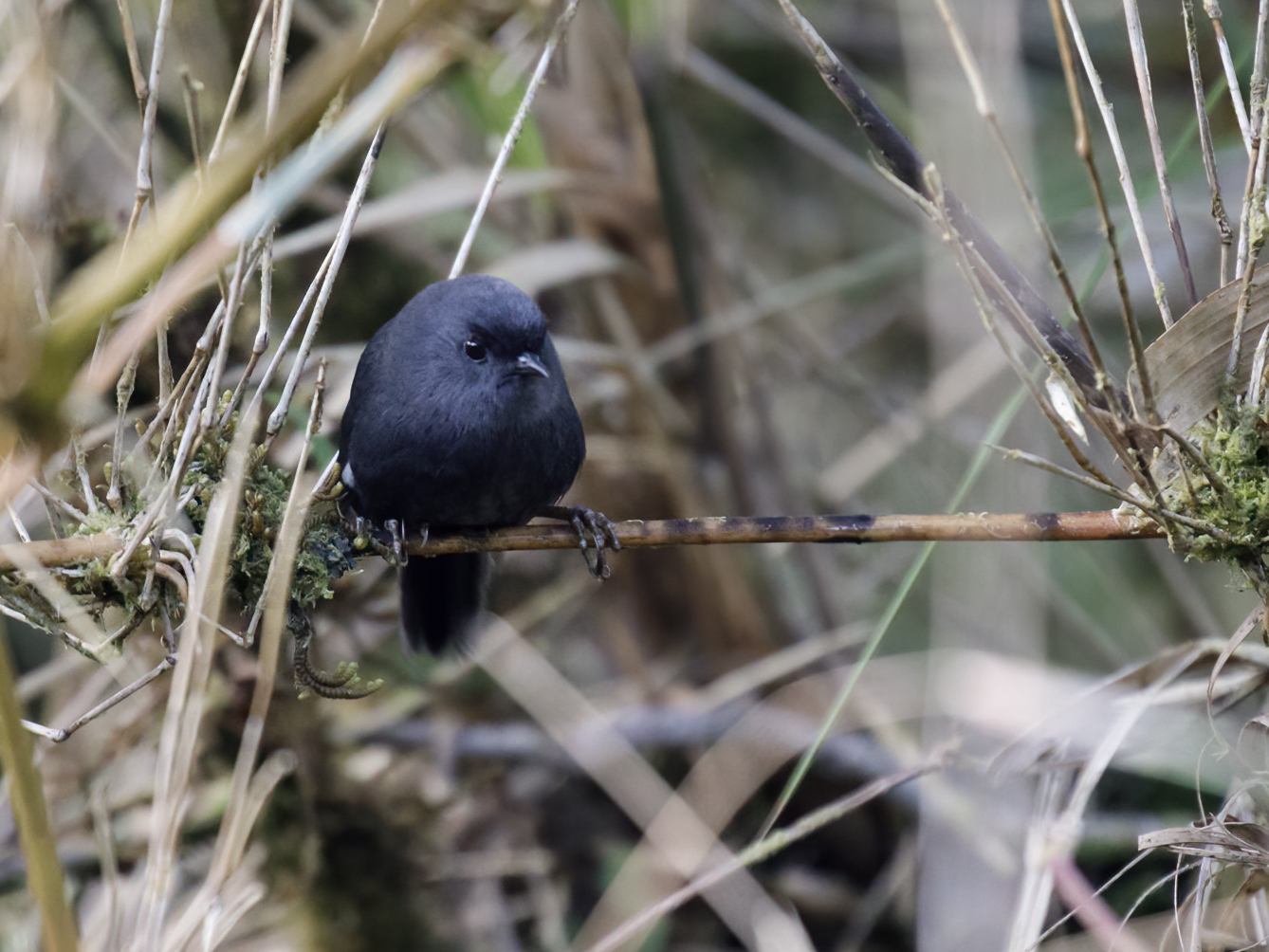

Scientific classification
- Domain: Eukaryota
- Kingdom: Animalia
- Phylum: Chordata
- Class: Aves
- Order: Passeriformes
- Family: Rhinocryptidae
- Genus: Scytalopus
- Species: S. androstictus

Binomial name
- Scytalopus androstictus Krabbe & Cadena, 2010

= Loja tapaculo =

Species of bird

The Loja tapaculo (Scytalopus androstictus) is a species of bird in the family Rhinocryptidae that the South American Classification Committee of the American Ornithological Society (AOS) accepted as a new species in July 2020. It had been classified as a subspecies of paramo tapaculo (Scytalopus opacus). It is found in Ecuador and Peru.

== Taxonomy and systematics ==
The taxonomy of the Loja tapaculo is complicated. Scytalopus canus (now the paramillo tapaculo) and S. opacus (now the paramo tapaculo) were originally thought to be subspecies of either S. magellanicus (Magellanic tapaculo) or S. unicolor (unicolor tapaculo). Both were eventually reclassified as species, and what is now the Loja tapaculo was considered a subspecies of paramo tapaculo. A detailed study of these several related taxa found significant vocal, genetic, and morphological differences among them. Based on these data, the South American Classification Committee of the AOS elevated S. opacus androstictus to species status in July 2020. The International Ornithological Congress (IOC) followed suit in January 2021 and the Clements taxonomy in August 2021.

== Description ==
The Loja tapaculo is approximately 10.5 cm (4.1 in) long. Males weigh 13.9 to 17.9 g (0.49 to 0.63 oz) and females 13.4 to 16 g (0.47 to 0.56 oz). Males are very dark gray above and medium to dark gray on most of the underside. The flanks and vent area are tawny to dark brown with darker barring. Most males also have white primary coverts that show as a patch when the wing is folded. The female is brown above and pale to medium gray on most of the underside. Like the male it has brownish flanks and vent area. The juveniles are highly variable, but generally have shades of brown and barring above and shades of gray and buff below with or without barring.

== Distribution and habitat ==
The Loja tapaculo has a very limited range on the east slope of the Andes in Zamora-Chinchipe Province of Ecuador and the northern part of Peru's Department of Cajamarca. It generally inhabits shrub and scrublands at and above treeline but can also be found in Polylepis woodland and high elevation humid forest. Its elevation range is typically between 2,600 and 3,300 m (8,500 and 10,800 ft). It is believed to be sedentary.

== Status ==
The IUCN has not assessed the Loja tapaculo.
