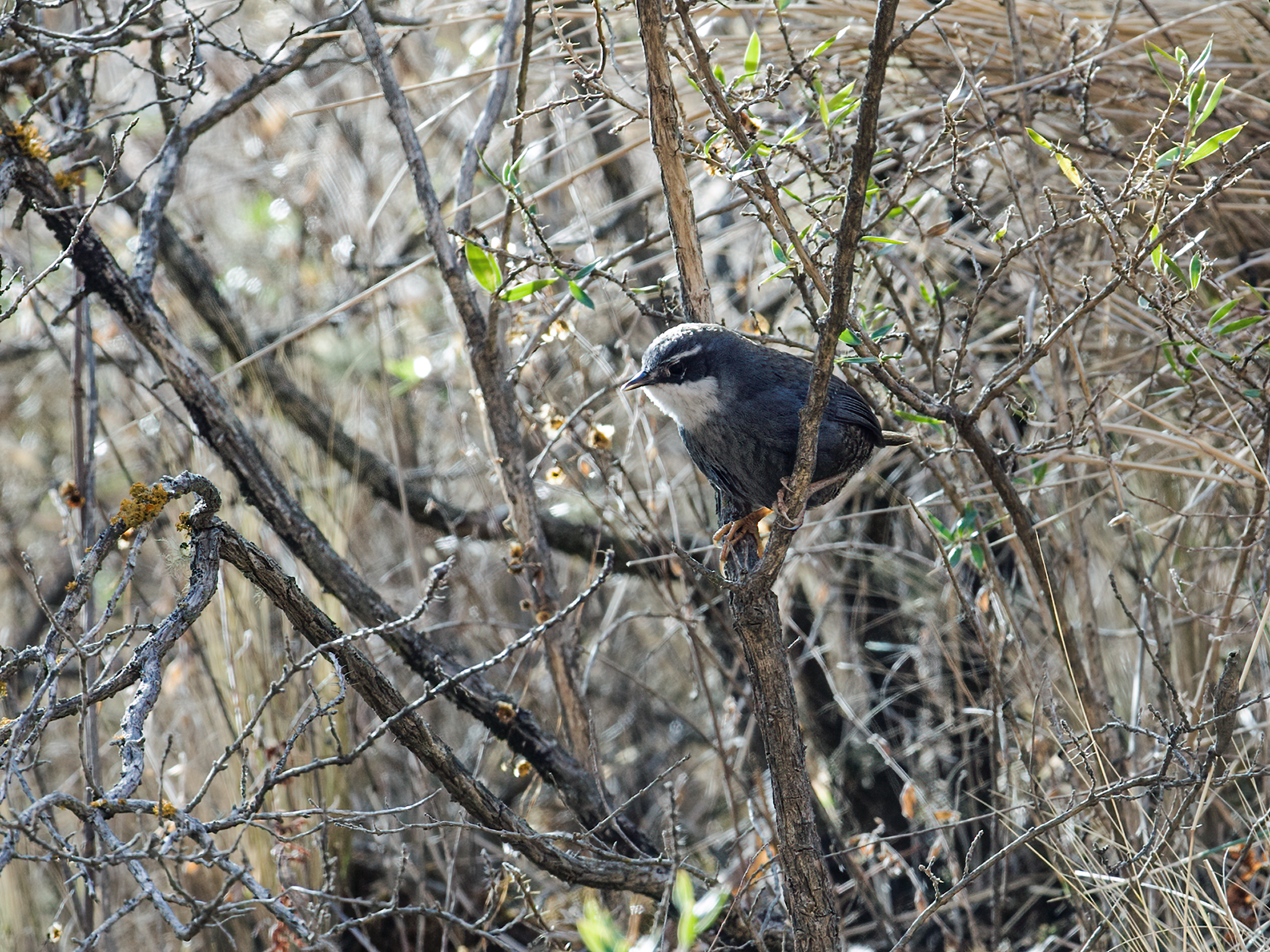

Conservation status
- Least Concern (IUCN 3.1)

Scientific classification
- Domain: Eukaryota
- Kingdom: Animalia
- Phylum: Chordata
- Class: Aves
- Order: Passeriformes
- Family: Rhinocryptidae
- Genus: Scytalopus
- Species: S. zimmeri

Binomial name
- Scytalopus zimmeri Bond & Meyer de Schauensee, 1940

= Zimmer's tapaculo =

Species of bird

Zimmer's tapaculo (Scytalopus zimmeri) is a species of passerine bird in the family Rhinocryptidae. It is found in Bolivia and Argentina.

== Taxonomy and systematics ==
Zimmer's tapaculo has at times been considered a subspecies of Magellanic tapaculo (Scytalopus magellanicus). It and white-browed tapaculo (S. superciliaris) form a superspecies. Its name commemorates American ornithologist John Todd Zimmer.

== Description ==
Zimmer's tapaculo is 10.5 cm (4.1 in) long. Males weigh 17.6 to 19.9 g (0.62 to 0.70 oz) and one female weighed 15.9 g (0.56 oz). The adult's most striking feature is its white supercilium, throat, and upper breast. The rest of the head, the back, and the wings are gray with a brown wash on the back. The lower breast and belly are also gray. Its flanks and vent are olive-brown and have dusky bars. The juvenile's supercilium is faint buff, its upper parts olive-brown with dusky bars, its breast and upper belly gray, and the flanks and lower belly are buff with dusky bars.

== Distribution and habitat ==
Zimmer's tapaculo is found in southern Bolivia's Chuquisaca and Tarija departments and Argentina's Jujuy and Salta provinces. It ranges the Andean slopes from 1,700 to 3,200 m (5,600 to 10,500 ft) elevation. It inhabits several vegetative communities including seasonally humid Alnus, Podocarpus, and Polylepis woodlands where it frequents ravines and other shady areas, and also open wet rocky slopes with bunch grass and shrubs.

== Behavior ==
=== Feeding ===
Zimmer's tapaculo forages on and near the ground, often staying hidden among roots, rocks, and ferns. Its diet is not well known but it appears to favor seeds.

=== Breeding ===
Both members of a Zimmer's tapaculo pair were observed tending nestlings in October. The nest was found in a crevice of an earth and stone bank.

=== Vocalization ===
The song of Zimmer's tapaculo is a series three to five burry notes repeated at intervals, often for many minutes . Its call is described as one or two "quick" notes repeated at intervals .

== Status ==
The IUCN has assessed Zimmer's tapaculo as being of Least Concern. Though its range is small and its population number is not known, "Owing to steepness of the terrain and the species’ tolerance of habitat disturbance, however, it is probably not at any real risk."
