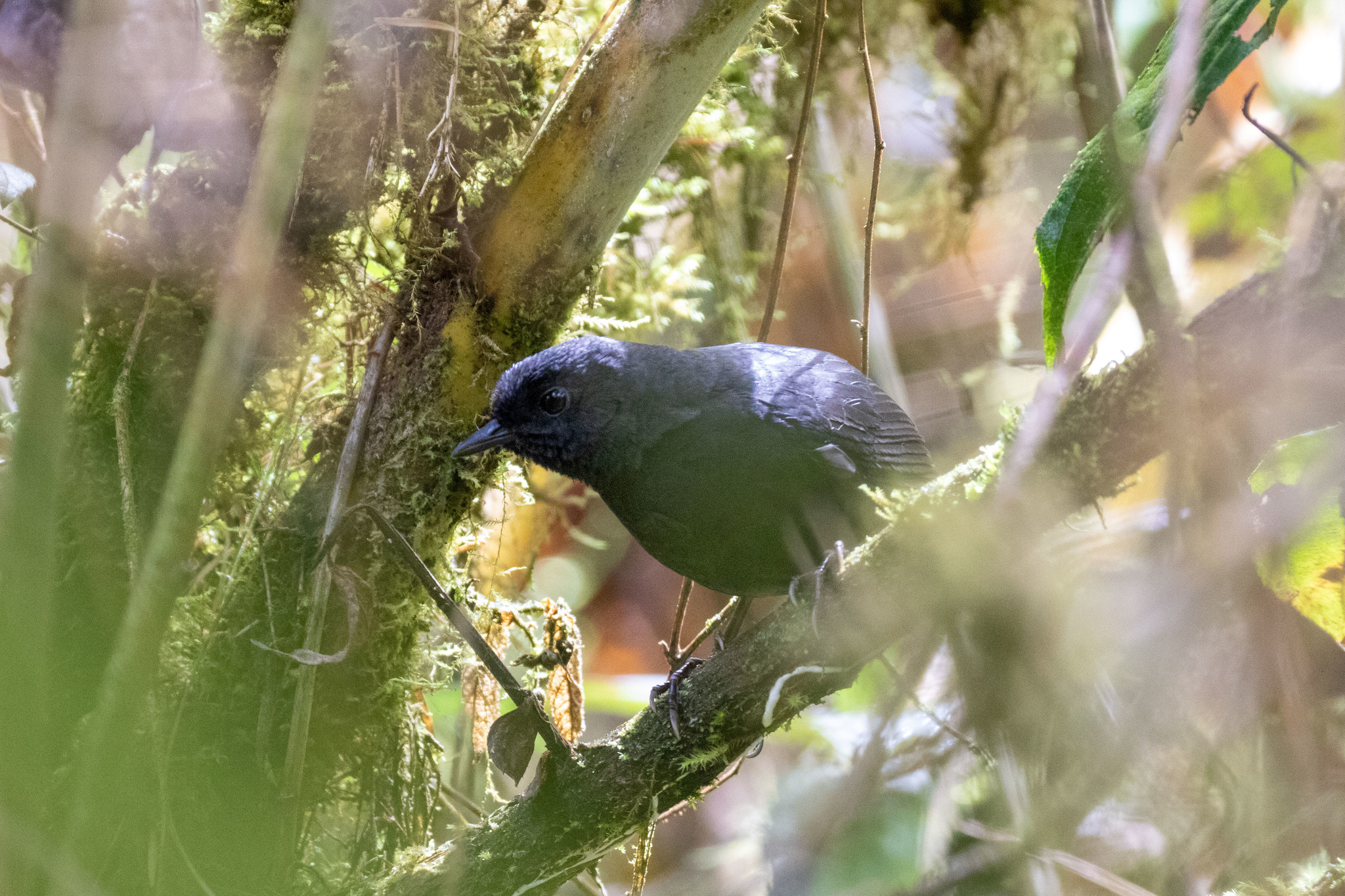

Conservation status
- Least Concern (IUCN 3.1)

Scientific classification
- Kingdom: Animalia
- Phylum: Chordata
- Class: Aves
- Order: Passeriformes
- Family: Rhinocryptidae
- Genus: Scytalopus
- Species: S. macropus

Binomial name
- Scytalopus macropus Berlepsch & Stolzmann, 1896

= Large-footed tapaculo =

Species of bird

The large-footed tapaculo (Scytalopus macropus) is a species of bird in the family Rhinocryptidae. It is endemic to Peru.

== Taxonomy and systematics ==
Unlike many other tapaculos, the large-footed tapaculo has been treated as a species since it was described. It is monotypic.

== Description ==
The large-footed tapaculo is 14 cm (5.5 in) long. Males weigh 36 to 43 g (1.3 to 1.5 oz) and two females weighed 32 and 32.5 g (1.13 and 1.15 oz). It is the largest species of genus Scytalopus. The adult is uniformly very dark gray. The juvenile is paler than the adult, but still dark gray. The feathers of the juvenile's upperparts are tipped with dark brown and those of the underparts with buff or off-white.

== Distribution and habitat ==
The large-footed tapaculo is found only in the central Andes of Peru, from southern Amazonas Department south to Junín Department. It primarily inhabits mossy undergrowth along streams in elfin forest and cloud forest. It ranges in elevation from 2,400 to 3,500 m (7,900 to 11,500 ft).

== Behavior ==
No information has been published about the large-footed tapaculo's diet or its foraging and breeding behaviors.

The large-footed tapaculo's song is "a monotonous series of...notes...usually terminating with a different (normally higher) note." .

== Status ==
The IUCN has assessed the large-footed tapaculo as being of Least Concern. However, it has a restricted range, is very poorly known, and occurs in only one protected area.
