= Ampay tapaculo =

Scientific classification
- Kingdom: Animalia
- Phylum: Chordata
- Class: Aves
- Order: Passeriformes
- Family: Rhinocryptidae
- Genus: Scytalopus
- Species: S. whitneyi

Binomial name
- Scytalopus whitneyi Krabbe, Fjeldså, Hosner, Robbins & Andersen, 2020

Species of bird

The Ampay tapaculo (Scytalopus whitneyi) is a species of bird in the family Rhinocryptidae. It is endemic to Peru.

== Taxonomy and systematics ==
The Ampay tapaculo is one of several new tapaculo species first described or split from existing species in 2020. The South American Classification Committee of the American Ornithological Society accepted it as a new species in July 2020, the International Ornithological Committee (IOC) followed suit in January 2021, and the Clements taxonomy in August 2021. It is monotypic.

The species' English name derives from the Bosque Ampay, where early specimens and sound recordings were made. Its specific epithet honors Bret M. Whitney "for his outstanding contributions to Neotropical ornithology", especially those relating to genus Scytalopus.

== Description ==
Like all members of genus Scytalopus, the Ampay tapaculo is a small, plump, dull-colored bird. It is about 10 to 11 cm (3.9 to 4.3 in) long. Five males weighed about 16 g (0.56 oz) and one female weighed 14.2 g (0.50 oz). The male is generally dusky gray, with a darker face and a lighter crown that presents as a pale eyebrow, and a lighter throat. It has brown to tawny tips on the wing feathers and faint dark yellowish brown bands on the tail. The flanks have ochre-tawny and dusky bars. The single female specimen shows dark reddish brown upperparts with blackish bars on the lower back and rump. It has a prominent pale supercilium and its throat and breast are a lighter gray than the male's. The lower underparts are buffy brown and the bands on the tail are more prominent than those of the male.

== Distribution and habitat ==
The Ampay tapaculo is endemic to east-central Peru. It is known from several sites in each of two general locations about 100 km (62 mi) apart. One area is in eastern Ayacucho south of the Mantaro River and the other is southeast of it in the Department of Apurímac between the Apurímac and Pampas Rivers. In Ayacucho it mainly inhabits shrubby and bunchgrass landscapes on steep rocky slopes at elevations between 3,500 and 4,200 m (11,500 and 13,800 ft). The trilling tapaculo (S. parvirostris) apparently excludes it from forested areas there. In Apurímac it mostly inhabits montane forest and shrublands, especially Podocarpus and Polylepis forest, at elevations between 3,150 and 4,500 m (10,000 and 15,000 ft).

== Behavior ==
=== Feeding ===
The Ampay tapaculo forages on the ground by moving among moss, rocks, and clumps of grass and by hopping along branches near the ground. Details of its diet are lacking but it appears to be small arthropods.

=== Breeding ===
Very little is known about the Ampay tapaculo's breeding phenology. One nest with two large nestlings was found in late December, and a juvenile was also seen at about that time elsewhere. The nest was deep in a crevice in a boulder field among shrubs and forbs.

=== Vocalization ===
The Ampay tapaculo's primary song is "a single repeated note, chip, given at a rate of 1.5–2.2...per second for up to 90 seconds or more". The secondary song is "composed of regularly repeated churrs...lasting for up to 60 seconds". The songs differ slightly between the two populations.

== Status ==
The IUCN has not assessed the Ampay tapaculo. It has a very restricted known range though suitable habitat nearby has not been explored for it. It is common within the protected Bosque Ampay and locally common though unprotected elsewhere in Apurímac. It is uncommon and local in Ayacucho. The authors of the 2020 paper suggest that it would qualify as Near Threatened.

== See also ==
- List of bird species described in the 2020s
