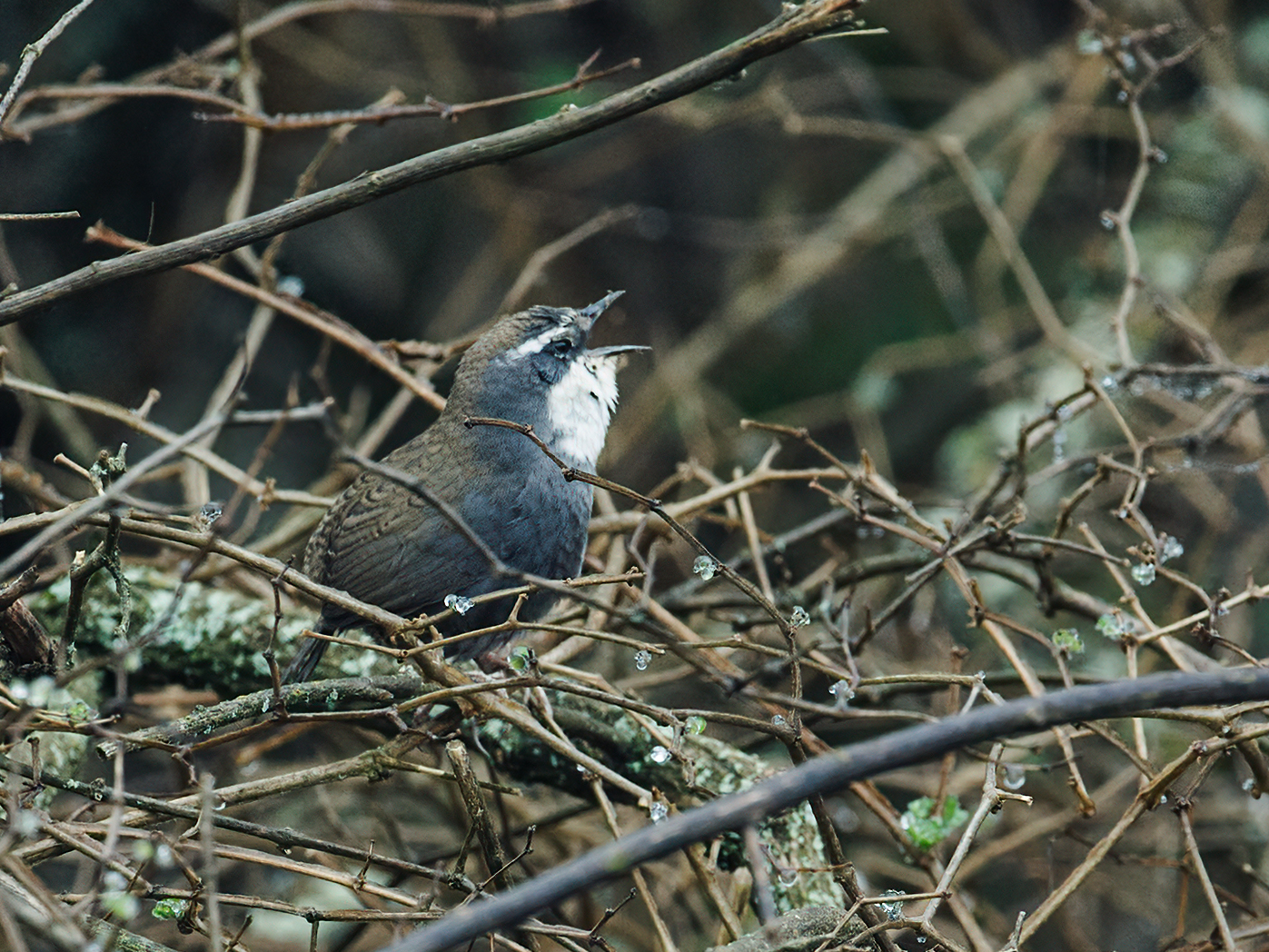

Conservation status
- Least Concern (IUCN 3.1)

Scientific classification
- Kingdom: Animalia
- Phylum: Chordata
- Class: Aves
- Order: Passeriformes
- Family: Rhinocryptidae
- Genus: Scytalopus
- Species: S. superciliaris

Binomial name
- Scytalopus superciliaris Cabanis, 1883

= White-browed tapaculo =

Species of bird

The white-browed tapaculo (Scytalopus superciliaris) is a species of bird in the family Rhinocryptidae. It is found in northwestern Argentina.

== Taxonomy and systematics ==
The white-browed tapaculo has at times been considered a subspecies of Magellanic tapaculo (Scytalopus magellanicus). It and Zimmer's tapaculo (S. zimmeri) form a superspecies. It has two subspecies, the nominate Scytalopus superciliaris superciliaris and S. s. santabarbarae.

== Description ==
The white-browed tapaculo is 10.5 cm (4.1 in) long. The nominate adult's most striking features are its long white supercilium, throat, and upper breast. The back and wings are grayish brown to brownish gray. The lower breast is gray. The rump is brown with fine bars. The flanks, belly, and crissum (the area around the cloaca) are pale olive-brown with black bars. Subspecies S. s. santabarbarae is darker, with upper parts trending to chestnut and the underparts being blackish-brown instead of gray.

== Distribution and habitat ==
The white-browed tapaculo is found only in northwestern Argentina. The nominate subspecies ranges from Jujuy Province south to northern La Rioja Province. Subspecies S. s. santabarbarae is probably limited to the Santa Bárbara Mountains of Jujuy, though it might also extend into Salta Province.

The white-browed tapaculo inhabits the undergrowth of Alnus and Polylepis woodlands, often in shaded rocky ravines. In elevation it ranges from 1,500 to 3,350 m (4,920 to 10,990 ft).

== Behavior ==
=== Feeding ===
No information has been published about the white-browed tapaculo's diet or foraging behavior.

=== Breeding ===
The white-browed tapaculo lays its eggs between October and December, and possibly in September. Two eggs are laid. Three nests have been described; they were open cups placed at the end of tunnels 0.3 to 0.5 m (0.98 to 1.64 ft) long.

=== Vocalization ===
The white-browed tapaculo's song is "a single burred note...followed after short pause by drawn-out descending “churr”..., repeated for several minutes at [a] regular pace" .

== Status ==
The IUCN has assessed the white-browed tapaculo as being of Least Concern. Though it has a limited range it appears to be fairly common. It is found in two, possibly three, national parks.
