= Mérida tapaculo =

Conservation status
- Least Concern (IUCN 3.1)

Scientific classification
- Kingdom: Animalia
- Phylum: Chordata
- Class: Aves
- Order: Passeriformes
- Family: Rhinocryptidae
- Genus: Scytalopus
- Species: S. meridanus

Binomial name
- Scytalopus meridanus Hellmayr, 1922

Species of bird

The Mérida tapaculo (Scytalopus meridanus) is a species of bird in the family Rhinocryptidae. It is endemic to Venezuela.

== Taxonomy and systematics ==
The Mérida tapaculo was previously considered a subspecies of brown-rumped tapaculo (Scytalopus latebricola) but was elevated to species rank based on differences in their vocalizations. Two subspecies are currently (2021) recognized, the nominate S. meridanus meridanus and the "Lara" S. m. fuscicauda. The latter was at one time classed as a subspecies of Magellanic tapaculo (S. magellanicus) and has also been considered a separate species, "Lara tapaculo". It might even be conspecific with S. a. meridanus and not a subspecies.

== Description ==
The Mérida tapaculo is 10.5 to 11.5 cm (4.1 to 4.5 in) long and weighs 13.5 to 16.5 g (0.48 to 0.58 oz). The male's upper body is dark gray washed with brown; the rump and wings are brown. The throat, breast, and belly are paler gray and the flanks and crissum (the area around the cloaca) tawny with faint darker bars. The female is generally paler but the brown wash of the upper body is darker and the tawny flanks brighter. The juvenile is overall brown, darker above and lighter below, with barred underparts. The adult "Lara" subspecies has minor plumage differences from the nominate but they are thought to be age related.

== Distribution and habitat ==
The Mérida tapaculo is found only in the Andes of Venezuela. The nominate subspecies is more southerly, in Mérida and Táchira States, while the "Lara" subspecies is north of it in Lara and Trujillo States. It inhabits the undergrowth and edges of humid montane forest. It is found in Chusquea bamboo but does not prefer it. The nominate subspecies is found mostly from 2,200 to 4,000 m (7,200 to 13,100 ft) elevation while the "Lara" subspecies is found lower, from 1,600 to 3,200 m (5,200 to 10,500 ft).

== Behavior ==
=== Feeding ===
The Mérida tapaculo's diet and foraging phenology have not been studied.

=== Breeding ===
Little is known about the Mérida tapaculo's breeding phenology. Two nests of the "Lara" subspecies were globes made of moss, rootlets, and leaves. They were in crevices in a rock wall; one had one egg and the other two eggs. At both nests, both adults incubated the eggs until they were predated.

=== Vocalization ===
The Mérida tapaculo's song starts with a few descending notes and becomes a rising trill . It has several calls such as , , and .

== Status ==
The IUCN has assessed the Mérida tapaculo as being of Least Concern. Though its range is rather small and its population number is not known, it appears to be common with a stable population. Both subspecies occur in several protected areas.
