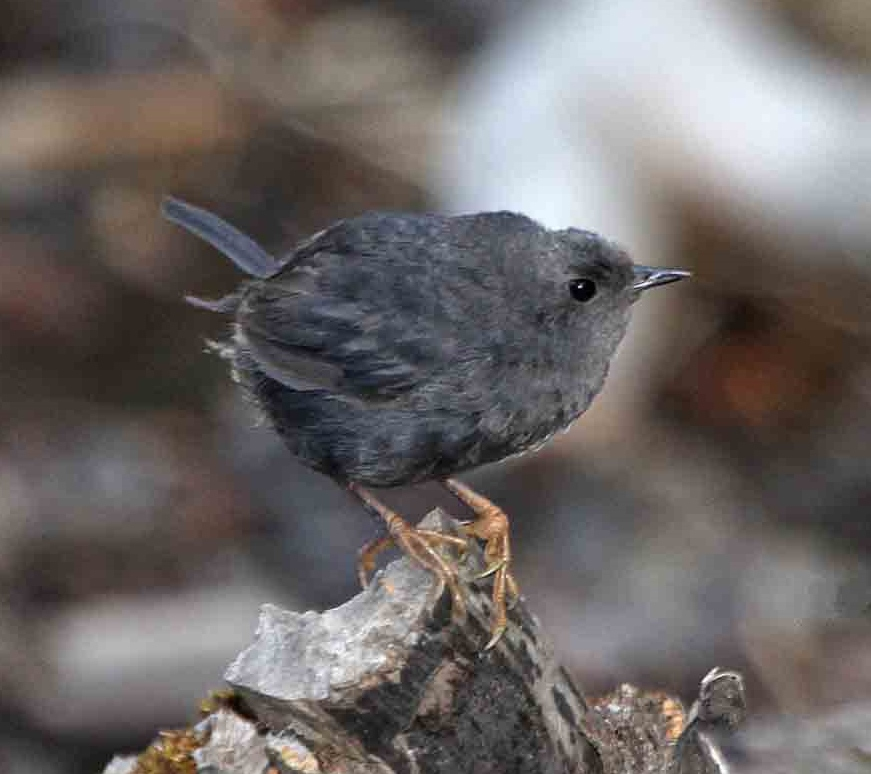
- Magellanic tapaculo (Scytalopus magellanicus)

Scientific classification
- Kingdom: Animalia
- Phylum: Chordata
- Class: Aves
- Order: Passeriformes
- Family: Rhinocryptidae
- Genus: Scytalopus; Gould, 1837

Type species
- Motacilla magellanica Magellanic tapaculo Gmelin, JF, 1789

Species
- 49 species, see list

= Scytalopus =

Genus of birds

Scytalopus is a genus of small suboscine passerine birds belonging to the tapaculo family Rhinocryptidae. They are found in South and Central America from Tierra del Fuego to Costa Rica, but are absent from the Amazon Basin. They inhabit dense vegetation at or near ground-level and are mainly found in mountainous regions, particularly the Andes. They can be very difficult to see as they run through the undergrowth in a mouse-like fashion.

== Taxonomy ==
The genus Scytalopus was introduced in 1837 by the English ornithologist John Gould. The name combines the Ancient Greek skutalē or skutalon meaning "stick" with pous meaning "foot". The type species was specified in 1840 by George Robert Gray as the Magellanic tapaculo.

The species-limits within this genus is among the most complex matters in Neotropical ornithology. They are highly cryptic, and identification using visual features often is impossible. Vocal and biochemical data is typically needed to clarify the taxonomic status of the various populations. Several new species have been described in recent years (e.g. S. stilesi and S. rodriguezi from Colombia). The taxonomic status of many of the Andean species was resolved by Krabbe & Schulenberg (1997) who split a number of species and described three new ones. The confusing situation is perhaps best illustrated by the fact that only 10 species were recognized in this genus in 1970 (Krabbe & Schulenberg, 2003), while the figure now is more than four times as high. Additionally, still undescribed species are known to exist, while some species as currently defined actually may include several species (e.g. the southern population of the large-footed tapaculo may represent an undescribed species). Donegan & Avendano recently reviewed the Colombian and Venezuelan species, formally describing one new subspecies and providing details of a further three undescribed species or subspecies to be described in future publications.

The Brazilian taxa are similarly complex with several recently described species and considerable confusion surrounding the use of the scientific name Scytalopus speluncae.

== Description ==
They are plump with short tails that often are held cocked. Depending on species, the total length is 10–14 cm (4-5½ in). Their plumage is blackish or grey. Several species have brown bellies, rumps or flanks; often with some barring. A few have white crowns or eyebrows. Juveniles of most species are browner and have barred flanks. Many species are essentially impossible to separate by their plumage, but songs and calls are often distinctive and important for species identification.

== Behavior ==
Their diet consists mainly of insects. Little is known about the breeding habits of most species but the eggs are usually white and the nest is usually ball-shaped and made of plant material such as root-fibres and mosses. It is built in a cavity in sites such as earth banks or among the roots or bark of trees.

== Conservation ==
Some species have highly localized distributions, and being poor fliers, they easily become isolated in small populations. BirdLife International currently (2007) consider one species vulnerable (Scytalopus panamensis) and three species endangered (S. iraiensis, S. rodriguezi and S. robbinsi).

== Species list ==
The genus contains 49 species. The white-breasted and Bahia tapaculos were formerly placed in this genus, but these two species are now known to be closer to the bristlefronts (genus Merulaxis) and have therefore been moved to Eleoscytalopus.

Image	Common name	Scientific name	Distribution
	Marsh tapaculo or wetland tapaculo	Scytalopus iraiensis	Brazil.
	Diamantina tapaculo	Scytalopus diamantinensis	Brazil (Bahia)
	Brasília tapaculo	Scytalopus novacapitalis	Brazil (Goiás, the Distrito Federal, and western Minas Gerais.)
	Rock tapaculo	Scytalopus petrophilus	Brazil (Rio de Janeiro and São Paulo)
	Planalto tapaculo	Scytalopus pachecoi	southeastern Brazil and extreme northeastern Argentina.
	Blackish tapaculo	Scytalopus latrans	Colombia, Ecuador, Peru, and Venezuela.
	Mouse-coloured tapaculo	Scytalopus speluncae	Brazil (Espírito Santo to northeastern Rio Grande do Sul.)
	Dusky tapaculo	Scytalopus fuscus	Chile.
	Magellanic tapaculo	Scytalopus magellanicus	Chile (Tierra del Fuego as far as Valparaíso Region), Argentina ( San Juan Province)
	Ancash tapaculo	Scytalopus affinis	Peru.
	White-winged tapaculo	Scytalopus krabbei	Peru
	Loja tapaculo	Scytalopus androstictus	Ecuador (Zamora-Chinchipe Province), Peru( Department of Cajamarca)
	Paramo tapaculo	Scytalopus opacus	southern Colombia to south-central Ecuador
	Paramillo tapaculo	Scytalopus canus	Colombia.
	White-browed tapaculo	Scytalopus superciliaris	northwestern Argentina
	Zimmer's tapaculo	Scytalopus zimmeri	Bolivia and Argentina
	Puna tapaculo	Scytalopus simonsi	Bolivia and Peru
	Diademed tapaculo	Scytalopus schulenbergi	Bolivia and Peru.
	Vilcabamba tapaculo	Scytalopus urubambae	Peru
	Ampay tapaculo	Scytalopus whitneyi	Peru.
	Jalca tapaculo	Scytalopus frankeae	Peru.
	Neblina tapaculo	Scytalopus altirostris	northern Peru
	Trilling tapaculo	Scytalopus parvirostris	Bolivia and Peru.
	Bolivian tapaculo	Scytalopus bolivianus	Bolivia and Peru.
	White-crowned tapaculo	Scytalopus atratus	Bolivia, Colombia, Ecuador, Peru, and Venezuela.
	Santa Marta tapaculo	Scytalopus sanctaemartae	Colombia (Sierra Nevada de Santa Marta)
	Long-tailed tapaculo	Scytalopus micropterus	Colombia, Ecuador and far northern Peru
	Rufous-vented tapaculo	Scytalopus femoralis	Peru
	Utcubamba tapaculo	Scytalopus intermedius	Peru.
	Large-footed tapaculo	Scytalopus macropus	Peru.
	Junin tapaculo	Scytalopus gettyae	Peru.
	Unicolored tapaculo	Scytalopus unicolor	Peru.
	Tschudi's tapaculo	Scytalopus acutirostris	Peru.
	Boa Nova tapaculo	Scytalopus gonzagai	Brazil(Bahia)
	Silvery-fronted tapaculo	Scytalopus argentifrons	Costa Rica and Panama.
	Nariño tapaculo	Scytalopus vicinior	Colombia and Ecuador.
	Tacarcuna tapaculo or pale-throated tapaculo	Scytalopus panamensis	Panama and Colombia
	Chocó tapaculo	Scytalopus chocoensis	Colombia, Ecuador, and Panama.
	Magdalena tapaculo	Scytalopus rodriguezi	Colombia
	Stiles's tapaculo	Scytalopus stilesi	Colombia
	Tatama tapaculo	Scytalopus alvarezlopezi	Colombia
	El Oro tapaculo or Ecuadorian tapaculo	Scytalopus robbinsi	south-western Ecuador
	Caracas tapaculo	Scytalopus caracae	Venezuela.
	Pale-bellied tapaculo	Scytalopus griseicollis	Colombia and Venezuela
	Brown-rumped tapaculo	Scytalopus latebricola	Colombia
	Perijá tapaculo	Scytalopus perijanus	Colombia, Venezuela
	Mérida tapaculo	Scytalopus meridanus	Venezuela.
	Chusquea tapaculo	Scytalopus parkeri	southern Ecuador and far northern Peru.
	Spillmann's tapaculo	Scytalopus spillmanni	Colombia and Ecuador.
