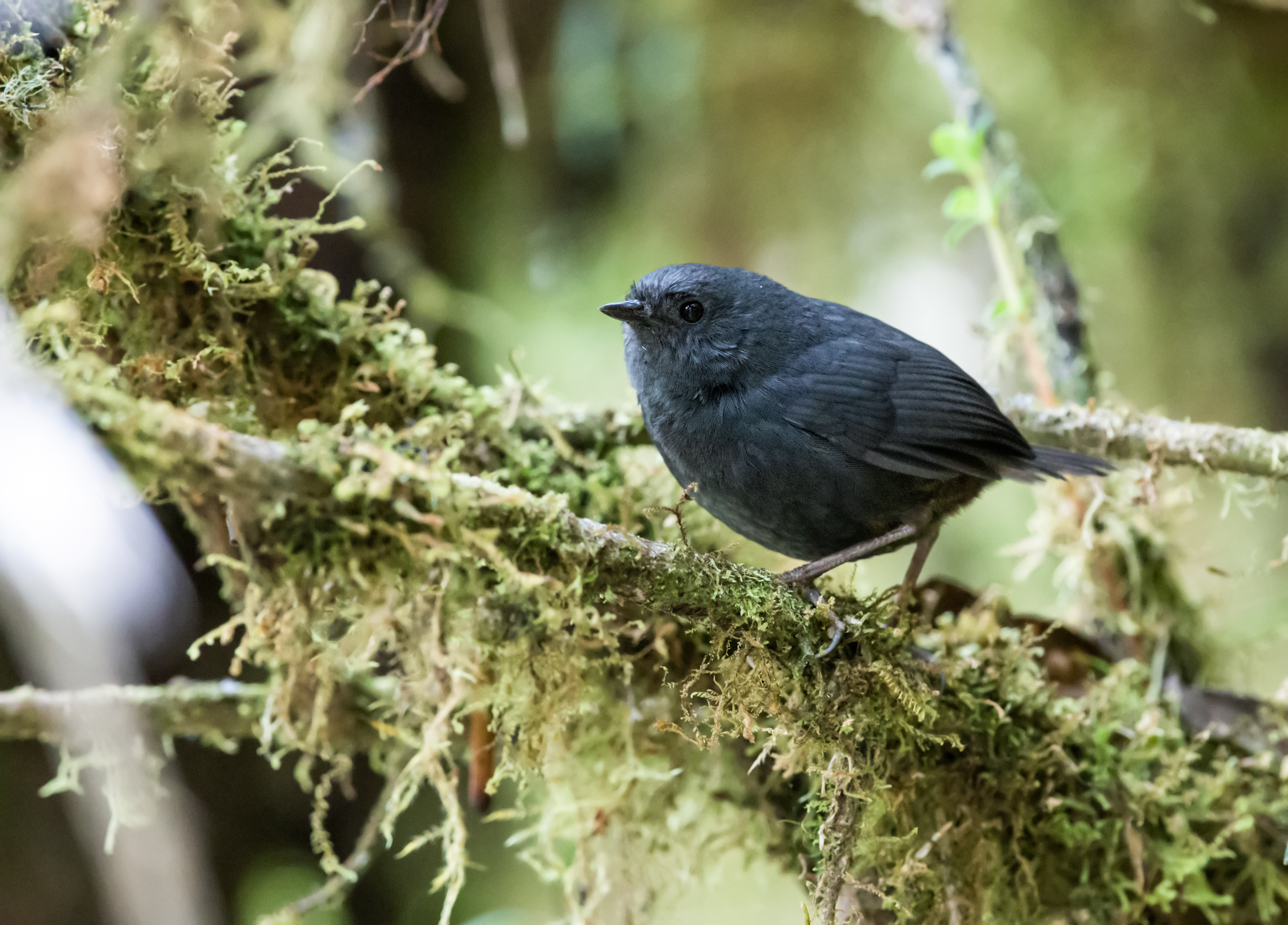

Conservation status
- Least Concern (IUCN 3.1)

Scientific classification
- Kingdom: Animalia
- Phylum: Chordata
- Class: Aves
- Order: Passeriformes
- Family: Rhinocryptidae
- Genus: Scytalopus
- Species: S. acutirostris

Binomial name
- Scytalopus acutirostris (Tschudi, 1844)

= Tschudi's tapaculo =

Species of bird

Tschudi's tapaculo (Scytalopus acutirostris) is a species of bird in the family Rhinocryptidae. It is endemic to Peru.

== Taxonomy and systematics ==
Tschudi's tapaculo was previously considered a subspecies of Magellanic tapaculo (Scytalopus magellanicus) but was elevated to species status based on differences in their vocalizations.

== Description ==
Tschudi's tapaculo is 10.5 cm (4.1 in) long. Males weigh 17 to 20 g (0.60 to 0.71 oz) and females 16.5 to 19 g (0.58 to 0.67 oz). The adult male is dark gray above and lighter gray below; the flanks have a very light brownish wash. The female is paler overall, its rump has a brown wash, and its flanks and crissum (the area around the cloaca) are tawny with black bars. The juvenile has bars and spots.

== Distribution and habitat ==
Tschudi's tapaculo is found only the Andes of Peru, from Amazonas south to Junín in a fairly narrow elevational range of 2,675 to 3,500 m (8,776 to 11,483 ft). There it inhabits the undergrowth of humid cloud forest. Unlike several other tapaculos, it is rarely found in bamboo.

== Behavior ==
=== Feeding ===
The diet of Tschudi's tapaculo appears to be mostly insects but also includes seeds. No information is available about its foraging technique.

=== Breeding ===
No information is available other than that a juvenile was collected in August.

=== Vocalization ===
The song of Tschudi's tapaculo is somewhat variable but is often short notes or a series of notes such as and . The call is repeated single notes .

== Status ==
The IUCN has assessed Tschudi's tapaculo as being of Least Concern. Though it has a small range and its population has not been quantified, they are both believed large enough to support that rating.
