= Magdalena tapaculo =

Conservation status
- Endangered (IUCN 3.1)

Scientific classification
- Kingdom: Animalia
- Phylum: Chordata
- Class: Aves
- Order: Passeriformes
- Family: Rhinocryptidae
- Genus: Scytalopus
- Species: S. rodriguezi

Binomial name
- Scytalopus rodriguezi Krabbe, Salaman, Cortés, Quevedo, Ortega & Cadena, 2005

Species of bird

The Magdalena tapaculo (Scytalopus rodriguezi), also known as the Upper Magdalena tapaculo, is a member of the tapaculos, a group of Neotropical birds. It was described as new to science in 2005.

It is a restricted-range endemic presently known only from two localities on the eastern slope of the Cordillera Central at the head of the Magdalena Valley, Colombia at 2000 m or more above sea-level. Its range is believed to be no greater than 170 km^{2}, and its population around 2,200 pairs; due to its recent description, no formal evaluation of its conservation status has taken place yet, however. It is found in humid forests with dense understorey.

The species scientific name honours José Vicente Rodriguez Mahecha, a Colombian conservationist.

The existence of this species was first suspected in 1986, when a tape-recording of the bird's song was made, but political instability in the region prevented a return visit until 2002–2003, when the species' existence was confirmed.
