= Paramillo tapaculo =

Conservation status
- Near Threatened (IUCN 3.1)

Scientific classification
- Kingdom: Animalia
- Phylum: Chordata
- Class: Aves
- Order: Passeriformes
- Family: Rhinocryptidae
- Genus: Scytalopus
- Species: S. canus

Binomial name
- Scytalopus canus Chapman, 1915

Synonyms
- Scytalopus opaca

Species of bird

The Paramillo tapaculo (Scytalopus canus) is a species of bird in the family Rhinocryptidae.

== Taxonomy ==
It has traditionally included the more widespread S. opacus as a subspecies, but under the common name Paramo tapaculo (a name now used exclusively for S. opacus). The two have different voices, leading to them being split into separate species in 2010.

== Distribution and habitat ==
The Paramillo tapaculo is endemic to humid highland scrub in the Cordillera Occidental in Colombia. At present it is only known from Páramo de Paramillo and Páramo de Frontino (also known as Paramo del Sol). It may occur elsewhere in the Cordillera Occidental of Colombia. It is restricted to a narrow swath of treeline vegetation (scrub, stunted trees and Polylepis woodland) situated between montane forest and Páramo grasslands that is often just hundreds of meters wide.

== Description ==
The Paramillo tapaculo resembles other Scytalopus tapaculos, being overall dark grey, but lacking the brown lower flanks of the Paramo tapaculo.

== Status and conservation ==
Given the estimated extent of occurrence and observed decline in the extent and quality of habitat, the Paramillo tapaculo has an IUCN status of near threatened. While locally common, the estimated area of suitable habitat within the known range of the Paramillo tapaculo is 3 km^{2} in total. Only 0.1 km^{2} is effectively protected by the Fundación ProAves Colibri del Sol Bird Reserve (which also harbours the highly threatened dusky starfrontlet and Fenwick's antpitta). Páramo de Paramillo is a national park, but very poorly protected.
