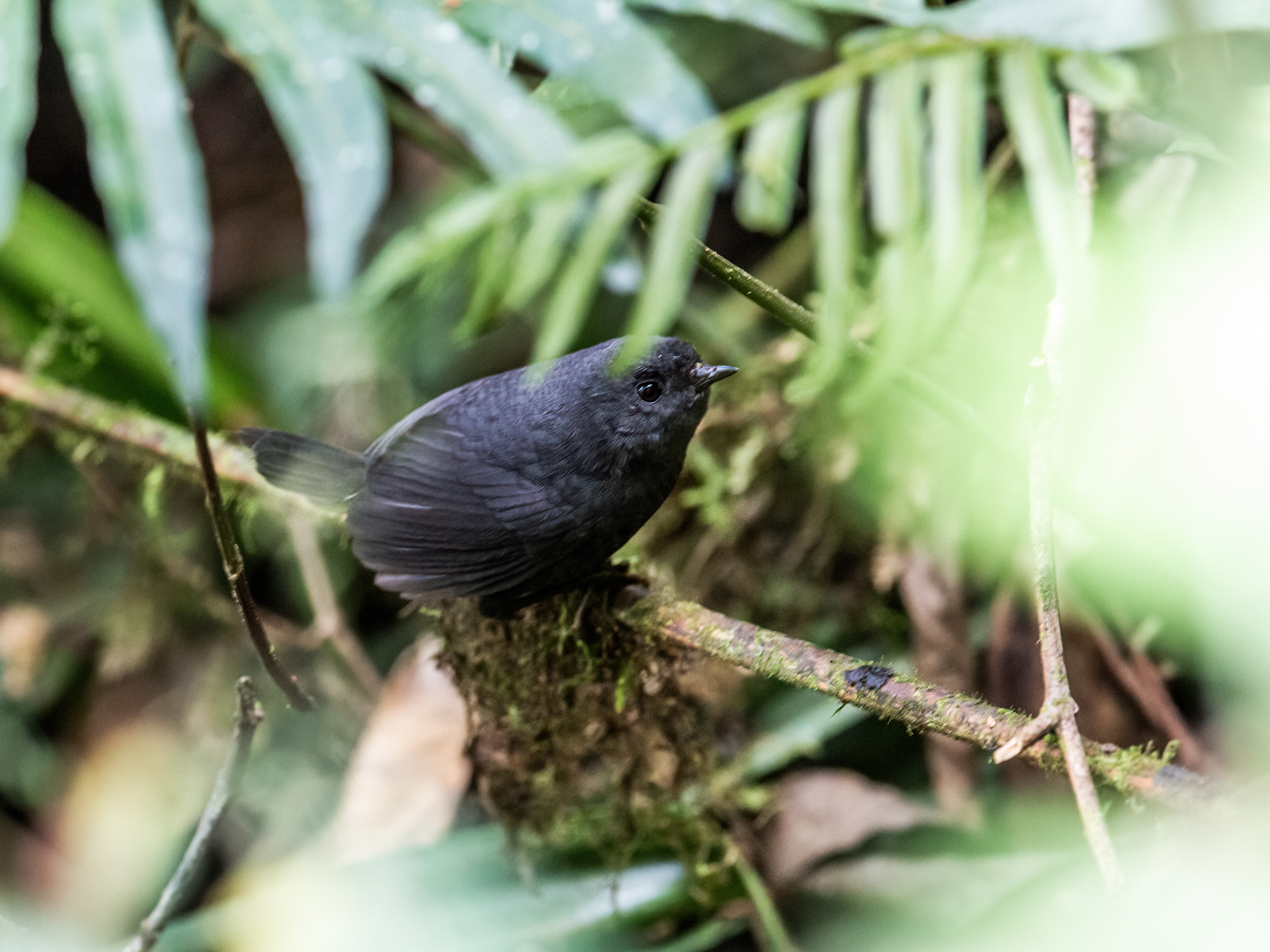

Conservation status
- Least Concern (IUCN 3.1)

Scientific classification
- Kingdom: Animalia
- Phylum: Chordata
- Class: Aves
- Order: Passeriformes
- Family: Rhinocryptidae
- Genus: Scytalopus
- Species: S. parvirostris

Binomial name
- Scytalopus parvirostris Zimmer, 1939

= Trilling tapaculo =

Species of bird

The trilling tapaculo (Scytalopus parvirostris) is a species of bird in the family Rhinocryptidae. It is found in Bolivia and Peru.

== Taxonomy and systematics ==
The trilling tapaculo was previously considered a subspecies of unicolored tapaculo (Scytalopus unicolor) but was elevated to species status based on differences in their vocalizations. Though it is monophyletic, there are song variations in different parts of its range that suggest that there might be undefined subspecies.

== Description ==
The trilling tapaculo is 10.5 cm (4.1 in) long. Males weigh 17.5 to 21 g (0.62 to 0.74 oz) and females 15.4 to 18 g (0.54 to 0.63 oz). Adult males are usually dark gray above and lighter gray below, though sometimes dark gray all over. The flanks and crissum (the area around the cloaca) are dark reddish brown with dusky bars. The female is similar to the male but paler with a dark brown wash. The juvenile is similar to the female with the addition of a scaly appearance due to yellowish edges to feathers.

== Distribution and habitat ==
The trilling tapaculo is found on the east slope of the Andes from southern Amazonas, Peru, southeastward to western Santa Cruz in Bolivia. It inhabits the undergrowth of humid montane forest between the elevations of 1,800 and 2,500 m (5,900 and 8,200 ft) in Peru. In Bolivia it is found from 2,000 to 3,200 m (6,600 to 10,500 ft) and locally to 3,300 m (10,800 ft).

== Behavior ==
=== Feeding ===
The trilling tapaculo forages in dense undergrowth alone or in pairs, on or near the ground. Its diet has not been studied.

=== Breeding ===
Until a 2014 publication nothing was known about the trilling tapaculo's breeding biology other than that a juvenile was collected in July. In 2009 researchers discovered a nest in Peru. It was a globe with an outer layer mostly of small rootlets lined mostly with fern scales. It was constructed in a cavity in a rotten tree and contained two eggs. The authors monitored incubation but did not specify whether one or both adults incubated. The eggs hatched seven days after discovery and the nestlings disappeared soon after; they were too young to have fledged so the authors concluded that the nest had been predated.

=== Vocalization ===
The trilling tapaculo's song gives it its name. The trill's pace varies geographically, at 21 notes per second in central Peru , 14 in southern Peru , and 20 to 28 in Bolivia . Its scold is similar but shorter and it also has a single-note call .

== Status ==
The IUCN has assessed the trilling tapaculo as being of Least Concern. It has a large range, and though its population has not been quantified it is believed to be fairly large and stable.
