= El Oro tapaculo =

Ecuadorian tapaculo

Conservation status
- Endangered (IUCN 3.1)

Scientific classification
- Kingdom: Animalia
- Phylum: Chordata
- Class: Aves
- Order: Passeriformes
- Family: Rhinocryptidae
- Genus: Scytalopus
- Species: S. robbinsi

Binomial name
- Scytalopus robbinsi Krabbe & Schulenberg, 1997

Species of bird

The Ecuadorian tapaculo or El Oro tapaculo (Scytalopus robbinsi) is a small passerine bird belonging to the genus Scytalopus, a genus of tapaculos. It is restricted to a small area in south-western Ecuador and was not described until 1997.

It is a small tapaculo, 11 centimetres long. The bill is black and fairly heavy. The plumage is grey with a brown nape and rump and brown barring on the flanks. The tail is blackish. The female's underparts are browner than those of the male. The song is a series of double-notes repeated for about a minute.

The bird inhabits the undergrowth of humid forest between 700 and 1250 metres above sea-level on the Andean slope in El Oro Province, Guayas Province and Cañar Province and undoubtedly in the intervening Azuay Province. Its population is believed to be small and declining. It is threatened by the loss, degradation and fragmentation of its habitat and is classified as an endangered species by the IUCN. Part of its range lies within the protected Buenaventura Reserve.
