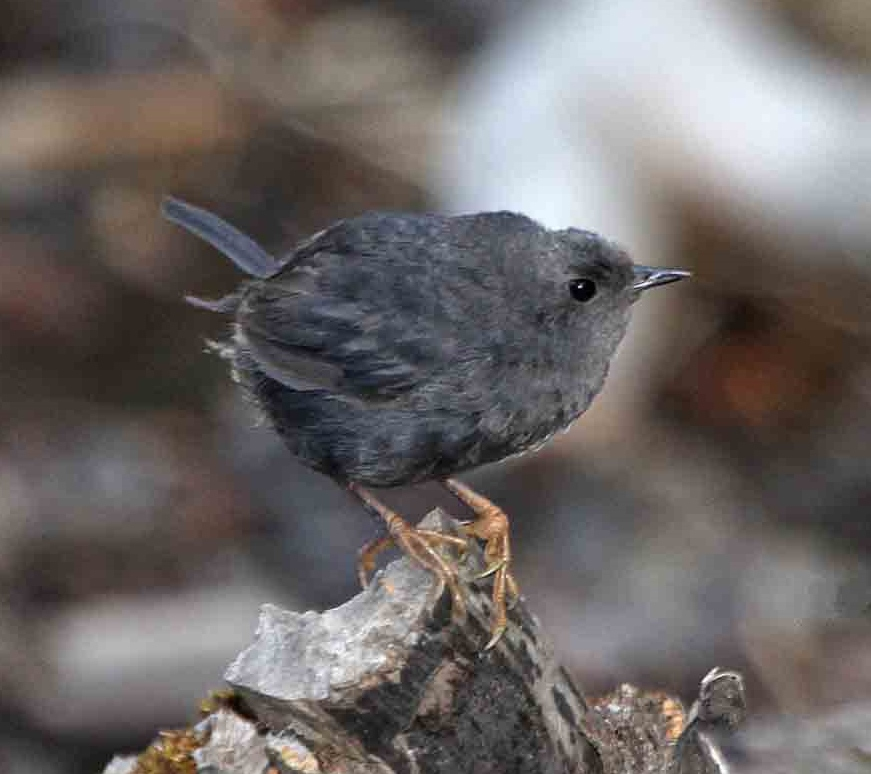
- at Cerro Chapelco, San Martín de los Andes, Neuquén Province, Argentina

Conservation status
- Least Concern (IUCN 3.1)

Scientific classification
- Kingdom: Animalia
- Phylum: Chordata
- Class: Aves
- Order: Passeriformes
- Family: Rhinocryptidae
- Genus: Scytalopus
- Species: S. magellanicus

Binomial name
- Scytalopus magellanicus (Gmelin, JF, 1789)

= Magellanic tapaculo =

Species of bird

The Magellanic tapaculo (Scytalopus magellanicus) is a small passerine bird in the tapaculo family Rhinocryptidae that is found in southern South America.

== Taxonomy ==
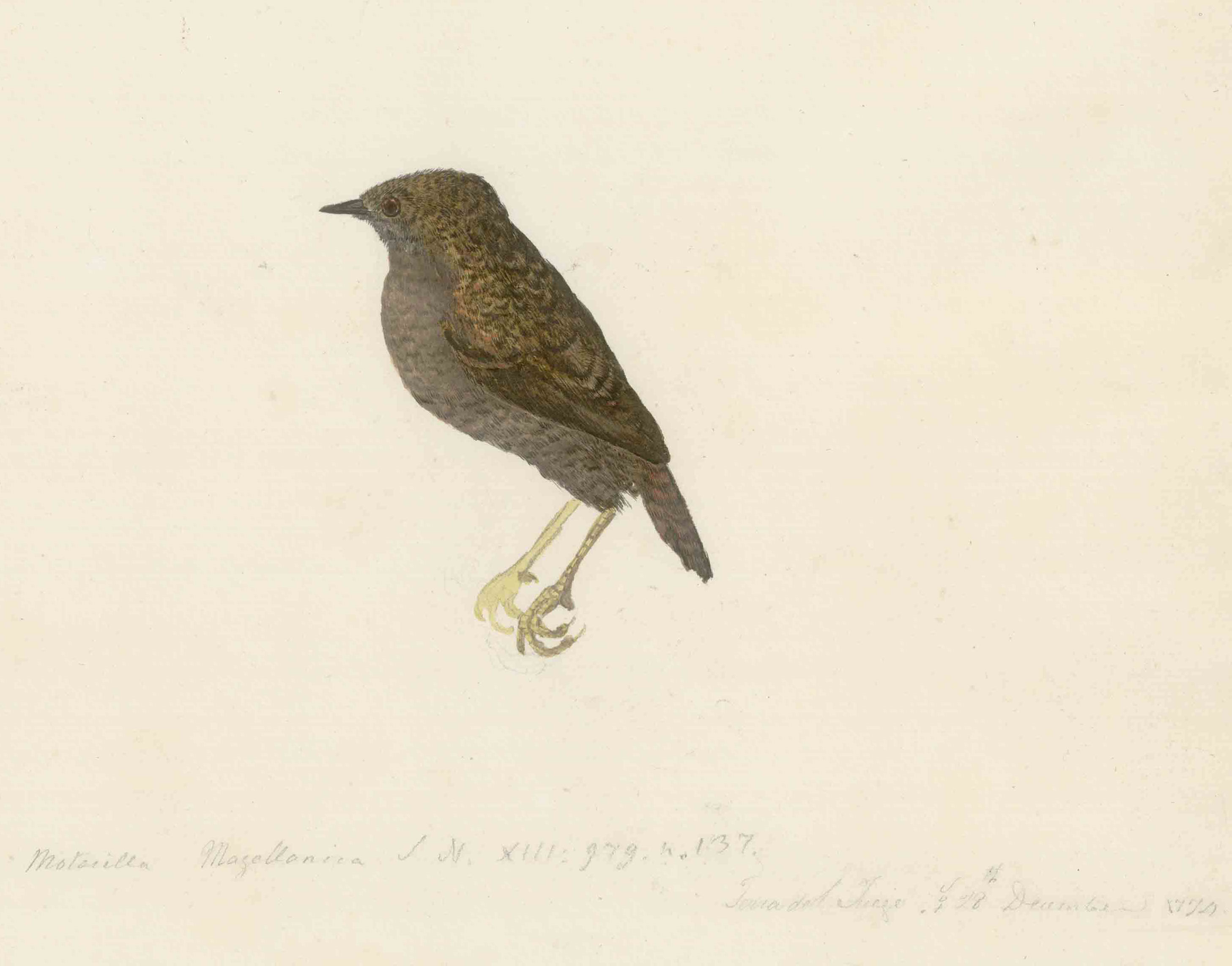
Watercolour made by Georg Forster on the island of Tierra del Fuego on James Cook's second voyage to the Pacific Ocean. This painting is the holotype for the species.

The Magellanic tapaculo was formally described in 1789 by the German naturalist Johann Friedrich Gmelin in his revised and expanded edition of Carl Linnaeus's Systema Naturae. He placed it with the wagtails in the genus Motacilla and coined the binomial name Motacilla magellanica. Gmelin based his description on the "Magellanic warbler" that had been described in 1783 by the English ornithologist John Latham in his A General Synopsis of Birds. The naturalist Joseph Banks had provided Latham with a water-colour drawing of the bird by Georg Forster who had accompanied James Cook on his second voyage to the Pacific Ocean. The picture is dated 28 December 1774 at Tierra del Fuego. This picture is now the holotype for the species and is held by the Natural History Museum in London. The species is monotypic: no subspecies are recognised.

The species was often known as the Andean tapaculo in the past and included a number of subspecies distributed along the Andes. These are now treated as species in their own right, leaving the Magellanic tapaculo with no subspecies although birds in the north of its range are larger and darker and may deserve subspecies status.

== Description ==
It is a wren-like bird, 10 to 12 cm in length. The bill is slender and black while the legs are pinkish and fairly long. The tail is short and held erect. The plumage is dark-grey with a chestnut tinge to the flanks, undertail and wings. Some birds have a silvery-white patch on the crown. Juvenile birds are brown with dark barring and usually lack white on the crown. The song is loud, staccato and repetitive.

== Distribution and habitat ==
Its range extends northwards from Tierra del Fuego as far as Valparaíso Region in Chile and San Juan Province in Argentina. Charles Darwin collected a specimen in the Falkland Islands in 1833 or 1834 but there have been no definite records there since. It inhabits dense vegetation near ground-level in forest and woodland where it forages for insects. It often occurs near water and is commonly associated with stands of Chusquea bamboo.

== Behaviour ==
It is terrestrial and prefers to run rather than fly.

=== Breeding ===
The domed nest is made of moss, lichens and root-fibres. Two or three white eggs are laid.
