= John T. Zimmer =

American ornithologist (1889–1957)

John Todd Zimmer (February 28, 1889 in Bridgeport, Ohio – January 6, 1957 in White Plains, New York) was a leading American ornithologist.

A graduate of University of Nebraska, he became interested in both entomology and ornithology. From 1913 he worked as an agricultural adviser in the Philippines and later New Guinea, during which time he created important collections of bird specimens. After his return to America, he joined the staff of the Field Museum of Natural History. In that role, he compiled a Catalog of the Ayer Ornithological Library, and participated in expeditions to Africa and Peru.

In 1930 Frank Chapman recruited him as Associate Curator of Birds at the American Museum of Natural History in New York, where he remained for the rest of his life. He made systematic revisions of the taxonomy of the birds of Peru and their relatives in other parts of South America, and in his later years combined this with studies of New World flycatchers, preparing the section on the Tyrannidae for Peter's Check-list of Birds of the World.

He was also a Fellow of the American Ornithologists' Union, and editor of its journal The Auk from 1942 to 1948.

Zimmer is commemorated in the names of a number of animals, including Zimmer's tapaculo Scytalopus zimmeri.
