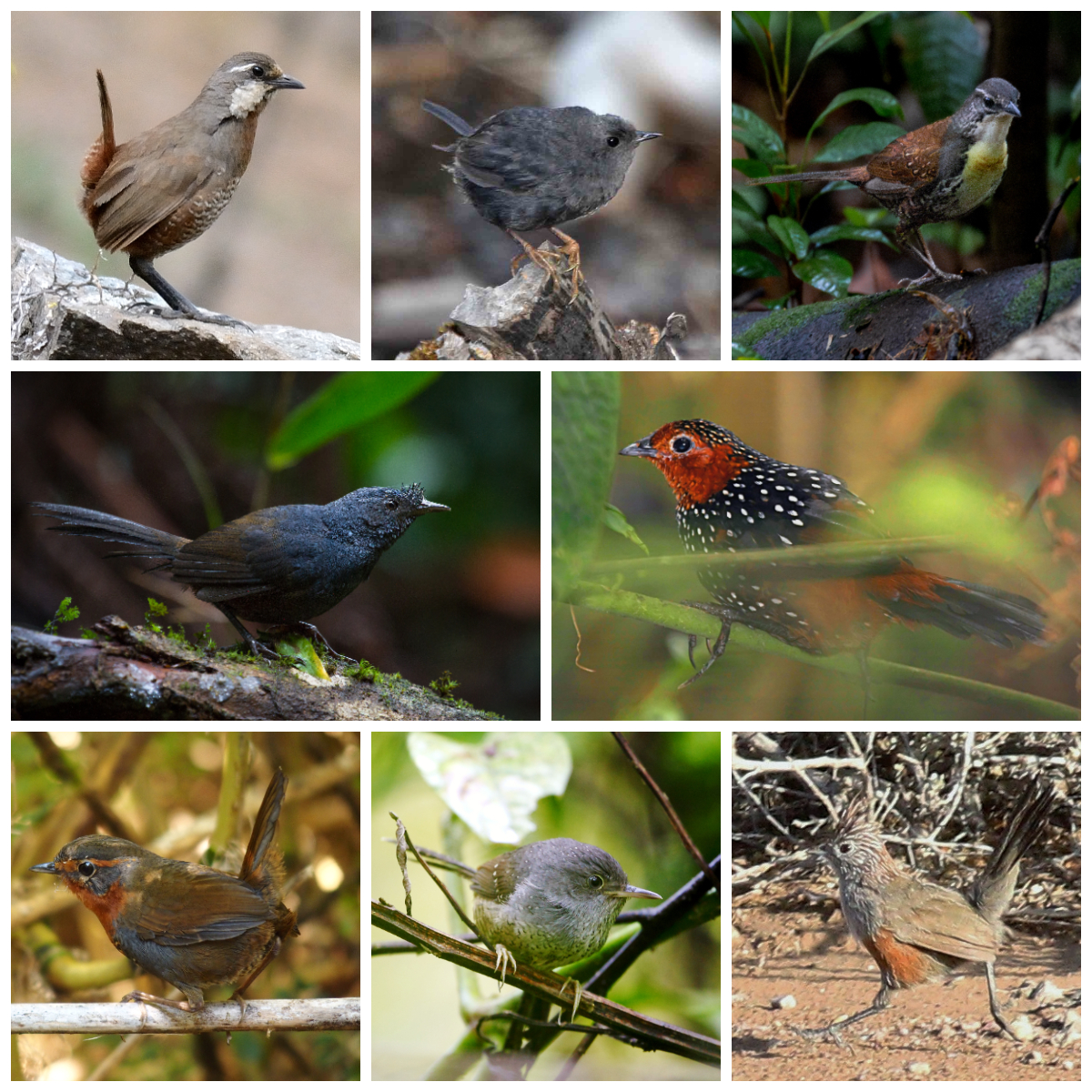
- Diversity of Rhinocryptidae

Scientific classification
- Kingdom: Animalia
- Phylum: Chordata
- Class: Aves
- Order: Passeriformes
- Parvorder: Furnariida
- Family: Rhinocryptidae; Wetmore, 1930

Genera
- Acropternis; Eleoscytalopus; Eugralla; Liosceles; Merulaxis; Myornis; Psilorhamphus; Pteroptochos; Rhinocrypta; Scelorchilus; Scytalopus; Teledromas

Synonyms
- Pteroptochidae

= Tapaculo =

Tapaculos

Family of birds

The tapaculos /ˌtæpəˈkuːloʊz, ˌtɑːpɑː-/ or tapacolos /-ˈkoʊ-/ are a family, Rhinocryptidae, of small suboscine passerine birds, found mainly in South America and with the highest diversity in the Andean regions. Three species (Chocó, Tacarcuna, and the silvery-fronted) are found in southern Central America.

== Description ==
Tapaculos are small to medium-sized birds, with a total length ranging from 10–24 cm (4–9½ in). These are terrestrial species that fly only poorly on their short wings. They have strong legs, well-suited to their habitat of grassland or forest undergrowth. The tail is cocked and pointed towards the head, and the name tapaculo probably derives from Spanish for loincloth. Another possible explanation is that it originates from the Chilean name for the white-throated tapaculo, simply tapaculo, which is an onomatopoeic reference to its commonly heard song.

While the majority of the family are small blackish or brown birds there are some larger and more colourful species. All tapaculos are skulking birds that frequently stay low in dense vegetation, even the larger, colorful species, and this renders them difficult to see. They are best located and – in the case of Scytalopus spp. – identified by their vocalisations.

They feed on insects, seeds and other soft plant material with their pointed bills, and will scratch on the ground like a pheasant.

Most species lay two or three white eggs in a covered location, whether it be a burrow, a hole in a tree, or a domed nest.

== Status and conservation ==
Some species have highly localized distributions and, being poor fliers, they easily become isolated in small populations. BirdLife International currently (2007) consider one species vulnerable (Scytalopus panamensis), three species endangered (S. iraiensis, S. rodriguezi and S. robbinsi), and two species critically endangered (Eleoscytalopus psychopompus and Merulaxis stresemanni). The two critically endangered species are restricted to Atlantic forest of eastern Brazil, and were only recently rediscovered after several years without any records.

== Taxonomy ==
The tapaculos were traditionally placed in a distinct family Rhinocryptidae; more recent research indicates that according to analysis of mt and nDNA sequence data, the tapaculos might be better merged into the Formicariidae as tribe Rhinocryptini, as they are closer to the antthrushes than either is to the true antpittas.

An alternative family name Pteroptochidae, has been used historically.

The phylogenetic tree shown below is based on a large-scale genetic study of the suboscines by Michael Harvey and collaborators that was published in 2020. The species numbers are from the list maintained by the International Ornithologists' Union (IOC).

- Rhinocryptidae
  - - - Pteroptochos – huet-huets and moustached turca (3 species)
      - Scelorchilus – tapaculos (2 species)
    - - - Liosceles – rusty-belted tapaculo
        - Psilorhamphus – spotted bamboowren
      - - Acropternis – ocellated tapaculo
        - - Rhinocrypta – crested gallito
          - Teledromas – sandy gallito
  - - - Eleoscytalopus – tapaculos (2 species)
      - Merulaxis – bristlefronts (2 species)
    - - Myornis – ash-colored tapaculo
      - - Eugralla – ochre-flanked tapaculo
        - Scytalopus – tapaculos (49 species)

The species-limits within the genus Scytalopus have historically been difficult to determine. The birds are highly cryptic, and identification using visual features often is impossible. Vocal and biochemical data is typically needed to clarify the taxonomic status of the various populations. Several new species have been described in recent years (e.g. S. whitneyi and S. frankeae from Peru). The Brazilian taxa are similarly complex with several recently described species and considerable confusion surrounding the use of the scientific name Scytalopus speluncae.

Additionally, still undescribed species are known to exist, while some species as currently defined actually may include several species (e.g. the southern population of the large-footed tapaculo may represent a yet undescribed species). The confusing situation is perhaps best illustrated by the fact that only ten species were recognized in this genus in 1970, while the figure now is more than four times as high.

== Cited sources ==
- Krabbe, N.K.; Schulenberg, T.S. (2003). "Rhinocryptidae (Tapaculos)". In del Hoyo, J.; Elliott, A.; Christie, D.A. (eds.). Handbook of the Birds of the World. Vol. 8: Broadbills to Tapaculos. Barcelona: Lynx Edicions. pp. 748–788. ISBN 978-84-87334-50-4.
