= List of tapaculos =

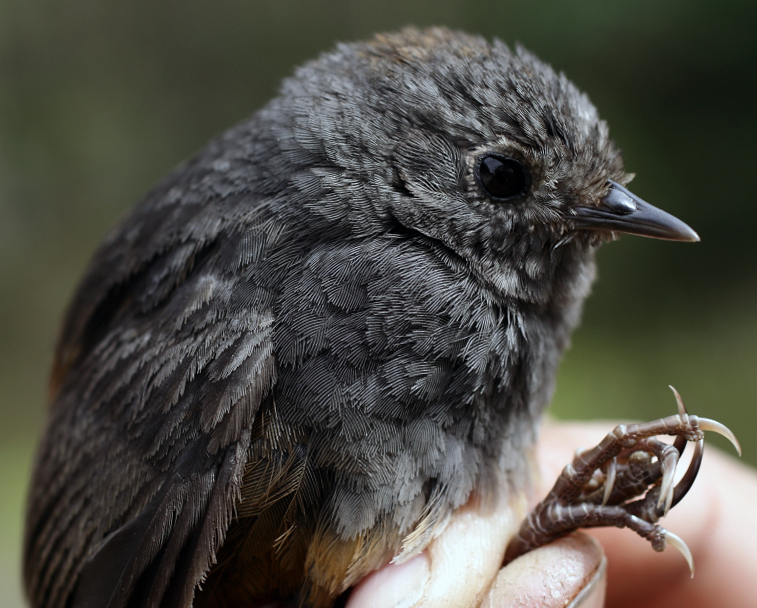
Perijá tapaculo

Rhinocryptidae is a family of passerine birds in the parvorder Furnariida. Most species in the family are called tapaculos, although some are known as huet-huets, gallitos, bristlefronts, turcas, or bamboowrens. Tapaculos are endemic to the Neotropics and inhabit dense undergrowth in a variety of habitats, from lowland tropical rainforest to páramo and puna grassland high in the Andes. Tapaculos are usually extremely secretive, ground-dwelling birds that are best detected by their vocalizations. Several species of tapaculos may even be flightless. Tapaculos are generally blackish or grayish with rufous-and-black markings on the tail and sides, and are best identified by their calls. Several species of tapaculos are threatened with extinction, with habitat loss being the principal threat to most species. Stresemann's bristlefront is considered to be critically endangered by the International Union for Conservation of Nature, with a maximum estimated population of 49 mature individuals, and another seven species are considered to be endangered.

There are currently 65 species of tapaculos recognized by the International Ornithologists' Union, distributed among 12 genera, 7 of which have only one species. The most species-rich genus is Scytalopus, with 49 species. Tapaculo diversity is highest in the Andes, where a combination of the poor flying ability of Scytalopus tapaculos and complex topography has led to high levels of population isolation, with more than 30 species having been described from the region. Despite their high diversity, Scytalopus tapaculos are difficult to differentiate on the basis of appearance and are generally described based on genetic data and differences in vocalizations. The number of known tapaculo species has drastically increased as the amount of genetic and vocal data available has increased, but diversity within the genus is likely still underestimated.

== Conventions ==
IUCN Red List categories
Conservation status
- EX: Extinct (0 species)
- EW: Extinct in the wild (0 species)
- CR: Critically endangered (1 species)
- EN: Endangered (7 species)
- VU: Vulnerable (0 species)
- NT: Near threatened (8 species)
- LC: Least concern (44 species)

Other categories
- DD: Data deficient (0 species)
- NE: Not evaluated (5 species)

Conservation status codes listed follow the International Union for Conservation of Nature (IUCN) Red List of Threatened Species. Range maps are provided wherever possible; if a range map is not available, a description of the tapaculo's range is provided. Ranges are based on the IOC World Bird List for that species unless otherwise noted. Population estimates are of the number of mature individuals and are taken from the IUCN Red List.

This list follows the taxonomic treatment (designation and order of species) and nomenclature (scientific and common names) of version 13.2 of the IOC World Bird List. Where the taxonomy proposed by the IOC World Bird List conflicts with the taxonomy followed by the IUCN (Note: The IUCN follows the taxonomy proposed by the HBW and BirdLife Taxonomic Checklist.) or the 2023 edition of The Clements Checklist of Birds of the World, the disagreement is noted next to the species's common name (for nomenclatural disagreements) or scientific name (for taxonomic disagreements).

== Classification ==
The International Ornithologists' Union (IOU) recognizes 65 species of tapaculos in 12 genera; some other authorities recognise as few as 60 species. This list does not include hybrid species, extinct prehistoric species, or putative species not yet accepted by the IOU.

- Genus Acropternis: one species
- Genus Pteroptochos: three species
- Genus Scelorchilus: two species
- Genus Rhinocrypta: one species
- Genus Teledromas: one species
- Genus Liosceles: one species
- Genus Psilorhamphus: one species
- Genus Merulaxis: two species
- Genus Eugralla: one species
- Genus Myornis: one species
- Genus Eleoscytalopus: two species
- Genus Scytalopus: forty-nine species

- Rhinocryptidae
  - - - Pteroptochos – huet-huets and moustached turca (3 species)
      - Scelorchilus – tapaculos (2 species)
    - - - Liosceles – rusty-belted tapaculo
        - Psilorhamphus – spotted bamboowren
      - - Acropternis – ocellated tapaculo
        - - Rhinocrypta – crested gallito
          - Teledromas – sandy gallito
  - - - Eleoscytalopus – tapaculos (2 species)
      - Merulaxis – bristlefronts (2 species)
    - - Myornis – ash-colored tapaculo
      - - Eugralla – ochre-flanked tapaculo
        - Scytalopus – tapaculos (49 species)

Cladogram based on a 2020 study by Harvey et al.

== Rhinocryptids ==
Genus Acropternis – Cabanis & Heine, 1859 – 1 species
Common name	Scientific name and subspecies	Range	IUCN status and estimated population
Ocellated tapaculo	A. orthonyx (Lafresnaye, 1843) Two subspecies: A. o. orthonyx; A. o. infuscatus	Northwestern South America	LC Unknown

Genus Pteroptochos – Kittlitz, 1830 – 3 species
Common name	Scientific name and subspecies	Range	IUCN status and estimated population
Chestnut-throated huet-huet	P. castaneus Philippi & Landbeck, 1864	Central Chile and west-central Argentina	LC Unknown
Black-throated huet-huet	P. tarnii (King, P. P., 1831)	Southwestern South America	LC Unknown
Moustached turca	P. megapodius Kittlitz, 1830 Two subspecies: P. m. atacamae; P. m. megapodius	Chile	LC Unknown

Genus Scelorchilus – Kittlitz, 1830 – 2 species
Common name	Scientific name and subspecies	Range	IUCN status and estimated population
White-throated tapaculo	S. albicollis (Kittlitz, 1830) Two subspecies: S. a. atacamae; S. a. albicollis	Chile	LC Unknown
Chucao tapaculo	S. rubecula (Kittlitz, 1830) Two subspecies: S. r. rubecula; S. r. mochae	Southwestern South America	LC Unknown

Genus Rhinocrypta – Gray, G. R., 1841 – 1 species
Common name	Scientific name and subspecies	Range	IUCN status and estimated population
Crested gallito	R. lanceolata (Geoffroy Saint-Hilaire, 1832) Two subspecies: R. l. saturata; R. l. lanceolata	South-central South America	LC Unknown

Genus Teledromas – Wetmore & Peters, 1922 – 1 species
Common name	Scientific name and subspecies	Range	IUCN status and estimated population
Sandy gallito	T. fuscus (Sclater, P. L. & Salvin, 1873)	Central Argentina	LC Unknown

Genus Liosceles – Sclater, P. L., 1865 – 1 species
Common name	Scientific name and subspecies	Range	IUCN status and estimated population
Rusty-belted tapaculo	L. thoracicus (Sclater, P. L., 1865) Three subspecies: L. t. dugandi; L. t. erithacus; L. t. thoracicus	Western and southwestern Amazon rainforest	LC Unknown

Genus Psilorhamphus – Sclater, P. L., 1855 – 1 species
Common name	Scientific name and subspecies	Range	IUCN status and estimated population
Spotted bamboowren	P. guttatus (Ménétriés, 1835)	Brazil and northeastern Argentina	LC Unknown

Genus Merulaxis – Lesson, R. P., 1831 – 2 species
Common name	Scientific name and subspecies	Range	IUCN status and estimated population
Slaty bristlefront	M. ater Lesson, R. P., 1831	Southeastern Brazil	LC Unknown
Stresemann's bristlefront	M. stresemanni Sick, 1960	Eastern Brazil	CR 1–49

Genus Eugralla – Lesson, R. P., 1842 – 1 species
Common name	Scientific name and subspecies	Range	IUCN status and estimated population
Ochre-flanked tapaculo	E. paradoxa (Kittlitz, 1830)	Southwestern South America	LC Unknown

Genus Myornis – Chapman, 1915 – 1 species
Common name	Scientific name and subspecies	Range	IUCN status and estimated population
Ash-colored tapaculo	M. senilis (Lafresnaye, 1840)	Northwestern South America	LC Unknown

Genus Eleoscytalopus – Maurício, Mata, Bornschein, Cadena, Alvarenga & Bonatto, 2008 – 2 species
Common name	Scientific name and subspecies	Range	IUCN status and estimated population
White-breasted tapaculo	E. indigoticus (Wied, 1831)	Southeastern Brazil	LC Unknown
Bahia tapaculo	E. psychopompus (Teixeira & Carnevalli, 1989)	Eastern Brazil	EN 250–999

Genus Scytalopus – Gould, 1837 – 49 species
Common name	Scientific name and subspecies	Range	IUCN status and estimated population
Marsh tapaculo	S. iraiensis Bornschein, Reinert & Pichorim, 1998	Southern Brazil	EN 250–999
Diamantina tapaculo	S. diamantinensis Bornschein, Maurício, Belmonte-Lopes, Mata & Bonatto, 2007	Northeastern Brazil	EN 2500–9999
Brasília tapaculo	S. novacapitalis Sick, 1958	Southern Brazil	EN Unknown
Rock tapaculo	S. petrophilus Whitney, de Vasconcelos, Silveira & Pacheco, 2010	Southeastern Brazil	LC Unknown
Planalto tapaculo	S. pachecoi Maurício, 2005	Southeastern Brazil and northeastern Argentina	LC Unknown
Boa Nova tapaculo	S. gonzagai Maurício, Belmonte-Lopes, Pacheco, Silveira, Whitney & Bornschein, 2014	Southeastern Brazil	EN 1000–2499
Mouse-colored tapaculo	S. speluncae (Ménétries, 1835)	Southeastern Brazil	LC Unknown
Dusky tapaculo	S. fuscus Gould, 1837	Central Chile	LC Unknown
Magellanic tapaculo	S. magellanicus (Gmelin, J. F., 1789)	Chile and Argentina	LC Unknown
Ancash tapaculo	S. affinis Zimmer, J. T., 1939	Western Peru	LC Unknown
White-winged tapaculo	S. krabbei Schulenberg, Lane, Spencer, AJ, Angulo & Cadena, 2020	North-central Peru	NE Unknown
Loja tapaculo	S. androstictus Krabbe and Cadena, 2010	Southeastern Ecuador and northern Peru	NE Unknown
Paramo tapaculo	S. opacus Zimmer, J. T., 1941	Central Colombia to south-central Ecuador	LC Unknown
Paramillo tapaculo	S. canus Chapman, 1915	Western Colombia	NT 3300–15500
White-browed tapaculo	S. superciliaris Cabanis, 1883 Two subspecies: S. s. superciliaris; S. s. santabarbarae	Northwestern Argentina	LC Unknown
Zimmer's tapaculo	S. zimmeri Bond, J. & Meyer de Schauensee, 1940	Southern Bolivia and northwestern Argentina	LC Unknown
Puna tapaculo	S. simonsi Chubb, C., 1917	Southeastern Peru to central Bolivia	LC Unknown
Diademed tapaculo	S. schulenbergi Whitney, 1994	Southeastern Peru to central Bolivia	LC Unknown
Vilcabamba tapaculo	S. urubambae Zimmer, J. T., 1939	East-central Peru	LC 2500–9999
Ampay tapaculo	S. whitneyi Krabbe et al., 2020	Southern Peru	NE Unknown
Jalca tapaculo	S. frankeae Krabbe et al., 2020	Central Peru	NE Unknown
Neblina tapaculo	S. altirostris Zimmer, J. T., 1939	Northern Peru	LC Unknown
Trilling tapaculo	S. parvirostris Zimmer, J. T., 1939	North-central Peru to east-central Bolivia	LC Unknown
Bolivian tapaculo	S. bolivianus Allen, J. A., 1889	Southeastern Peru to southern Bolivia	LC Unknown
White-crowned tapaculo	S. atratus Hellmayr, 1922 Three subspecies: S. a. nigricans; S. a. atratus; S. a. confusus	Northwestern South America	LC Unknown
Santa Marta tapaculo	S. sanctaemartae Chapman, 1915	Northern Colombia	NT 22000
Long-tailed tapaculo	S. micropterus (Sclater, P. L., 1858)	Colombia to northern Peru	LC Unknown
Rufous-vented tapaculo	S. femoralis (Tschudi, 1844)	Central Peru	LC Unknown
Utcubamba tapaculo	S. intermedius Zimmer, J. T., 1939	North-central Peru	NE Unknown
Large-footed tapaculo	S. macropus Berlepsch & Stolzmann, 1896	Peru	LC Unknown
Junin tapaculo	S. gettyae Hosner et al., 2013	Central Peru	NT 10000–19999
Unicolored tapaculo	S. unicolor Salvin, 1895	West-central Peru	NT 8500–11500
Tschudi's tapaculo	S. acutirostris (Tschudi, 1844)	Central Peru	LC 140,000
Blackish tapaculo	S. latrans Hellmayr, 1924 Two subspecies: S. l. latrans; S. l. subcinereus	Northwestern South America	LC Unknown
Silvery-fronted tapaculo	S. argentifrons Ridgway, 1891 Two subspecies: S. a. argentifrons; S. a. chiriquensis	Costa Rica and Panama	LC 50000–499999
Nariño tapaculo	S. vicinior Zimmer, J. T., 1939	Northwestern South America	LC Unknown
Tacarcuna tapaculo	S. panamensis Chapman, 1915	Eastern Panama and northwestern Colombia	NT 2500–9999
Chocó tapaculo	S. chocoensis Krabbe & Schulenberg, 1997	Eastern Panama to northwestern Ecuador	LC Unknown
Magdalena tapaculo	S. rodriguezi Krabbe et al., 2005 Two subspecies: S. r. yariguiorum; S. r. rodriguezi	Central Colombia	EN 1500–7000
Stiles's tapaculo	S. stilesi Cuervo et al., 2005	Central Colombia	LC 40000–180000
Tatama tapaculo	S. alvarezlopezi Cuervo et al., 2005	Western Colombia	NT 20000–49999
El Oro tapaculo	S. robbinsi Krabbe & Schulenberg, 1997	Southwestern Ecuador	EN 1900–5000
Caracas tapaculo	S. caracae Hellmayr, 1922	Northern Venezuela	LC Unknown
Pale-bellied tapaculo	S. griseicollis (Lafresnaye, 1840) Three subspecies: S. g. gilesi; S. g. griseicollis; S. g. morenoi	Northwestern South America	LC Unknown
Brown-rumped tapaculo	S. latebricola Bangs, 1899	Northern Colombia	NT Unknown
Perijá tapaculo	S. perijanus Avendaño et al., 2015	Perijá Mountains	NT 10000–19999
Mérida tapaculo	S. meridanus Hellmayr, 1922 Two subspecies: S. m. meridanus; S. m. fuscicauda	Northwestern Venezuela	LC Unknown
Chusquea tapaculo	S. parkeri Krabbe & Schulenberg, 1997	Northwestern South America	LC Unknown
Spillmann's tapaculo	S. spillmanni Stresemann, 1937	Northwestern South America	LC Unknown
