= Gallito =

Gallito may refer to:

- Crested gallito (Rhinocrypta lanceolata), a species of bird
- Sandy gallito (Teledromas fuscus), a species of bird
- Erythrina fusca, a species of flowering tree
- Gallito (song), a song Jonathan Roberts danced to on Dancing with the Stars
- El Gallito, a 2004 song by Aidan Girt

== See also ==
- Gallitos de Isabela, a nickname given to people from the city of Isabela, Puerto Rico
  - Sixto Escobar (1913–1979), first world boxing champion from Puerto Rico, nicknamed "Gallito de Isabela"
- Gallitos, a Puerto Rican game
