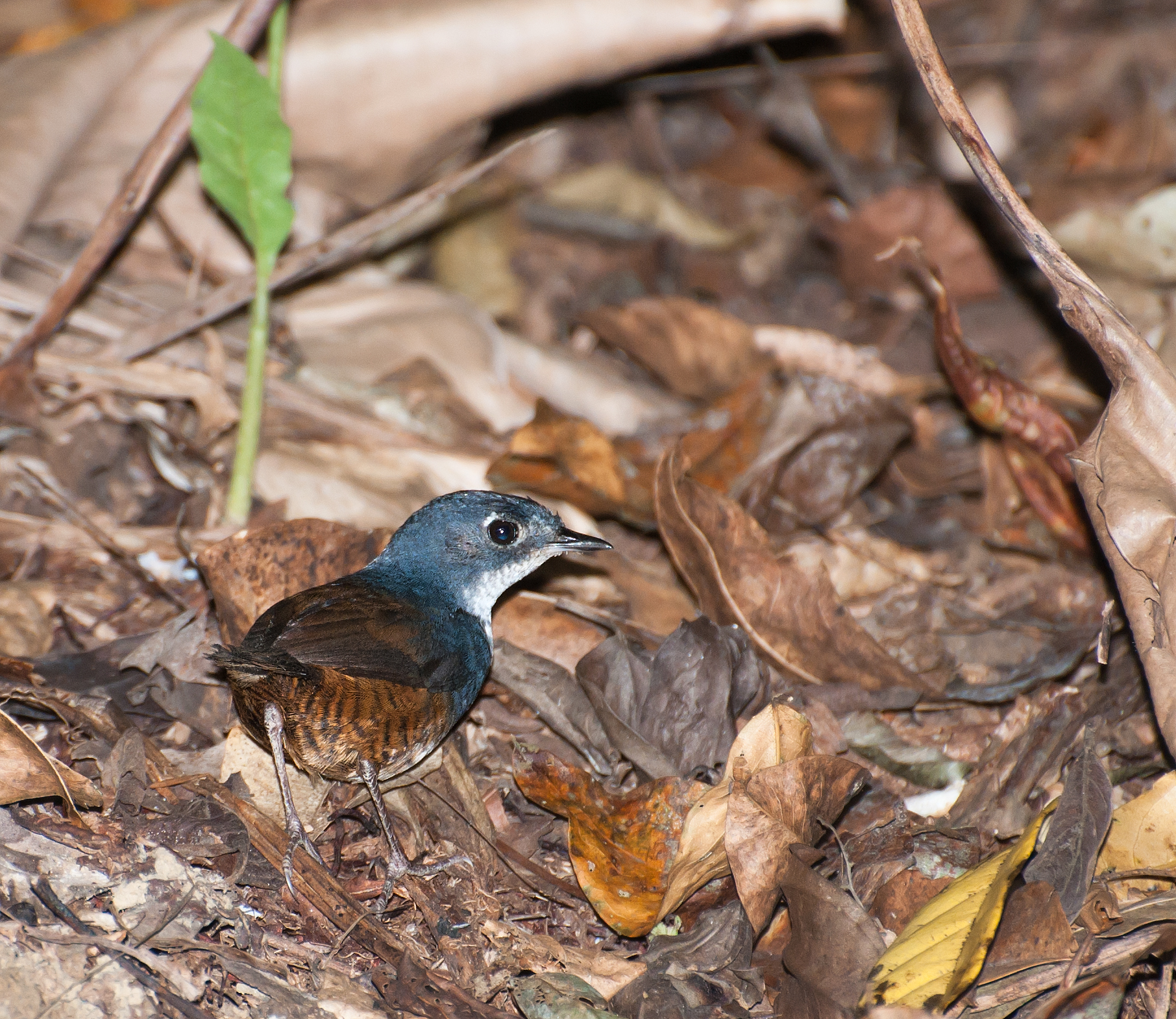
- White-breasted tapaculo (Eleoscytalopus indigoticus)

Scientific classification
- Kingdom: Animalia
- Phylum: Chordata
- Class: Aves
- Order: Passeriformes
- Family: Rhinocryptidae
- Genus: Eleoscytalopus; Maurício, Mata, Bornschein, Cadena, Alvarenga & Bonatto, 2008

Type species
- Myiothera indigotica zu Wied, 1831

Species
- Eleoscytalopus indigoticus Eleoscytalopus psychopompus

= Eleoscytalopus =

Genus of birds

Eleoscytalopus is a genus of tapaculos found in lowland Atlantic forest of eastern Brazil. Until recently, they were included in the genus Scytalopus, but the two species are actually closer to the bristlefronts (genus Merulaxis). Unlike the members of the genus Scytalopus, the members of Eleoscytalopus have largely white underparts and bluish-grey upperparts. The voices of the members of the two genera also differ.

== Species ==
Genus Eleoscytalopus – Maurício, Mata, Bornschein, Cadena, Alvarenga & Bonatto, 2008 – two species
Common name	Scientific name and subspecies	Range	Size and ecology	IUCN status and estimated population
White-breasted tapaculo	Eleoscytalopus indigoticus (Wied, 1831)	Atlantic forest in south-eastern Brazil.	Size: Habitat: Diet:	LC
Bahia tapaculo	Eleoscytalopus psychopompus (Teixeira & Carnevalli, 1989)	Atlantic forests in Bahia, Brazil	Size: Habitat: Diet:	EN
