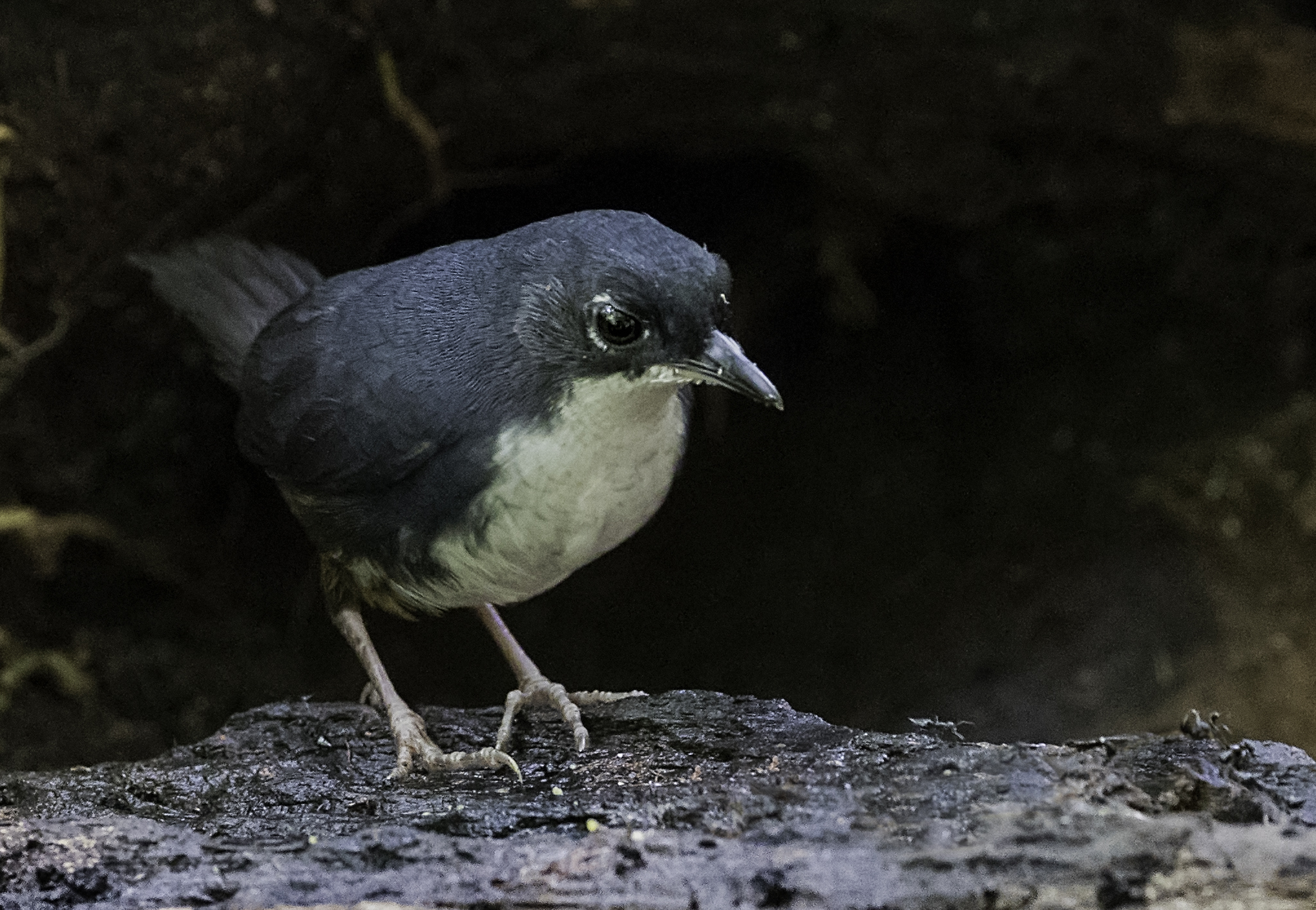

Conservation status
- Endangered (IUCN 3.1)

Scientific classification
- Kingdom: Animalia
- Phylum: Chordata
- Class: Aves
- Order: Passeriformes
- Family: Rhinocryptidae
- Genus: Eleoscytalopus
- Species: E. psychopompus

Binomial name
- Eleoscytalopus psychopompus (Teixeira & Carnevalli, 1989)

Synonyms
- Scytalopus psychopompus

= Bahia tapaculo =

Species of bird in Brazil

The Bahia tapaculo (Eleoscytalopus psychopompus) is a species of bird in the family Rhinocryptidae. It is endemic to lowland Atlantic forest in Bahia, Brazil.

== Taxonomy and systematics ==
The Bahia tapaculo and the white-breasted tapaculo (Eleoscytalopus indigoticus) were formerly placed in the genus Scytalopus, but these two species are now known to be more closely related to the bristlefronts (genus Merulaxis). The Bahia tapaculo has also been proposed as a race of the white-breasted tapaculo, but genetic data refute that.

== Description ==
Until the 1990s the Bahia tapaculo was known from only three specimens. Surveys targeting it have resulted in sight, photographic, and audio records since then. Based on the specimens, the white-breasted tapaculo is 11 cm (4.3 in) long. One male weighed 17.5 g (0.62 oz) and one female18 g (0.63 oz). The adult's upper parts are blue-gray and its rump reddish brown. The throat, chest, and belly are white and the flanks and vent area are chestnut without the barring that the very similar white-breasted tapaculo has.

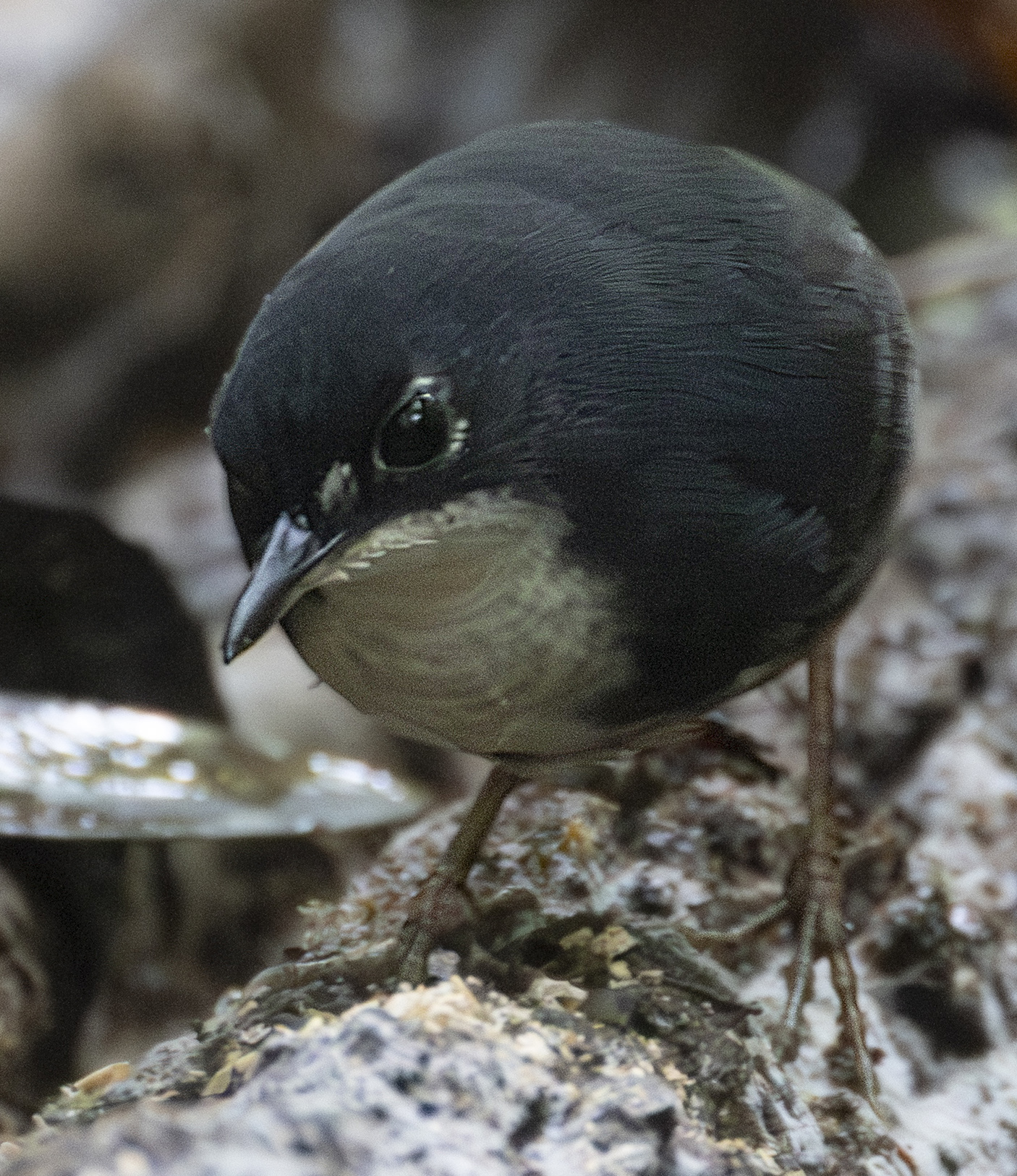
NE Brazil

== Distribution and habitat ==
The Bahia tapaculo is known from only a few municipalities in eastern Brazil's Bahia state. It inhabits the understory of mature lowland forest at up to 50 m (160 ft) elevation, staying in dense cover near small streams.

== Behavior ==
Nothing is known about the Bahia tapaculo's diet or feeding habits. The only data related to breeding is that a male and female collected in October 1983 had active gonads. The song is a trill up to four seconds long that increases in volume after the first one or two seconds.

== Status ==
The IUCN has assessed the Bahia tapaculo as Endangered. Until recently, it was feared extinct, but has since been rediscovered and is now known from the municipalities of Igrapiúna, Una, Ilhéus, Maraú, Taperoá, and Valença. It remains highly threatened by habitat loss.
