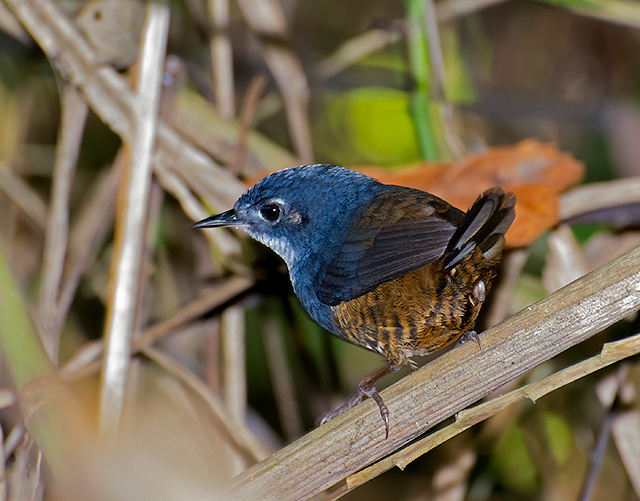

Conservation status
- Least Concern (IUCN 3.1)

Scientific classification
- Kingdom: Animalia
- Phylum: Chordata
- Class: Aves
- Order: Passeriformes
- Family: Rhinocryptidae
- Genus: Eleoscytalopus
- Species: E. indigoticus

Binomial name
- Eleoscytalopus indigoticus (Wied, 1831)

Synonyms
- Scytalopus indigoticus

= White-breasted tapaculo =

Species of bird

The white-breasted tapaculo (Eleoscytalopus indigoticus) is a species of bird in the family Rhinocryptidae. It is endemic to the Atlantic forest of southeastern Brazil.

== Taxonomy and systematics ==
The white-breasted tapaculo and the Bahia tapaculo (Eleoscytalopus psychopompus) were formerly placed in the genus Scytalopus, but these two species are now known to be more closely related to the bristlefronts (genus Merulaxis). The Bahia tapaculo has also been proposed as a race of the white-breasted tapaculo, but genetic data refute that. The genetic data also show large differences between the northern and southern populations of white-breasted tapaculo.

== Description ==
The white-breasted tapaculo is 11 cm (4.3 in) long. Males weigh 13 to 18 g (0.46 to 0.63 oz) and females 12.2 to 16 g (0.43 to 0.56 oz). The male's upper parts are blue-gray and its rump reddish brown. The throat, chest, and belly are white and the flanks and vent area are chestnut with dark barring. Males in a small part of its range have more extensive dark underparts. Females and immatures are similar to the males but have browner upper parts.

== Distribution and habitat ==
The white-breasted tapaculo is found in Brazilian states from eastern Bahia south to northeastern Rio Grande do Sul, including western Paraná and eastern Santa Catarina. It inhabits the undergrowth of open forest, forest edges, and dense secondary forest. In elevation it ranges up to 1,500 m (4,900 ft).

== Behavior ==
=== Feeding ===
The white-breasted tapaculo feeds on insects captured on or very near the ground.

=== Breeding ===
One nest was constructed of roots and moss and buried in leaves by a tree trunk. It contained two eggs.

=== Vocalization ===
The white-breasted tapaculo's song is a seven to eight second trill that increases in volume after the first one or two seconds . It often sings inside tree cavities.

== Status ==
The IUCN has assessed the white-breasted tapaculo as least concern. It has a relatively small and highly fragmented range that is under continuing human pressure. Its population size is not known but is believed to be decreasing. It does occur in some protected areas, many of which are small.
