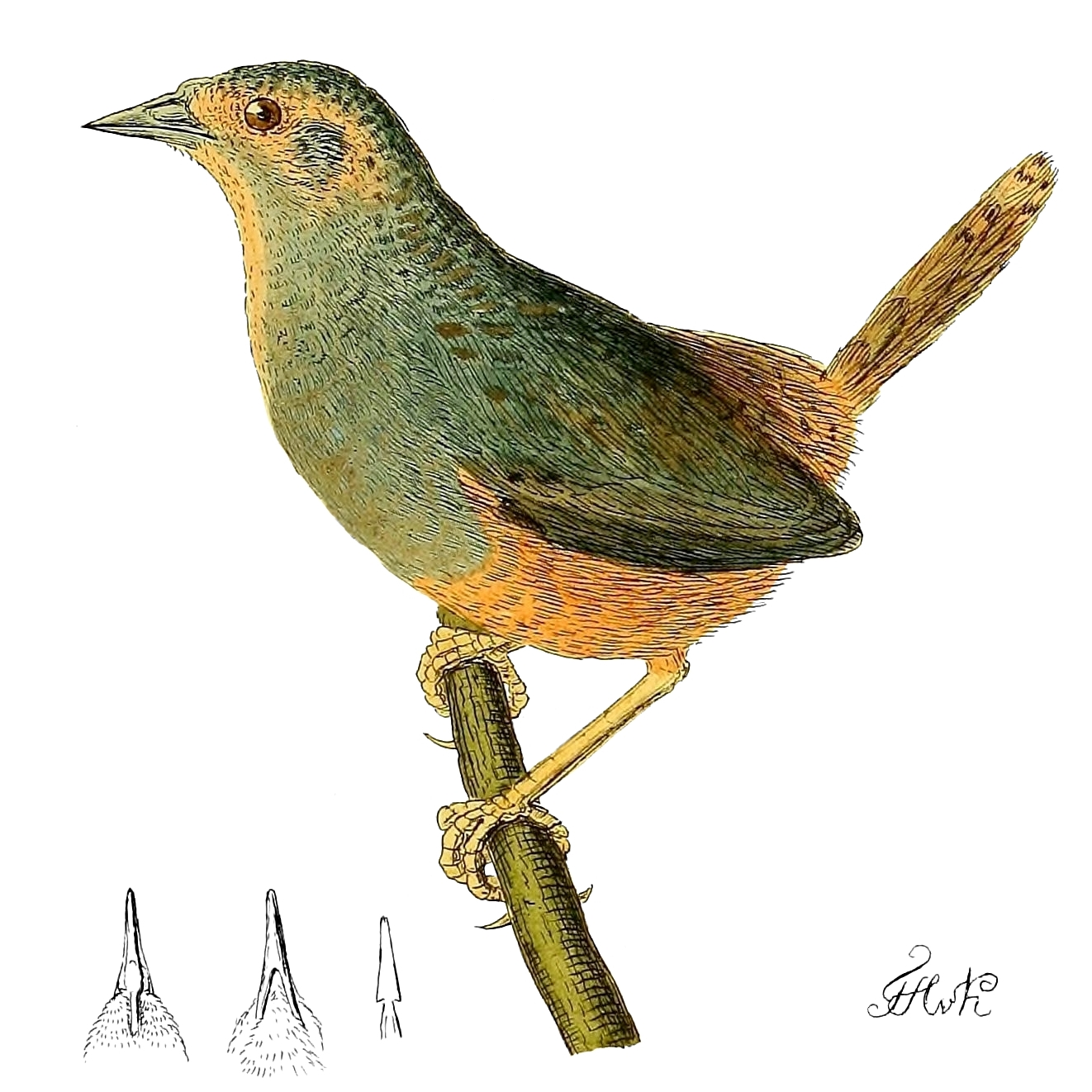
- Illustration by Heinrich von Kittlitz Calls recorded in Nahuelbuta National Park, Chile
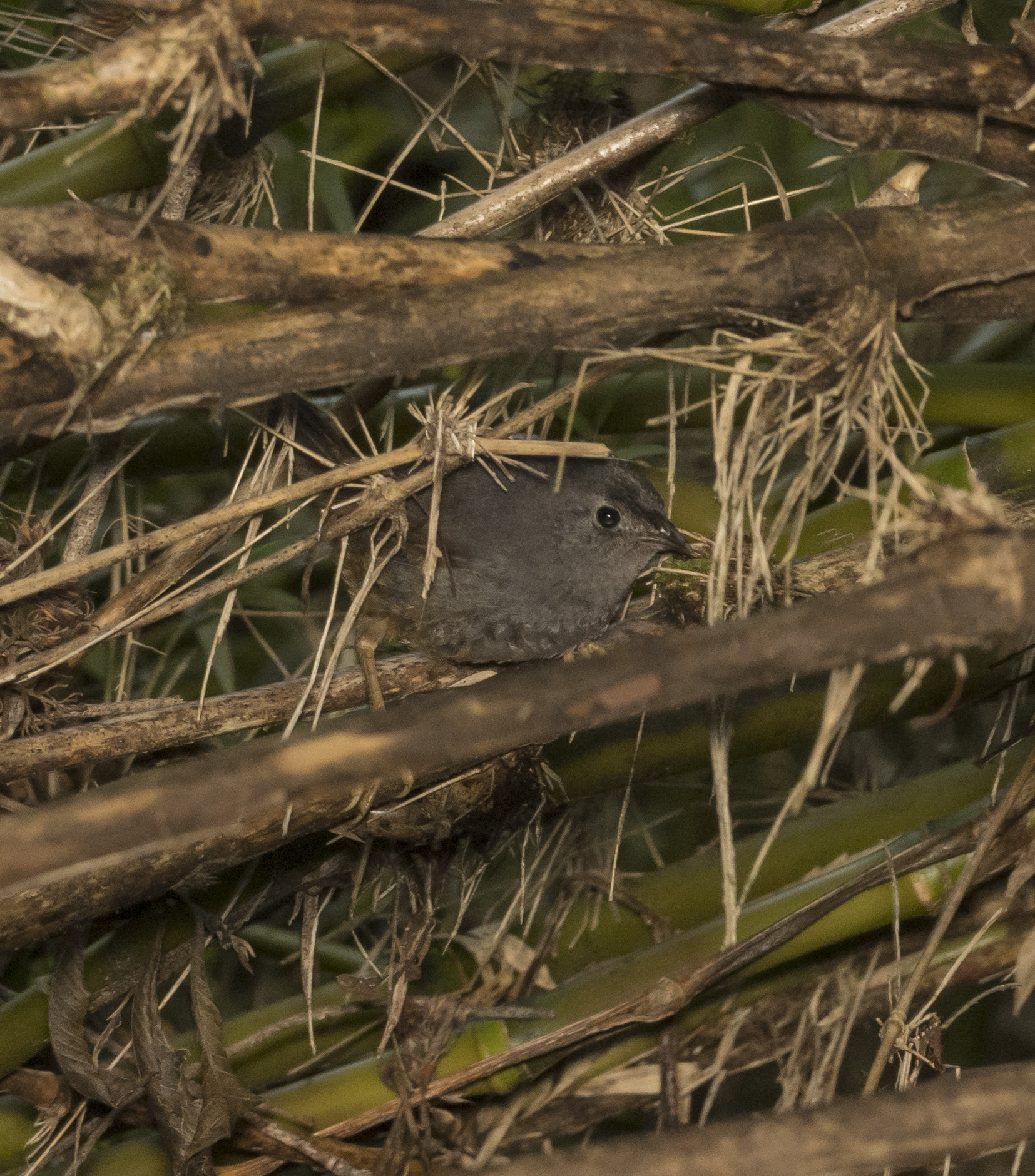
- Live bird in Chile

Conservation status
- Least Concern (IUCN 3.1)

Scientific classification
- Kingdom: Animalia
- Phylum: Chordata
- Class: Aves
- Order: Passeriformes
- Family: Rhinocryptidae
- Genus: Eugralla; Lesson, 1842
- Species: E. paradoxa

Binomial name
- Eugralla paradoxa (Kittlitz, 1830)

= Ochre-flanked tapaculo =

Species of bird

The ochre-flanked tapaculo (Eugralla paradoxa) is a species of bird in the family Rhinocryptidae. It is found in south-central Chile and adjacent western Argentina.

== Taxonomy and systematics ==
The ochre-flanked tapaculo is the only member of the genus Eugralla and has no subspecies. It had at one time been assigned to genus Triptohinus but Eugralla has priority.

== Description ==
The ochre-flanked tapaculo is 14.5 cm (5.7 in) long. Two males weighed 28.6 and 30.5 g (1.01 and 1.08 oz) and other specimens of unknown sex weighed 25.5 to 29 g (0.90 to 1.02 oz). The adults' upper parts are dark gray, the underparts as far as the abdomen paler gray, and the abdomen and vent are clay brown. The flanks are tawny brown The juvenile is barred throughout with cinnamon to rufous over dusky gray. Unusual for a tapaculo, it has a "Roman nose" facial profile.

== Distribution and habitat ==
The ochre-flanked tapaculo is a year round resident of south-central Chile (Maule Region to Los Lagos Region) and the western parts of the adjoining Argentinian provinces of Neuquén, Río Negro, and Chubut. It is found from sea level to 900 m (3,000 ft) and perhaps higher, where it inhabits dense undergrowth and bamboo in Nothofagus and mature secondary forest.

== Behavior ==
=== Feeding ===
The ochre-flanked tapaculo forages in pairs on and near the ground in dense cover. Its primary prey is thought to be arthropods.

=== Breeding ===
The ochre-flanked tapaculo is known to "double brood", laying eggs in September and again in November. The nest is a large ball of straw and grass with a side entrance that is usually placed 1 to 2 m (3.3 to 6.6 ft) above ground, though sometimes as high as 7 m (23 ft). Nests have been found in thick bushes, small trees, and piles of branches.

=== Vocalization ===
The ochre-flanked tapaculo's song is a short series of sharp "check" notes . The members of a pair keep in contact with a softer "kek" call .

== Status ==
The IUCN has assessed the ochre-flanked tapaculo as being of Least Concern. It has a fairly large range and is common in the southern part of it. It inhabits several protected areas in Chile. However, the population's number is unknown and is believed to be slowly decreasing.
