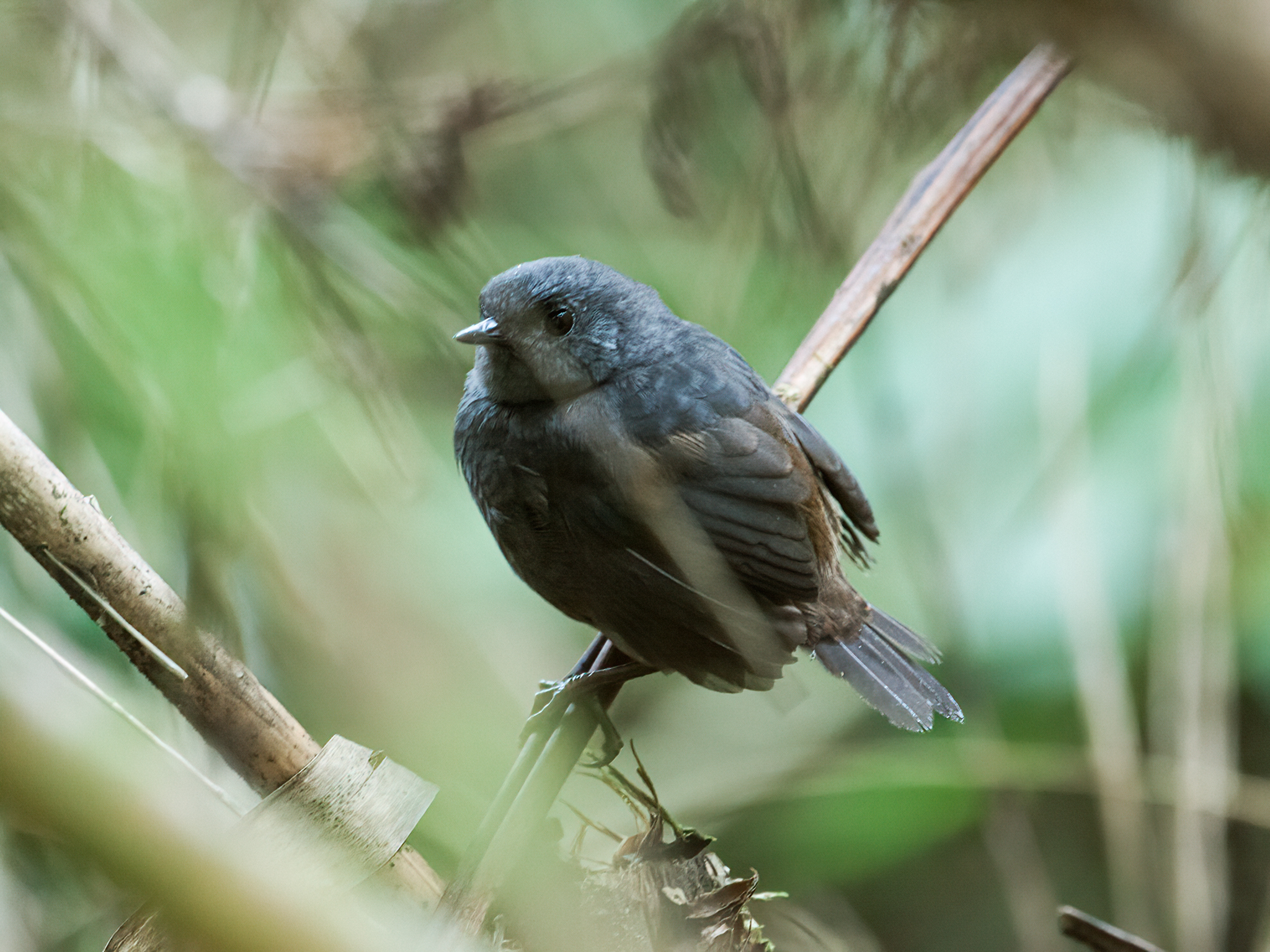

Conservation status
- Least Concern (IUCN 3.1)

Scientific classification
- Kingdom: Animalia
- Phylum: Chordata
- Class: Aves
- Order: Passeriformes
- Family: Rhinocryptidae
- Genus: Scytalopus
- Species: S. parkeri

Binomial name
- Scytalopus parkeri Krabbe & Schulenberg, 1997

= Chusquea tapaculo =

Species of bird

The chusquea tapaculo (Scytalopus parkeri) is a species of bird in the family Rhinocryptidae. It is found in southern Ecuador and far northern Peru.

== Taxonomy and systematics ==
The chusquea tapaculo is monotypic. It and Spillmann's tapaculo (Scytalopus spillmanni) form a superspecies.

== Description ==
Male chusquea tapaculos weigh 21 to 24.4 g (0.74 to 0.86 oz) and females 18.8 to 22.3 g (0.66 to 0.79 oz). Adults of both sexes are dark gray above and lighter gray below. The lower back and rump are brown. The lower belly is yellowish and the flanks and vent area are yellowish to cinnamon with blackish bars. Juveniles are lightish brown above with blackish bars; the underparts are dark with pale bars.

== Distribution and habitat ==
The chusquea tapaculo is found only in southern Ecuador and northernmost Peru, from the East Andes and the Chilla Mountains of Ecuador south to Cordillera del Cóndor that straddles the Ecuador-Peru border. As its name implies, the chusquea tapaculo inhabits Chusquea bamboo stands and adjacent undergrowth in humid montane forest. In Ecuador it ranges in elevation from 2,250 to 3,350 m (7,380 to 10,990 ft) but in Peru only to 2,900 m (9,500 ft)

== Behavior ==
=== Feeding ===
Very little is known about the chusquea tapaculo's diet except that it appears to be mostly insects. Nothing has been published about its foraging behavior.

=== Breeding ===
The chusquea tapacolo's nest is a ball of moss lined with fine fibers and placed in a natural cavity in an earthen bank. The only two clutches described each had two eggs. At one nest both adults incubated the eggs. Though year round nesting has been suggested, most breeding in far southeastern Ecuador was between August and December.

=== Vocalization ===
The male chusquea tapaculo's song is a series of 10 to 12 notes that fall in pitch and then level off . What appears to be an excited call is this .

== Status ==
The IUCN has assessed the chusquea tapaculo as being of Least Concern. Much of its range is within preserves and other protected areas.
