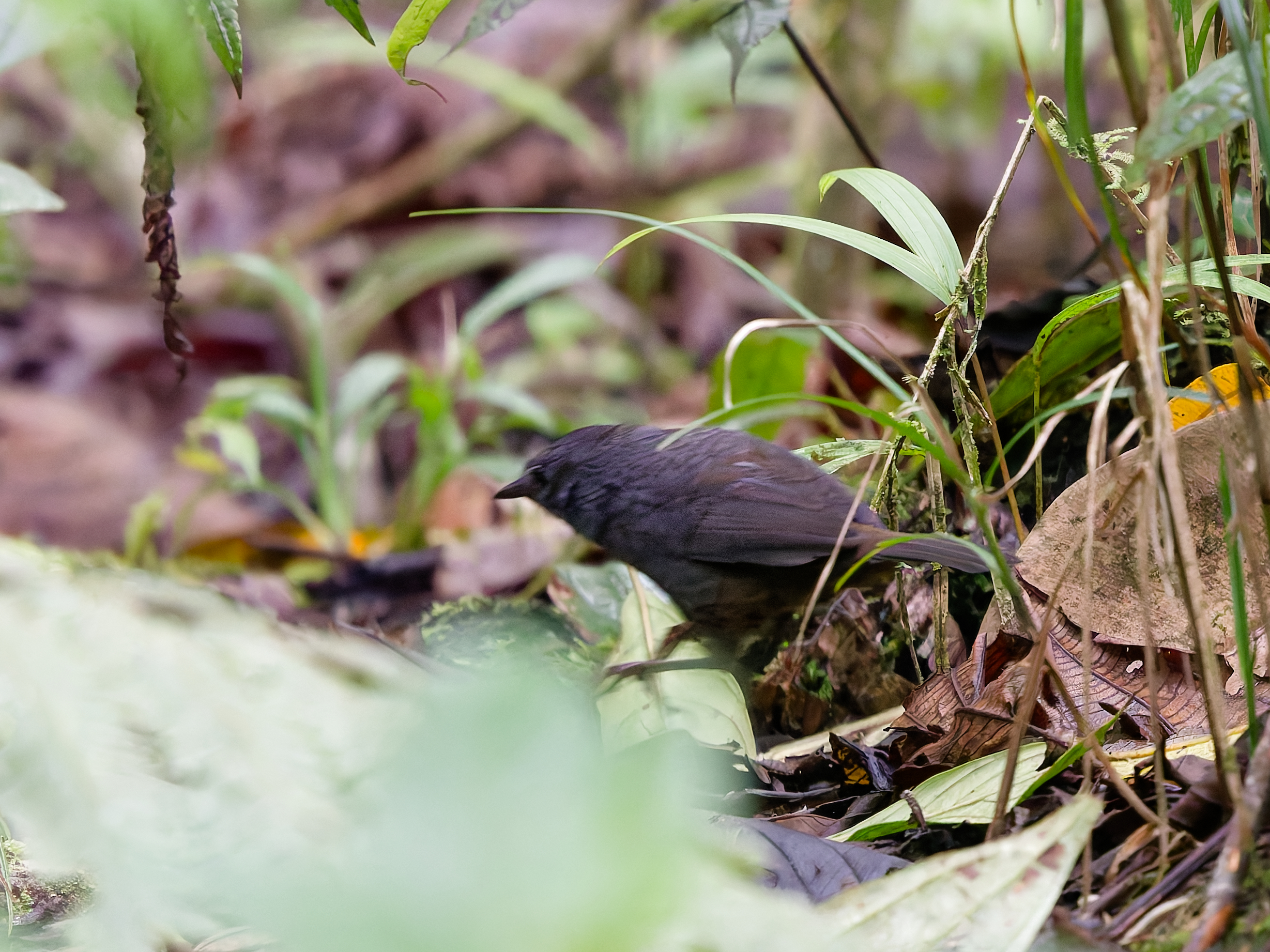

Conservation status
- Least Concern (IUCN 3.1)

Scientific classification
- Kingdom: Animalia
- Phylum: Chordata
- Class: Aves
- Order: Passeriformes
- Family: Rhinocryptidae
- Genus: Scytalopus
- Species: S. femoralis

Binomial name
- Scytalopus femoralis (Tschudi, 1844)

= Rufous-vented tapaculo =

Species of bird

The rufous-vented tapaculo (Scytalopus femoralis) is a species of bird in the family Rhinocryptidae. It is endemic to Peru.

== Taxonomy and systematics ==
The rufous-vented tapaculo has no subspecies. However, what are now the Santa Marta tapaculo (Scytalopus sanctaemartae), long-tailed tapaculo (S. micropterus), white-crowned tapaculo (S. atratus), and Bolivian tapaculo (S. bolivianus) were formerly treated as subspecies of it.

== Description ==
The rufous-vented tapaculo is 12.5 cm (4.9 in) long. Males weigh 21 to 28 g (0.74 to 0.99 oz) and females 20 to 24 g (0.71 to 0.85 oz). Adults have a dark brown head and back with a dark brown wash and the rump is dark reddish brown. The throat, breast, and belly are a paler gray; flanks and vent area are cinnamon with broad dark bars. The juvenile is brown above with faint bars and yellow buff with dark bars below.

== Distribution and habitat ==
The rufous-vented tapaculo is found in the central Andes of Peru from southern Amazonas south to Junín. There it inhabits the undergrowth of both primary and secondary humid forest. It ranges between 1,000 and 2,050 m (3,280 and 6,730 ft) elevations, but is usually found above 1,600 m (5,200 ft) and in a few locations as high as 2,550 m (8,370 ft).

== Behavior ==
No information has been published about the rufous-vented tapaculo's feeding or breeding phenologies. Its song is a single descending note repeated for several minutes .

== Status ==
The IUCN has assessed the rufous-vented tapaculo as being of Least Concern. The species has a very large range, and though the population number has not been determined, it is believed to be fairly large and stable.
