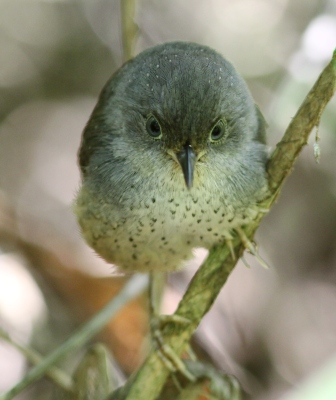

Conservation status
- Least Concern (IUCN 3.1)

Scientific classification
- Kingdom: Animalia
- Phylum: Chordata
- Class: Aves
- Order: Passeriformes
- Family: Rhinocryptidae
- Genus: Psilorhamphus; P.L. Sclater, 1855
- Species: P. guttatus

Binomial name
- Psilorhamphus guttatus (Ménétriés, 1835)

= Spotted bamboowren =

Species of bird

The spotted bamboowren (Psilorhamphus guttatus) is a species of suboscine passerine bird in the tapaculo family Rhinocryptidae. It is the only species placed in the genus Psilorhamphus. It is found in southeastern Brazil, far northeastern Argentina, and possibly Paraguay.

== Taxonomy ==
The spotted bamboowren is the only member of its genus and has no subspecies. It has at various times been placed in families Formicariidae (the antthrushes), Sylviidae ("typical" warblers), Thamnophilidae (antbirds), Troglodytidae (wrens), and Polioptilidae (gnatcatchers). Studies of its morphology and later of its genetics have firmly placed it in the tapaculo family.

The spotted bamboowren is genetically most closely related to the rusty-belted tapaculo (Liosceles thoracicus).

== Description ==
The spotted bamboowren measures 13.5 cm (5.3 in) in length. Males weigh between 10.5 and 13 g (0.37 and 0.46 oz), while a female specimen weighed 11.5 g (0.41 oz). Adult males have gray heads and upper backs, with brownish lower backs. The throat and upper breast are whitish to buff, transitioning to buff on the lower breast and belly. The back, wings, and belly are speckled with small white, brown, or black spots. Adult females are similar in appearance, but with brown tops of the head and upper backs, and buffy upper breasts.

== Distribution and habitat ==
The spotted bamboowren is endemic to the Atlantic Forest biome of Brazil and Argentina. Its range extends from southeastern Minas Gerais and western Espírito Santo through Rio Grande do Sul in Brazil into Argentina's northern Misiones Province. It might also occur in southeastern Paraguay, though the South American Classification Committee of the American Ornithological Society (AOS) has not confirmed that.

As its name implies, the spotted bamboowren is usually found in bamboo, typically at the edge of dense forest, but also in tangles of vines and other dense foliage. In the northern part of its range it is found from 600 to 1,000 m (2,000 to 3,300 ft) elevation and in the south from 300 m (980 ft) up.

== Behavior ==
=== Feeding ===
The spotted bamboowren typically feeds around 2 m (6.6 ft) above ground in bamboo and branches but up to 7 m (23 ft) in vine tangles. It occasionally forages on the ground. Its principle prey is insects and insect larvae.

=== Breeding ===
The spotted bamboowren's breeding phenology has not been studied.

=== Vocalization ===
The spotted bamboowren's song is described as "wood-wood-wood" repeated for up to 20 seconds with changing pitch and volume .

== Status ==
The IUCN has assessed the spotted bamboowren as least concern. Its range is restricted to the southern Atlantic Forest, a biome that has undergone extensive clearing for agriculture and human settlement. Its population is unknown but is believed to be decreasing. It does, however, inhabit a few protected areas.
