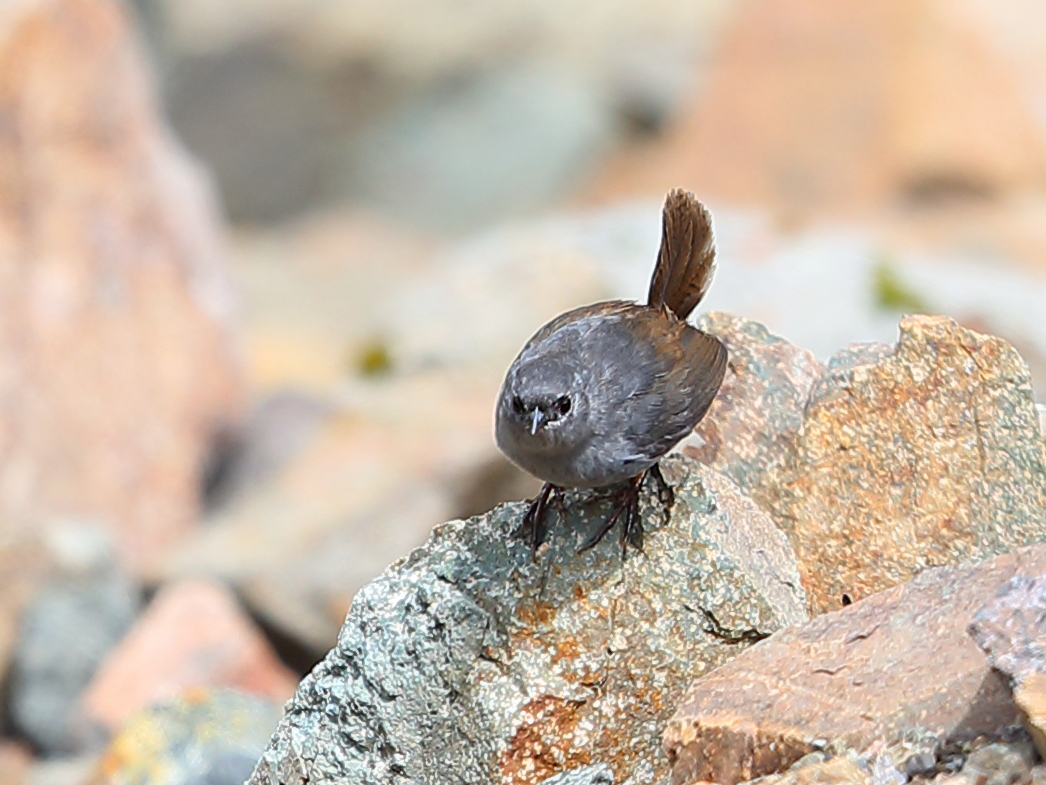

Conservation status
- Least Concern (IUCN 3.1)

Scientific classification
- Kingdom: Animalia
- Phylum: Chordata
- Class: Aves
- Order: Passeriformes
- Family: Rhinocryptidae
- Genus: Scytalopus
- Species: S. affinis

Binomial name
- Scytalopus affinis Zimmer, 1939

= Ancash tapaculo =

Species of bird

The Ancash tapaculo (Scytalopus affinis) is a species of bird in the family Rhinocryptidae. It is endemic to Peru.

== Taxonomy and systematics ==
The Ancash tapaculo was originally described as Scytalopus magellanicus affinis, a subspecies of Magellanic tapaculo. Following a study published in 1997, it was elevated to species rank because of differences in their vocalizations.

== Description ==
The male Ancash tapaculo's head and upper back are gray and the rest of the upper parts dark brown. The underparts are pale gray, and the flanks and vent are buffy with distinct bars. The female is similar but the upper parts are browner. The juvenile's head and upper back are brownish gray and the rest of the upper parts olive brown; all are barred. The underparts are gray, and the flanks and vent are olive brown with dusky bars.

== Distribution and habitat ==
The Ancash tapaculo was described from the Department of Ancash, Peru. Since then it has been recorded in the adjoining departments of La Libertad, Huánuco, and Lima. It is found at elevations of 3,000 to 4,600 m (9,800 to 15,100 ft).

It inhabits tussocky high elevation grassland and rocky areas with grass. It is often found in or near Polylepis woodland or Gynoxys shrubs.

== Behavior ==
=== Feeding ===
Little is known about the Ancash tapaculo's diet and foraging phenology, though the species is assumed to be insectivorous.

=== Breeding ===
There is also little known about the Ancash tapaculo's breeding behavior. Two nests were balls of grass and moss with a side entrance. Eggs and nestlings have been reported in February.

=== Vocalization ===
The Ancash tapaculo's song is a "churr" note repeated for 30 or more seconds . The scold call is also a "churr", but longer and dryer than those of the song .

== Status ==
The IUCN has assessed the Ancash tapaculo as being of Least Concern. Though it has a small range and an unknown population size, the population appears to be stable and not under immediate threat.
