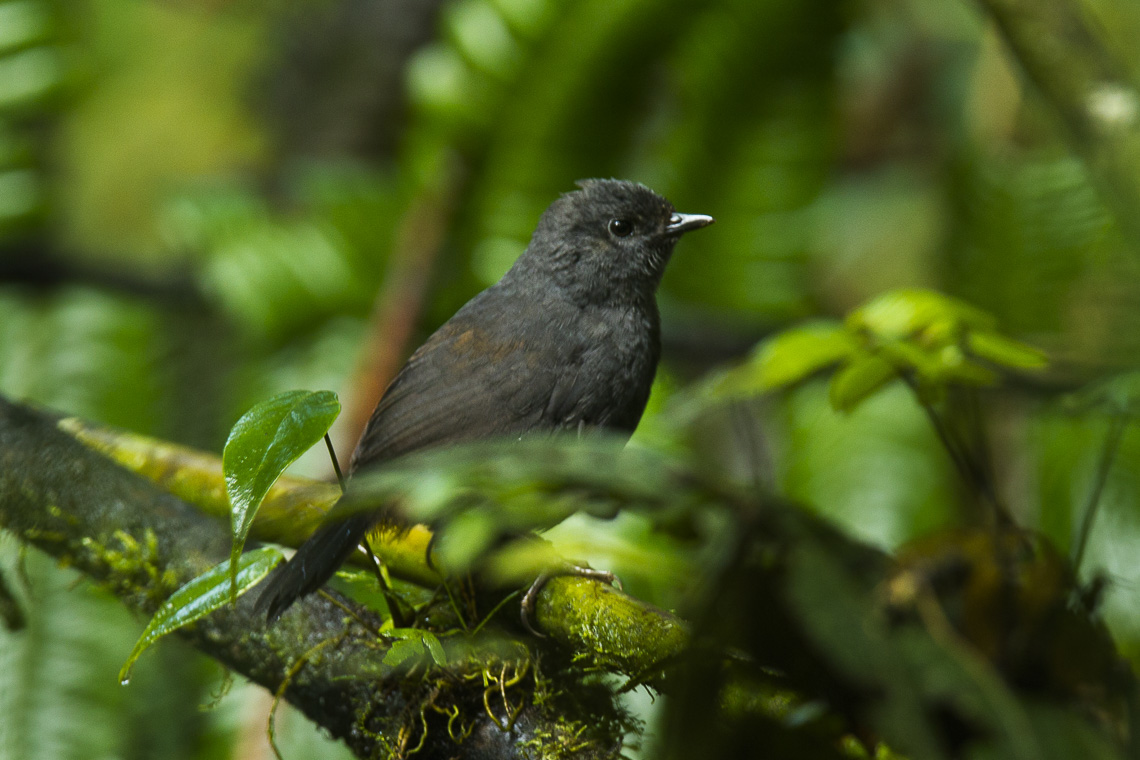

Conservation status
- Least Concern (IUCN 3.1)

Scientific classification
- Kingdom: Animalia
- Phylum: Chordata
- Class: Aves
- Order: Passeriformes
- Family: Rhinocryptidae
- Genus: Scytalopus
- Species: S. micropterus

Binomial name
- Scytalopus micropterus (Sclater, PL, 1858)

Audio

= Long-tailed tapaculo =

Species of bird

The long-tailed tapaculo (Scytalopus micropterus) is a species of bird in the family Rhinocryptidae. It is found in the eastern Andes of Colombia, Ecuador and far northern Peru.

== Taxonomy and systematics ==
The long-tailed tapaculo was formerly considered a subspecies of rufous-vented tapaculo (Scytalopus femoralis) but was separated based principally on differences in their vocalizations. They are now classed as sister species.

== Description ==
The long-tailed tapaculo is one of the larger species of genus Scytalopus, and, compared to other Scytalopus species, its tail is relatively long. It is 13.5 cm (5.3 in) long overall and males weigh from 27 to 32.5 g (0.95 to 1.15 oz). Otherwise the long-tailed tapaculo has few distinctive morphological features: The male's plumage is drab, primarily dark gray with russet brown flanks that are barred with black. The female is similar but even drabber.

The long-tailed tapaculo's song typically begins with a series of single notes, but quickly turns into a series of couplets . Its alarm call is a descending series.

== Distribution and habitat ==
The long-tailed tapaculo occurs along the east slopes of the Andes from Colombia south to northern Peru. There it inhabits humid shrubby areas along streams and forest edges. In most of its range it is found between 1,250 and 2,300 m (4,100 and 7,550 ft), but in Peru is limited to elevations between 1,650 and 1,950 m (5,410 and 6,400 ft).

== Behavior ==
=== Feeding ===
Like other cloud forest tapaculos, the long-tailed tapaculo forages on or near the ground for small invertebrates.

=== Breeding ===
The long-tailed tapaculo probably breeds in all months. Birds collected in September and November had active gonads, but no other information has been published.

== Status ==
The IUCN has assessed the long-tailed tapaculo as being of Least Concern. Though it has a somewhat restricted range and the population size is not known, both are believed large enough to allow that classification.
