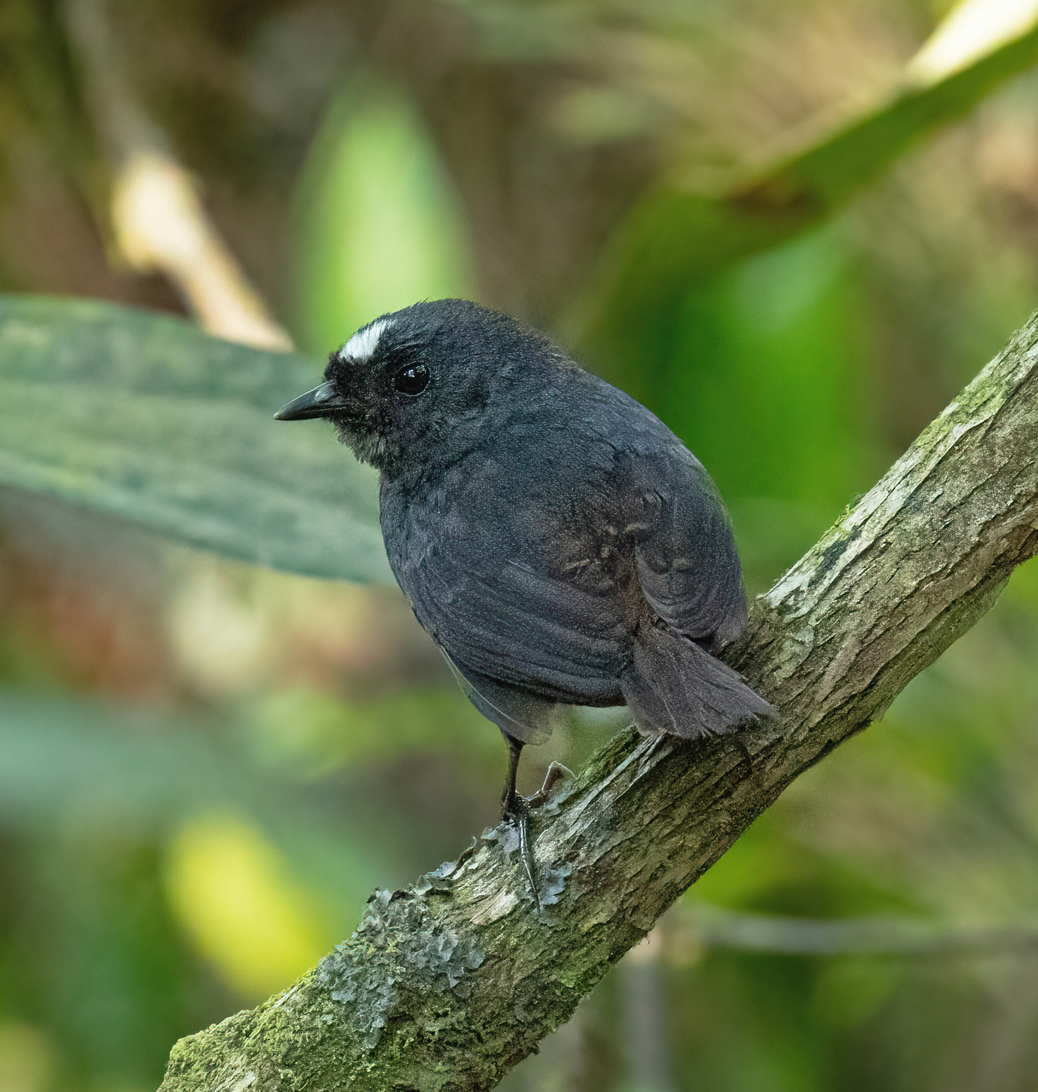

Conservation status
- Least Concern (IUCN 3.1)

Scientific classification
- Kingdom: Animalia
- Phylum: Chordata
- Class: Aves
- Order: Passeriformes
- Family: Rhinocryptidae
- Genus: Scytalopus
- Species: S. bolivianus

Binomial name
- Scytalopus bolivianus Allen, 1889

= Bolivian tapaculo =

Species of bird

The Bolivian tapaculo (Scytalopus bolivianus) is a species of bird in the family Rhinocryptidae. It is found in Bolivia and Peru.

== Taxonomy and systematics ==
The Bolivian tapaculo was formerly considered a subspecies of rufous-vented tapaculo (Scytalopus femoralis) but was separated based principally on differences in their vocalizations.

== Description ==
The Bolivian tapaculo is 12 cm (4.7 in) long. Males weigh 17 to 22 g (0.60 to 0.78 oz) and one female weighed 19.5 g (0.69 oz). The male is mostly dark gray with reddish brown flanks, vent, and crissum (the area around the cloaca). It has a variable amount of white on the crown of the head. The female is paler gray washed with brown above with a black-barred brown belly. The juvenile is similar to the female.

== Distribution and habitat ==
The Bolivian tapaculo is found from Puno Province in southeastern Peru into Bolivia as far as Chuquisaca Department. It inhabits dense undergrowth in humid broadleaf forest. Its primary elevational range is 1,000 to 2,300 m (3,300 to 7,500 ft) but it can be found as high as 2,850 m (9,350 ft) in a few locations.

== Behavior ==
No information is available on the Bolivian tapaculo's feeding or breeding phenologies. Its song is a trill up to 15 seconds long and its alarm call is rendered "kekekeke" . The female is thought to utter a high-pitched "brzk" .

== Status ==
The IUCN has assessed the Bolivian tapaculo as being of Least Concern. Though its population number is not known and is thought to be decreasing, it does not meet the criteria for a more critical rating. It does occur in some national parks and preserves.
