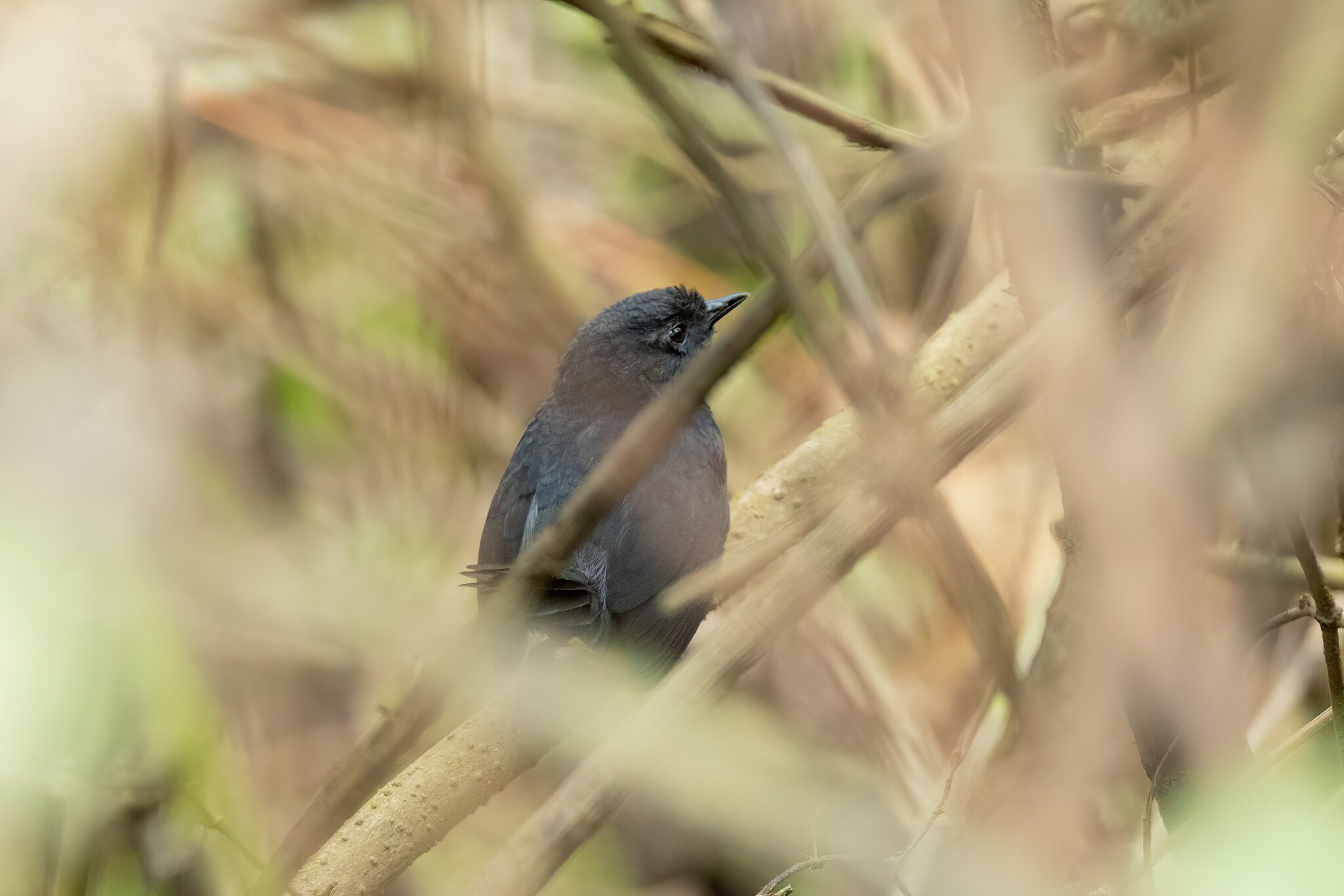

Scientific classification
- Kingdom: Animalia
- Phylum: Chordata
- Class: Aves
- Order: Passeriformes
- Family: Rhinocryptidae
- Genus: Scytalopus
- Species: S. intermedius

Binomial name
- Scytalopus intermedius John T. Zimmer, 1939

= Utcubamba tapaculo =

Species of bird

The Utcubamba tapaculo (Scytalopus intermedius) is a species of bird in the family Rhinocryptidae that the South American Classification Committee of the American Ornithological Society split from blackish tapaculo (S. latrans) in July 2020. It is endemic to Peru.

== Description ==
The Utcubamba tapaculo is small compared to other tapaculos; it is approximately 11 cm (4.3 in) long. Males weigh 16.7 to 22 g (0.59 to 0.78 oz) and females 14 to 20 g (0.49 to 0.71 oz). The male is entirely black. The female is dark gray above and somewhat lighter gray below with little of no brown on the flanks.

== Taxonomy and systematics ==
The Utcubamba tapaculo was originally described as a subspecies of unicolored tapaculo (Scytalopus unicolor). Subsequent splits of two other subspecies retained it as a subspecies of blackish tapaculo. As of January 2021, the International Ornithological Congress (IOC) considers it a distinct species, but the Clements taxonomy retains it as a subspecies of blackish tapaculo (S. latrans intermedius).

== Distribution ==
The Utcubamba tapaculo is endemic to the central Andes of Peru. Most of the records are from the drainage of Río Utcubamba. The range extends from there west to Río Marañón, east to Río Huallaga, and south into San Martín. It is found in elevations from 2,560 to 3,600 m (8,400 to 11,810 ft).

== Status ==
The IUCN has not assessed the Utcubamba tapaculo.
