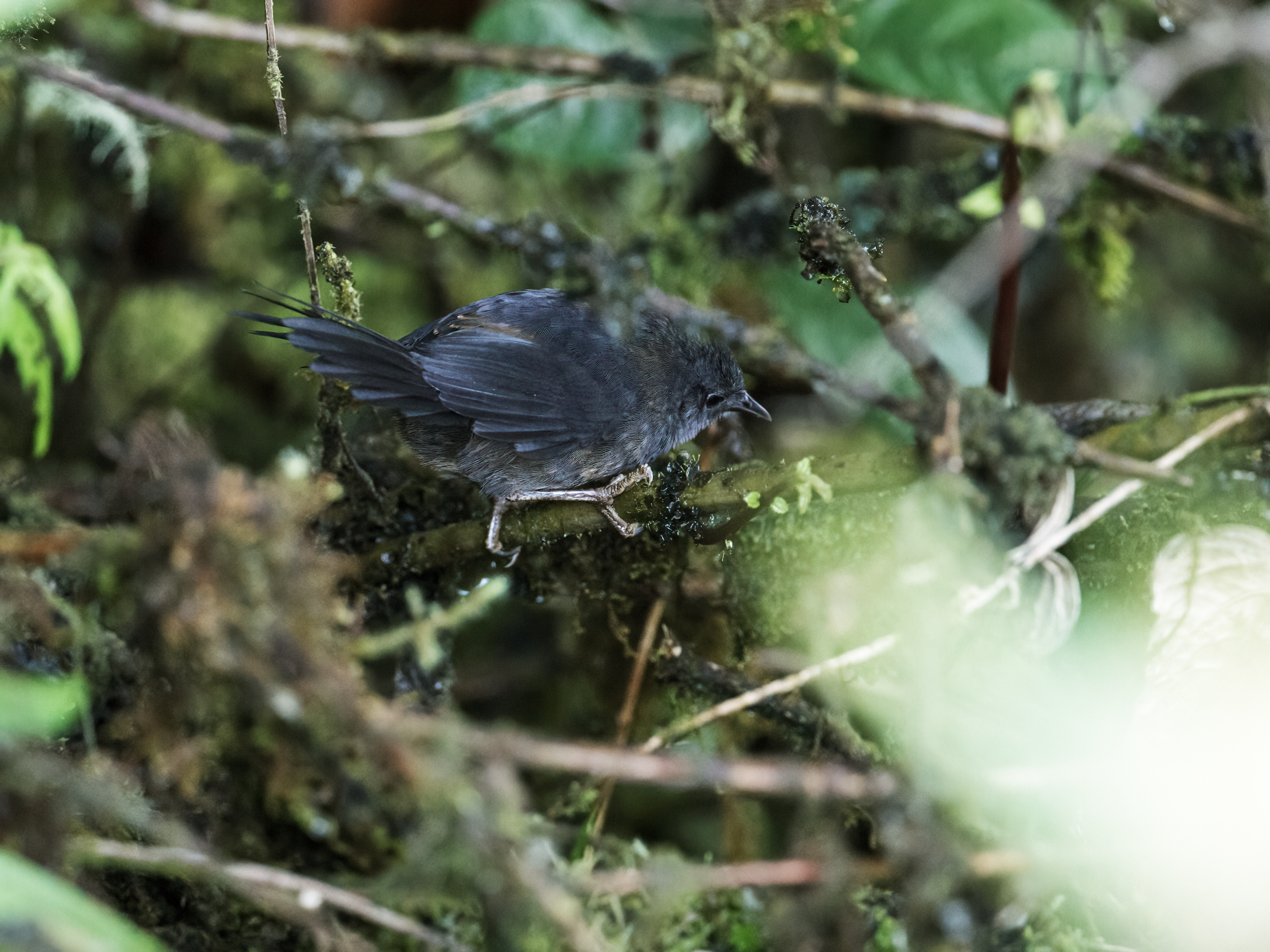

Conservation status
- Least Concern (IUCN 3.1)

Scientific classification
- Kingdom: Animalia
- Phylum: Chordata
- Class: Aves
- Order: Passeriformes
- Family: Rhinocryptidae
- Genus: Myornis; Chapman, 1915
- Species: M. senilis

Binomial name
- Myornis senilis (Lafresnaye, 1840)

= Ash-colored tapaculo =

Species of bird

The ash-colored tapaculo (Myornis senilis) is a species of bird in the family Rhinocryptidae. It is found in Colombia, Ecuador, and Peru.

== Taxonomy and systematics ==
The ash-colored tapaculo is the only member of its genus and has no subspecies. It has sometimes been placed in the large genus Scytalopus.

== Description ==
The ash-colored tapaculo is 14 cm (5.5 in) long. Males weigh 20 to 23.5 g (0.71 to 0.83 oz) and females 18.1 to 24.5 g (0.64 to 0.86 oz). The adult's upper parts are medium gray and the underparts a lighter gray. Some have cinnamon on the flanks and crissum. The juvenile's upper parts are reddish brown and the underparts ochre brown. There are some differences in measurements and the darkness of the plumage between populations on either side of the Andes.

== Distribution and habitate ==
The ash-colored tapaculo is found in all three Andean ranges in Colombia and south through Ecuador to Peru's departments of Huánuco and Pasco. It is a bird of high elevations, inhabiting humid montane forests mostly between 2,300 and 3,700 m (7,500 and 12,100 ft). It is also found as low as 2,000 m (6,600 ft) and locally as high as 3,950 m (12,960 ft). It prefers dense Chusquea bamboo and Neurolepis cane thickets in the forest or forest margins.

== Behavior ==
=== Feeding ===
The ash-colored tapaculo's diet has not been studied. It is known to forage from near the ground up to 4 m (13 ft) above it in the bamboo and cane; it seldom forages on the ground.

=== Breeding ===
Very little is known about the ash-colored tapaculo's breeding phenology. Fledglings have been noted in June in Ecuador and in August in Peru.

=== Vocalization ===
The ash-colored tapaculo's song is complex. It begins with "tick" repeated irregularly for up to a minute, followed by a three to four second trill described as "hysterical laughter" which is then often repeated . The alarm call is a dry trill.

== Status ==
The IUCN has assessed the ash-colored tapaculo as being of Least Concern. It occupies a large range and the population appears to be stable though its number is not known. It occurs in protected areas in Ecuador.
