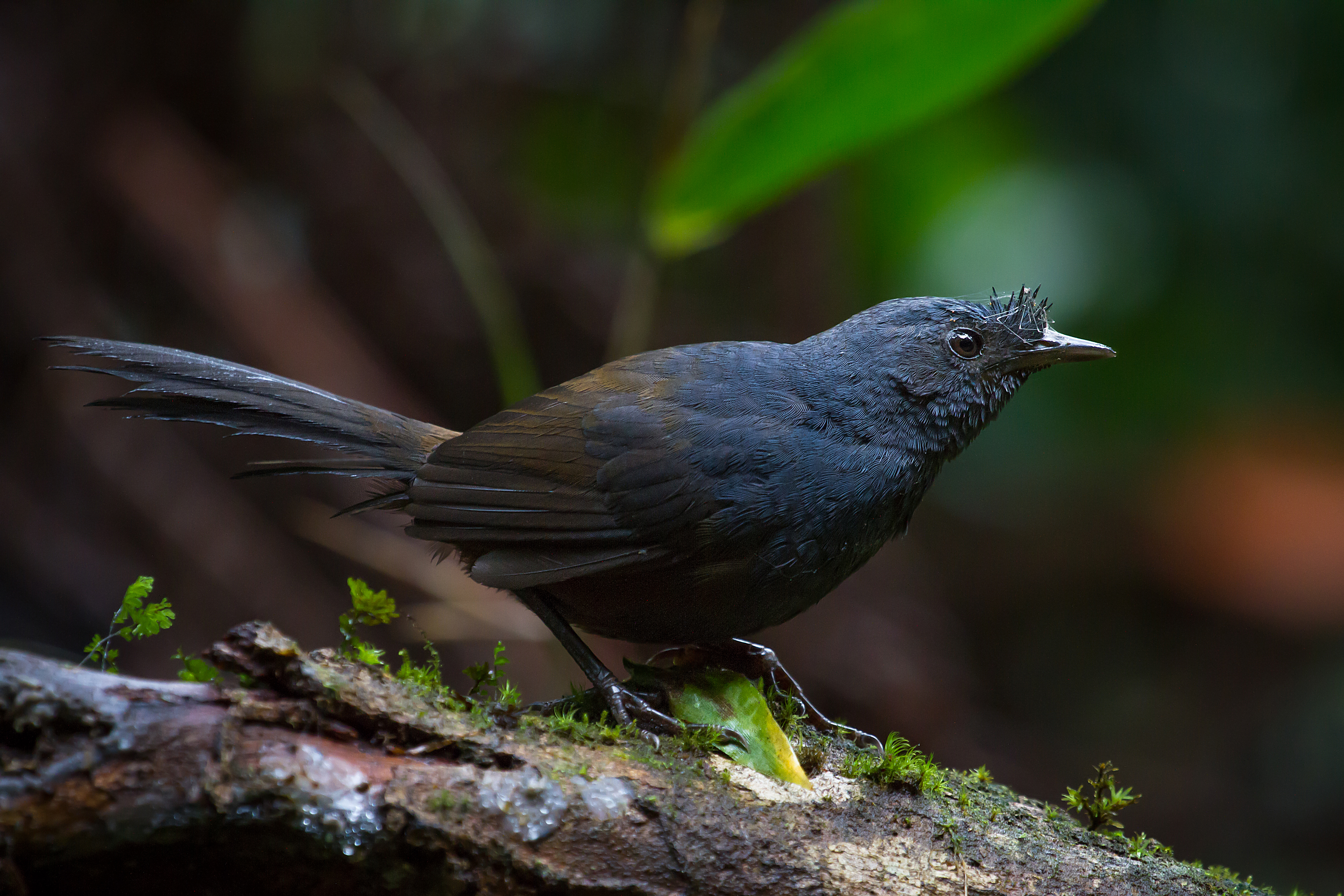
- Male
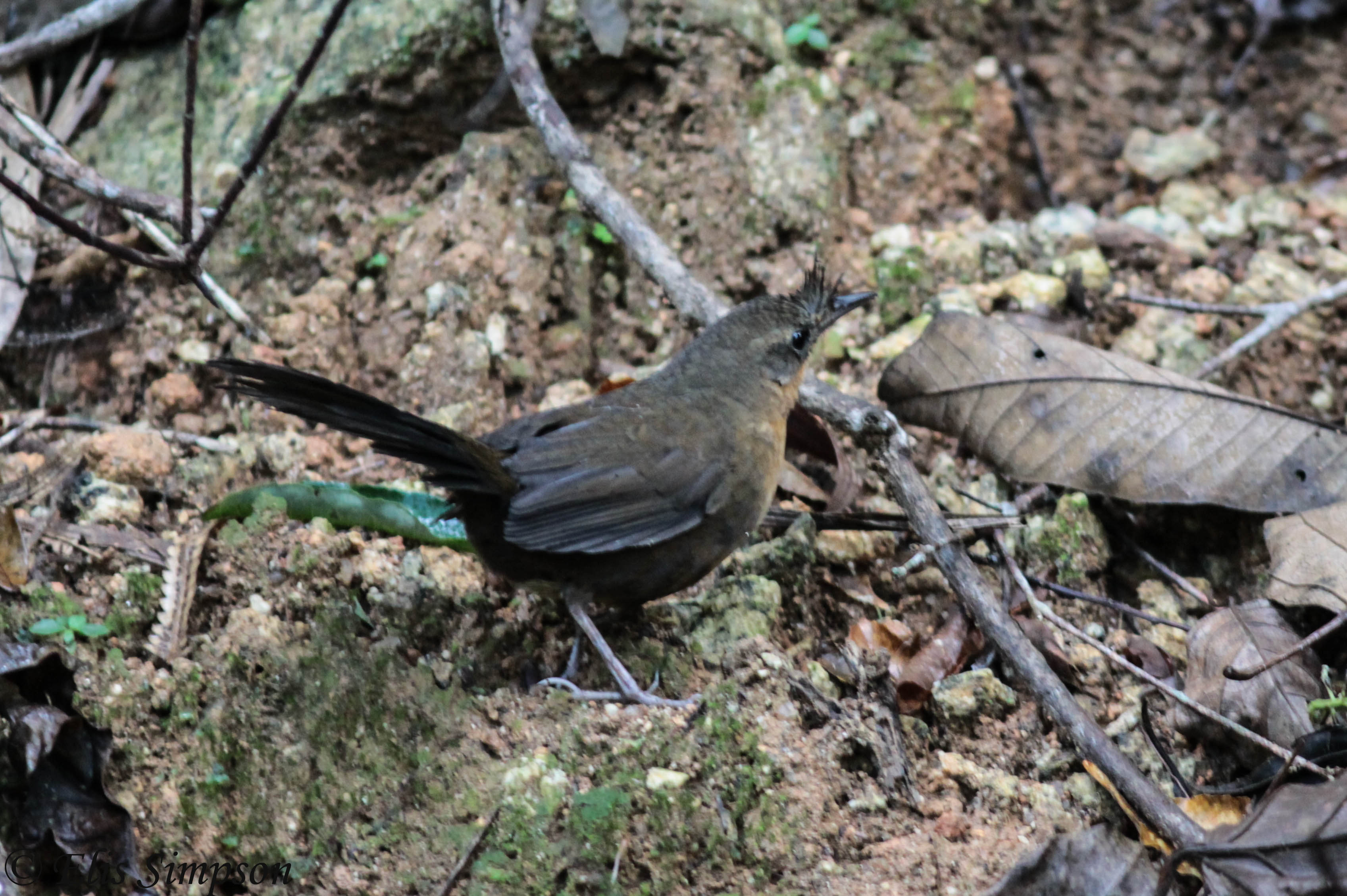
- Female

Conservation status
- Least Concern (IUCN 3.1)

Scientific classification
- Kingdom: Animalia
- Phylum: Chordata
- Class: Aves
- Order: Passeriformes
- Family: Rhinocryptidae
- Genus: Merulaxis
- Species: M. ater

Binomial name
- Merulaxis ater Lesson, 1831

= Slaty bristlefront =

Species of bird in Brazil

The slaty bristlefront (Merulaxis ater) is a member of the Neotropical bird family Rhinocryptidae, the tapaculos. It is endemic to south-east Brazil.

== Taxonomy and systematics ==
The slaty bristlefront and Stresemann's bristlefront (Merulaxis stresemanni) form a superspecies, and the two might actually be one species. It has no subspecies.

== Description ==
The slaty bristlefront is 18.5 cm (7.3 in) long. A male weighed 37.2 g (1.31 oz) and a female 33 g (1.2 oz). The male is mostly dark blue gray. The lower back is dark brown and the flanks, vent, and tail are black. The female is over all shades of brown, lighter on the throat and breast. Both sexes have a crest of short stiff feathers that stand erect at the base of the bill and forehead.

== Distribution and habitat ==
The slaty bristlefront is found only in southeastern Brazil, in a narrow band near the Atlantic coast from Espírito Santo south to Santa Catarina. It might have formerly occurred further north in southern Bahia.

The slaty bristlefront is a bird of humid forests in both lowlands and mountains. In a few locations it is found at elevations as low as 100 m (330 ft) but more typically its lower limit is 400 m (1,300 ft). In the northern part of its range it is found only in the mountains, as high as 1,800 m (5,900 ft).

== Behavior ==
=== Feeding ===
Little is known about the slaty bristlefront's diet. It is known to forage in pairs, though not close together, on the ground and in low vegetation.

=== Breeding ===
One slaty bristlefront nest has been described, in Rio de Janeiro state. It was constructed by both members of a pair using twigs, narrow leaves, and leaf stems with a lining of lichen. It was placed in a roughly horizontal burrow at least 1.24 m (4.1 ft) long in an earthen bank.

=== Vocalization ===
The slaty bristlefront begins its song with a series of clicks followed by a trill described as "hysterical laughter". It has several calls, described as "tsewk-tsewk, pit", "keekick", and "he-he-heeheeheehee".

== Status ==
The IUCN has assessed the slaty bristlefront as least concern. It is threatened by habitat loss, especially in the lowlands.
