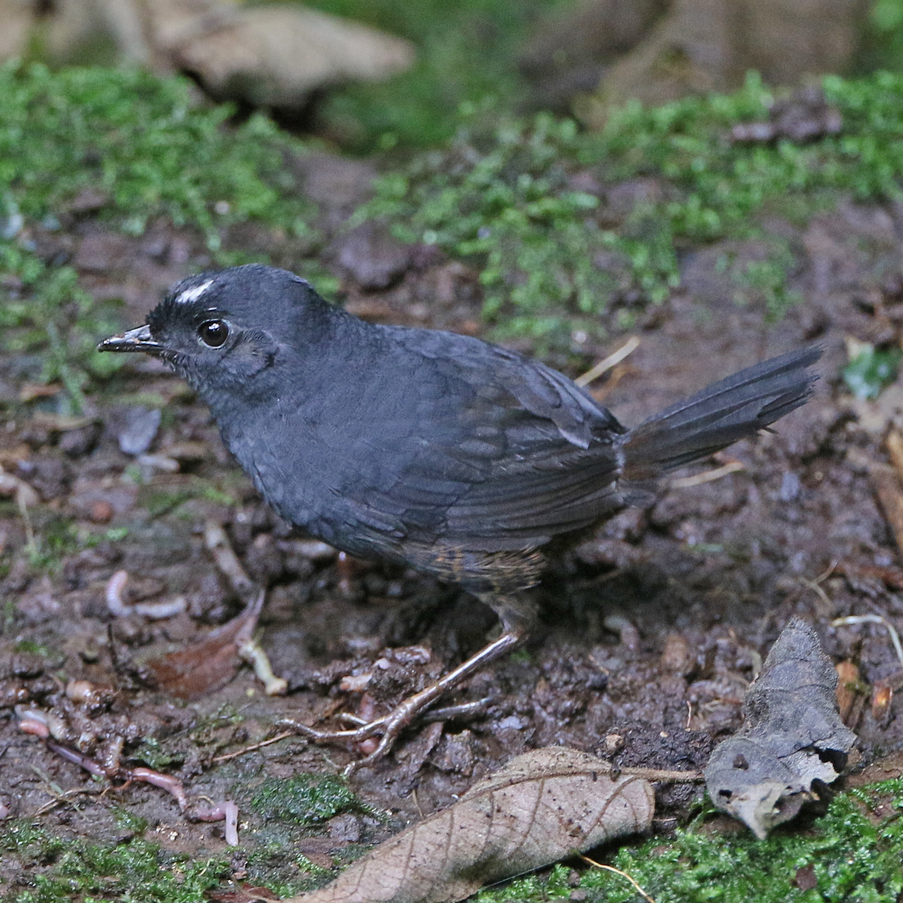

Conservation status
- Least Concern (IUCN 3.1)

Scientific classification
- Kingdom: Animalia
- Phylum: Chordata
- Class: Aves
- Order: Passeriformes
- Family: Rhinocryptidae
- Genus: Scytalopus
- Species: S. atratus

Binomial name
- Scytalopus atratus Hellmayr, 1922

Audio
- Song of white-crowned tapaculo in Napo Province, Ecuador

= White-crowned tapaculo =

Species of bird

The white-crowned tapaculo (Scytalopus atratus) is a species of bird in the family Rhinocryptidae. It is found in Bolivia, Colombia, Ecuador, Peru, and Venezuela.

== Taxonomy and systematics ==
The white-crowned tapaculo was formerly considered a subspecies of rufous-vented tapaculo (Scytalopus femoralis) but was separated based principally on differences in their vocalizations.

Three subspecies of northern white-crowned tapaculo are recognized, the nominate Scytalopus atratus atratus, S. a. nigricans, and S. a. confusus. However, the vocalizations of birds of the eastern Andes (S. a. atratus in part) differ from those in the west, "suggesting that [they] are a separate species".

== Description ==
The white-crowned tapaculo is 12 cm (4.7 in) long. Males weigh 24.6 to 32.5 g (0.87 to 1.15 oz) and one female weighed 25.3 g (0.89 oz). The male of the nominate subspecies is mostly blackish above and slightly lighter below. The flanks and vent are reddish brown and have black bars. It has a white patch on the crown of the head. The female is paler than the male and washed with brown above and is more reddish on the flanks. The juvenile is rust colored with heavy barring. The male S. a. nigricans is darker than the nominate and the female is gray underneath. The male S. a. confusus is paler than the nominate (slaty black) with a brownish lower back. The reddish brown on the flanks and vent, however, covers more area and has heavier barring.

== Distribution and habitat ==
The white-crowned tapaculo is found from western Venezuela to central Peru. Subspecies S. a. nigricans is found only in Venezuela, in Sierra de Perijá and the southern slope of the Andes in Táchira and Mérida states. S. a. confusus is found in the central and western Andes of Colombia. S. a. atratus is the most widespread. As it is currently defined, it ranges from the eastern Andes of Colombia and Ecuador to the central Andes of Peru as far south as the Department of Cuzco.

The white-crowned tapaculo inhabits the undergrowth in the interior and edges of humid montane forest. It ranges in elevation from 850 to 1,900 m (2,790 to 6,230 ft).

== Behavior ==
=== Feeding ===
The white-crowned tapaculo forages on and near the ground for insects.

=== Breeding ===
Almost nothing is known about the white-crowned tapaculo's breeding phenology. A juvenile was collected in January and an adult with enlarged gonads in November, both in Ecuador. The species is known to be territorial year round.

=== Vocalization ===
The songs of different populations of white-crowned tapaculos are highly variable. Some examples include this from near Bogotá, Colombia , this from near La Florida, Department of Amazonas, Peru , and this from Mérida, Venezuela .

== Status ==
The IUCN has assessed the white-crowned tapaculo as being of Least Concern. The species has a large range, and although the population has not been quantified, it is believed to be stable.
