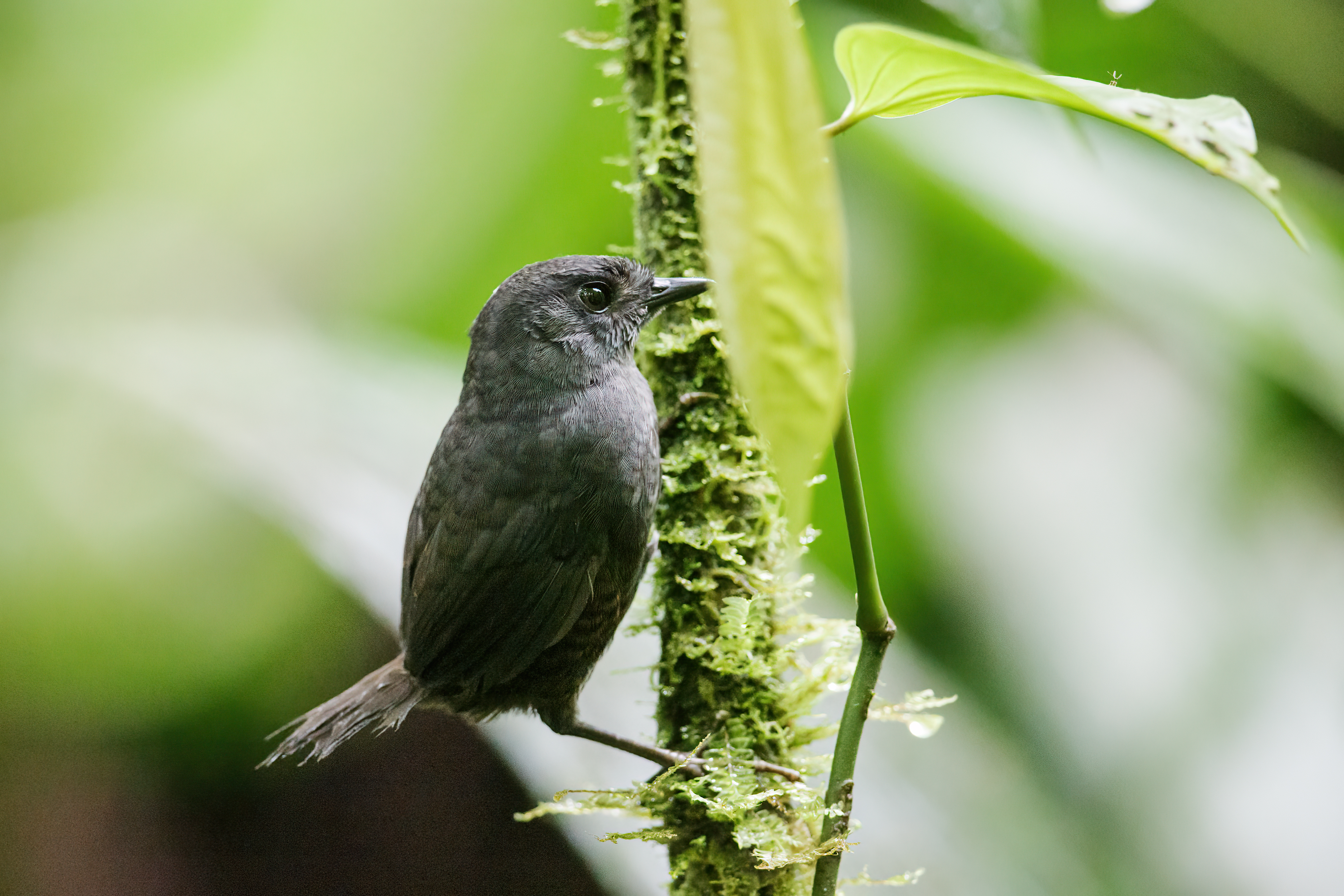

Conservation status
- Least Concern (IUCN 3.1)

Scientific classification
- Kingdom: Animalia
- Phylum: Chordata
- Class: Aves
- Order: Passeriformes
- Family: Rhinocryptidae
- Genus: Scytalopus
- Species: S. chocoensis

Binomial name
- Scytalopus chocoensis Krabbe & Schulenberg, 1997

= Chocó tapaculo =

Species of bird

The Chocó tapaculo (Scytalopus chocoensis) is a species of bird in the family Rhinocryptidae. It is found in Colombia, Ecuador, and Panama.

== Taxonomy and systematics ==
The Chocó tapaculo was formerly considered a subspecies of the Nariño tapaculo (Scytalopus vicinior) but was elevated to species status following Krabbe and Schulenberg (1997).

== Description ==
The Chocó tapaculo is 11 cm (4.3 in) long. Males weigh 19 to 22.5 g (0.67 to 0.79 oz) and females 17 to 20.1 g (0.60 to 0.71 oz). The male's mantle is dark gray, its lower back gray with a brown wash, and the rump dark brown with dusky bars. It is lighter gray below to the lower belly, which is reddish-brown with dark bars. The female is similar but the brownish wash extends to the head. The throat is lighter gray than the upper breast; the lower belly sometimes has a yellowish wash. The juvenile's upper parts are drab brown but for the dark brown rump; it appears barred below.

== Distribution and habitat ==
The Chocó tapaculo is found in two small areas on the Pacific slope of eastern Panama and separately in a narrow band from western Colombia south into northwestern Ecuador. It principally inhabits the dense understory of humid primary forest but is also found at forest edges. In Panama it ranges in elevation from 1,340 to 1,465 m (4,396 to 4,806 ft) and in Colombia and Ecuador from 250 to 1,250 m (820 to 4,100 ft).

== Behavior ==
=== Feeding ===
Little is known beyond that the Chocó tapaculo forages on the ground for insects.

=== Breeding ===
A female with active gonads was captured in February; nests with juveniles were found in August. A nest was described as a ball of rootlets and moss 12 cm (4.7 in) in diameter hidden in leaf litter. It contained nestlings that were being fed by both adults.

=== Vocalization ===
The Chocó tapaculo's song is "a very resonant series 5-60 seconds long...the first few notes often slightly lower-pitched and delivered at a faster rate" . The call is a series of short sharp notes .

== Status ==
The IUCN has assessed the Chocó tapaculo as being of Least Concern. Despite its somewhat small range and unknown population numbers, both are believed large enough to warrant that classification.
