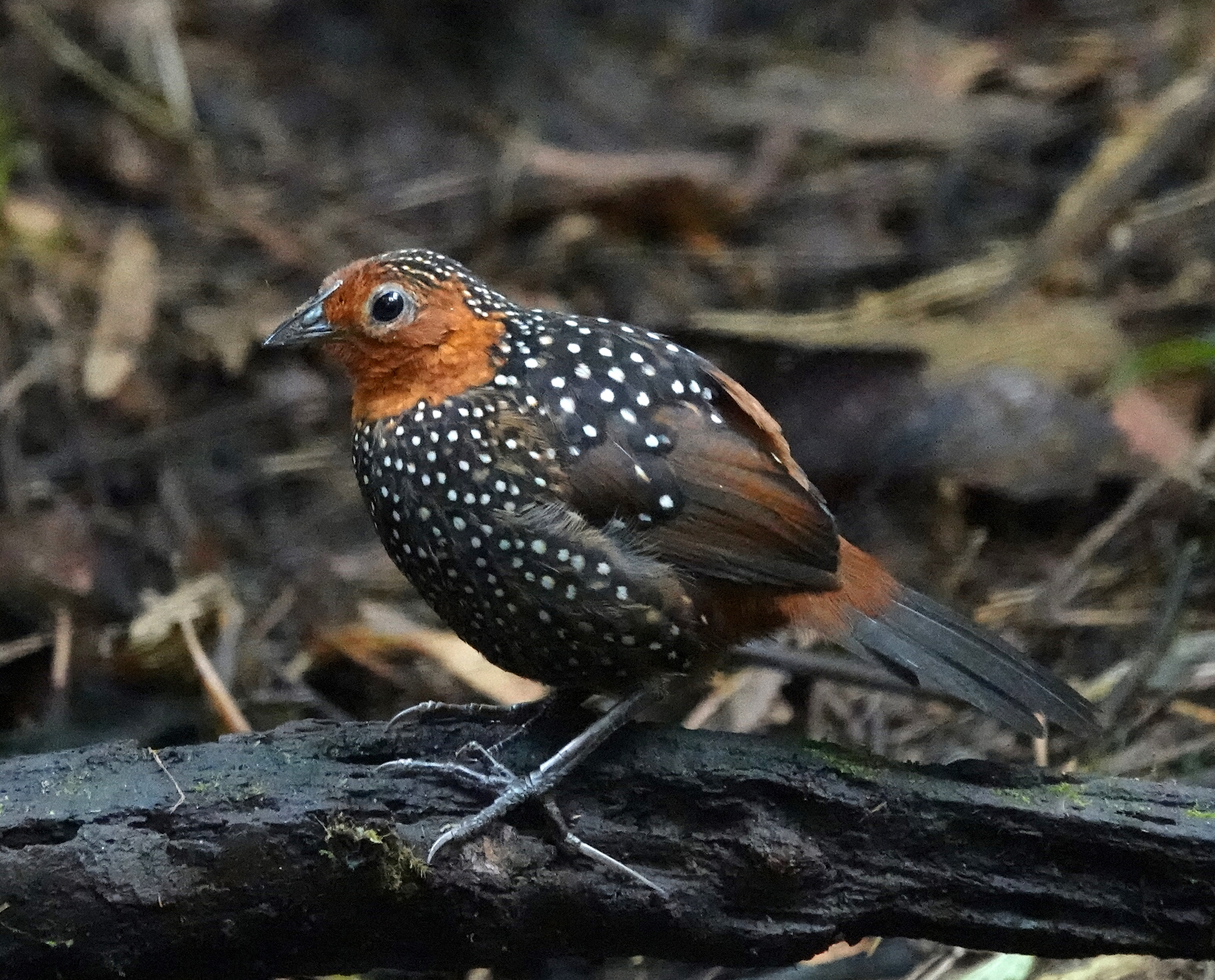
- Photographed in Colombia

Conservation status
- Least Concern (IUCN 3.1)

Scientific classification
- Kingdom: Animalia
- Phylum: Chordata
- Class: Aves
- Order: Passeriformes
- Family: Rhinocryptidae
- Genus: Acropternis; Cabanis & Heine, 1860
- Species: A. orthonyx

Binomial name
- Acropternis orthonyx (Lafresnaye, 1843)

= Ocellated tapaculo =

Species of bird

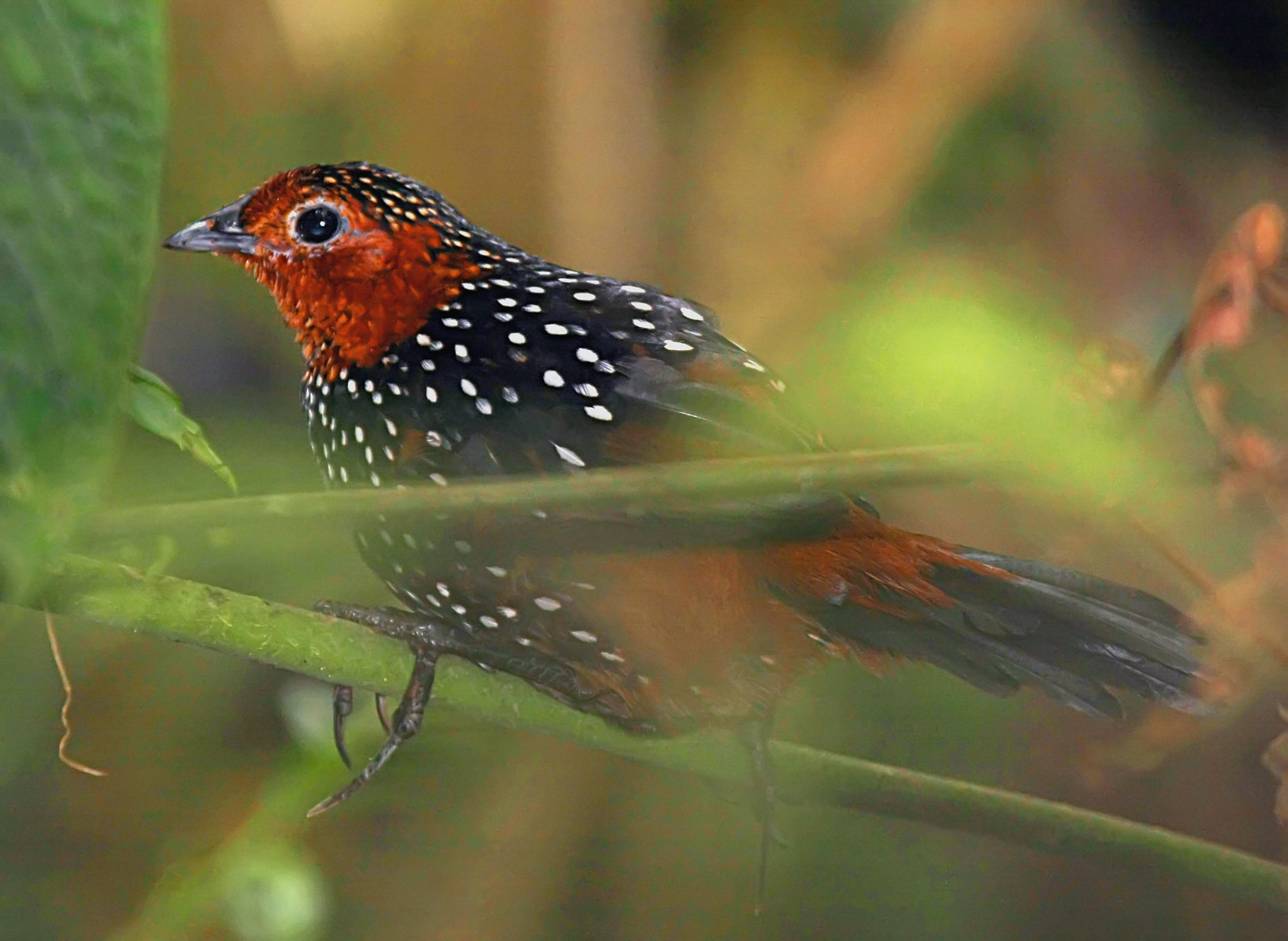
Photographed in Ecuador

The ocellated tapaculo (Acropternis orthonyx) is a large bird found in the northern Andes in South America. It is a highly distinctive tapaculo; traditionally united with its closest relatives in the Rhinocryptidae, this family is paraphyletic with the Formicariidae (ground-antbirds) but instead of merging the tapaculos with the ground-antbird family, recent sources tend to split the antpittas from the Formicariidae.

== Description ==
This passerine averages 8.3-8.7 in (21–22 cm) in length and between 2.8 and 3.5 oz (80 and 100 gram). The bird is mostly black with large white spots, a brown flank, and a reddish head and throat. A call, apparently given by birds to announce their presence to conspecifics, is described as "loud, emphatic WHEEUW! whistle" which as it seems can be heard from a long distance.

It is usually encountered in pairs or alone, hopping through bamboo along the forest floor. Preferring to stay close to the ground, it is more often heard than seen. It is possible to attract ocellated tapaculos with recorded or imitated calls, which they will approach to investigate from several kilometers away.

== Ecology ==
=== Distribution ===
It is sometimes divided into two subspecies: Acropternis orthonyx infuscatus is found in the mountains of Ecuador and northern Peru. The nominate subspecies A. o. orthonyx ranges further north, from the Cordillera Central and Cordillera Oriental of Colombia to the mountains of northwestern Venezuela, with small populations also present in the Cordillera Occidental (in Antioquia and the Páramo de Frontino at least). It is not usually found on the Amazonian slope of the East Colombian and Venezuelan mountains it inhabits; on the Cordillera Oriental it is only known so far in a few places between 8,200 and 10,000 ft (2,500-3,000 m) ASL. The northern and southern populations are barely distinguishable and many authors accept no subspecies at all.

=== Habitat ===
It favors humid and rather low-growing forest with canopy heights of about 50–80 ft (15–25 m). Dominant trees can include for example Brunellia, Hieronyma rufa (Phyllanthaceae), Ocotea calophylla (Lauraceae), oaks (Quercus), glorytrees (Tibouchina) and Weinmannia, usually heavily overgrown with epiphytes. More important is the presence of a tangled understory with abundant stands of South American mountain bamboo (Chusquea), forming an impenetrable thicket together with other plants such as Geonoma weberbaueri palms or Ericaceae shrubs. Due to its dependence on bamboo thickets which only grow in clearings it seems to tolerate selective logging well and may actually benefit from it.

=== Diet ===
The ocellated tapaculo eats plant material and arthropods, which it digs up using both feet simultaneously.

== Status ==
Though shy and retiring and affected by habitat destruction like all forest birds of the tropical Americas, it is common enough to be considered a Species of least concern by the IUCN.
