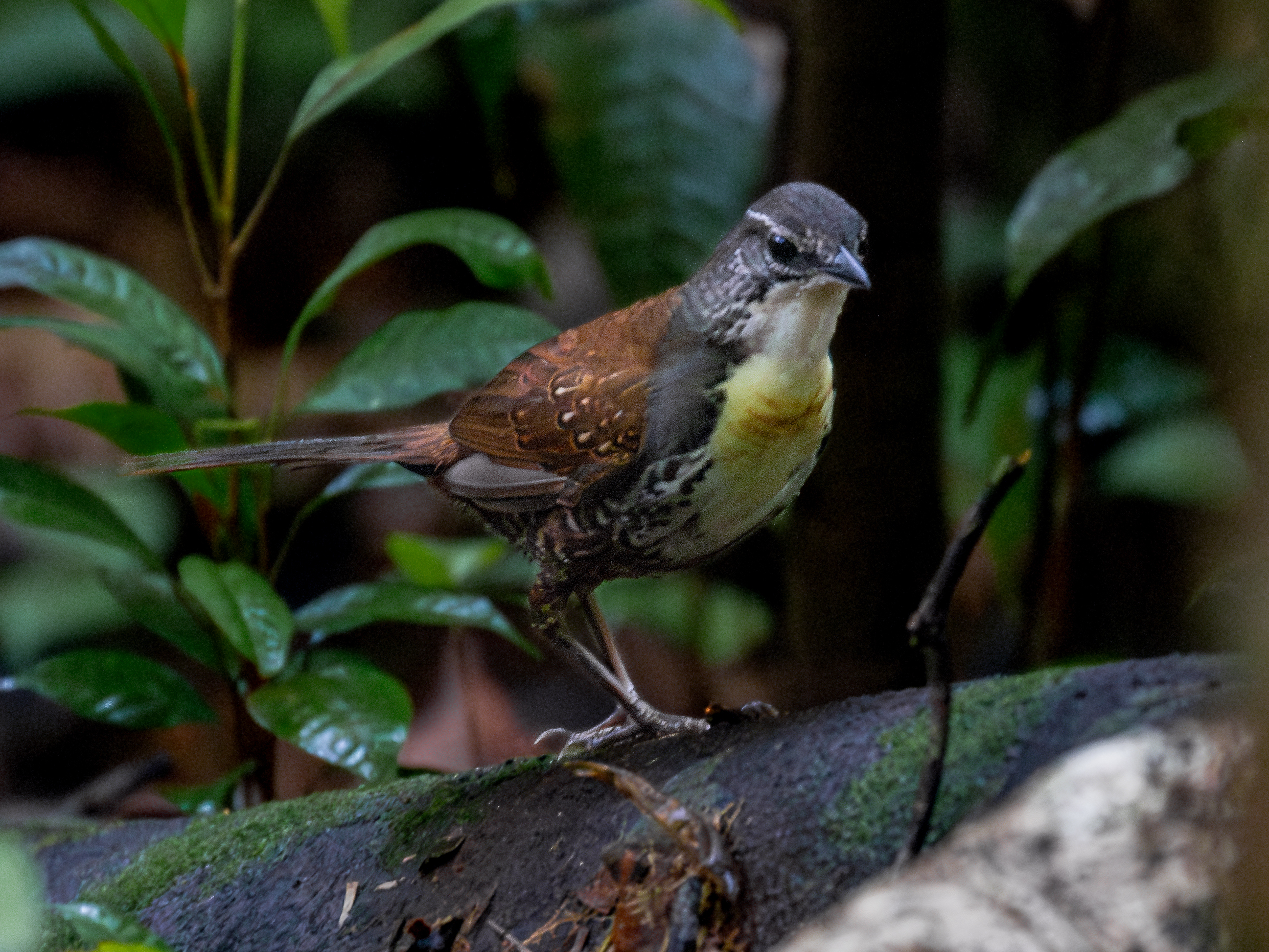
- Liosceles thoracicus thoracicus, Pará, Brazil

Conservation status
- Least Concern (IUCN 3.1)

Scientific classification
- Kingdom: Animalia
- Phylum: Chordata
- Class: Aves
- Order: Passeriformes
- Family: Rhinocryptidae
- Genus: Liosceles; P.L. Sclater, 1865
- Species: L. thoracicus

Binomial name
- Liosceles thoracicus (P.L. Sclater, 1865)

Synonyms
- Pteroptochus thoracicus P. L. Sclater, 1865

= Rusty-belted tapaculo =

Species of bird

The rusty-belted tapaculo (Liosceles thoracicus) is a species of suboscine passerine bird in the tapaculo family Rhinocryptidae. It is the only species placed in the genus Liosceles. It is found in Brazil, Bolivia, Colombia, Ecuador, and Peru.

== Taxonomy ==
The rusty-belted tapaculo is the only species in its genus; the genus and species were first described by Philip Lutley Sclater in 1865. Three subspecies are recognized: the nominate Liosceles thoracicus thoracicus, L. t. dugandi, and L. t. erithacus.

The rusty-belted tapaculo is genetically most closely related to the spotted bamboowren (Psilorhamphus guttatus).

== Description ==
The rusty-belted tapaculo is 19.5 cm (7.7 in) long and weighs 39 to 42 g (1.4 to 1.5 oz). Its plumage is unlike that of any other tapaculo. The nominate subspecies has a grayish brown head with a white supercilium and a reddish brown back, wings, and rump. The throat is white with black streaks at the side, most of the breast is white, and the flanks and vent are barred with black, brown, and white. The upper breast has a yellow to orange brown band the gives the species its common name. Subspecies L. t. erithacus is browner on the head and the breast band is larger and darker. Subspecies L. t. dugandi is also similar to the nominate, but the breast band is rufous and extends into the neck and throat.

The rusty-belted tapaculo vocalizes from the ground or low branches. Its song is an "easily imitated whistled note...repeated at intervals...[ending in a] descending series" . Its call is described as a repeated cree or "cree-cree".

== Distribution and habitat ==
The nominate subspecies of the rusty-belted tapaculo is found in west and central Amazonian Brazil, and is believed to be the race found in southeastern Peru and northern Bolivia. Subspecies L. t. dugandi inhabits southeastern Colombia and adjacent western Brazil. Subspecies L. t. erithacus is found in eastern Ecuador and eastern Peru.

The rusty-belted tapaculo is the only member of its family to inhabit the Amazonian rainforest. It is primarily found in humid terra firme forest, whose ground is dry year-round, but also inhabits várzea, which is seasonally flooded. It ranges generally up to 600 m (2,000 ft) elevation, in some places to 900 m (3,000 ft), and in Peru up to 1,000 m (3,300 ft).

== Behavior ==
=== Feeding ===
The rusty-belted tapaculo's primary prey is terrestrial true bugs, Hemiptera. It forages by walking and hopping on the forest floor, picking the bugs from atop the litter, and also feeds along fallen tree trunks.

=== Breeding ===
Very little is known about the rusty-belted tapaculo's breeding phenology. Only one nest has been found; it was spherical, made of twigs, grass, and other materials, and on the ground among the roots of a small tree.

== Status ==
The IUCN has assessed the rusty-belted tapaculo as being of Least Concern. Its population, though of unknown size, is believed to be fairly large and stable. It is found in several large protected areas.
