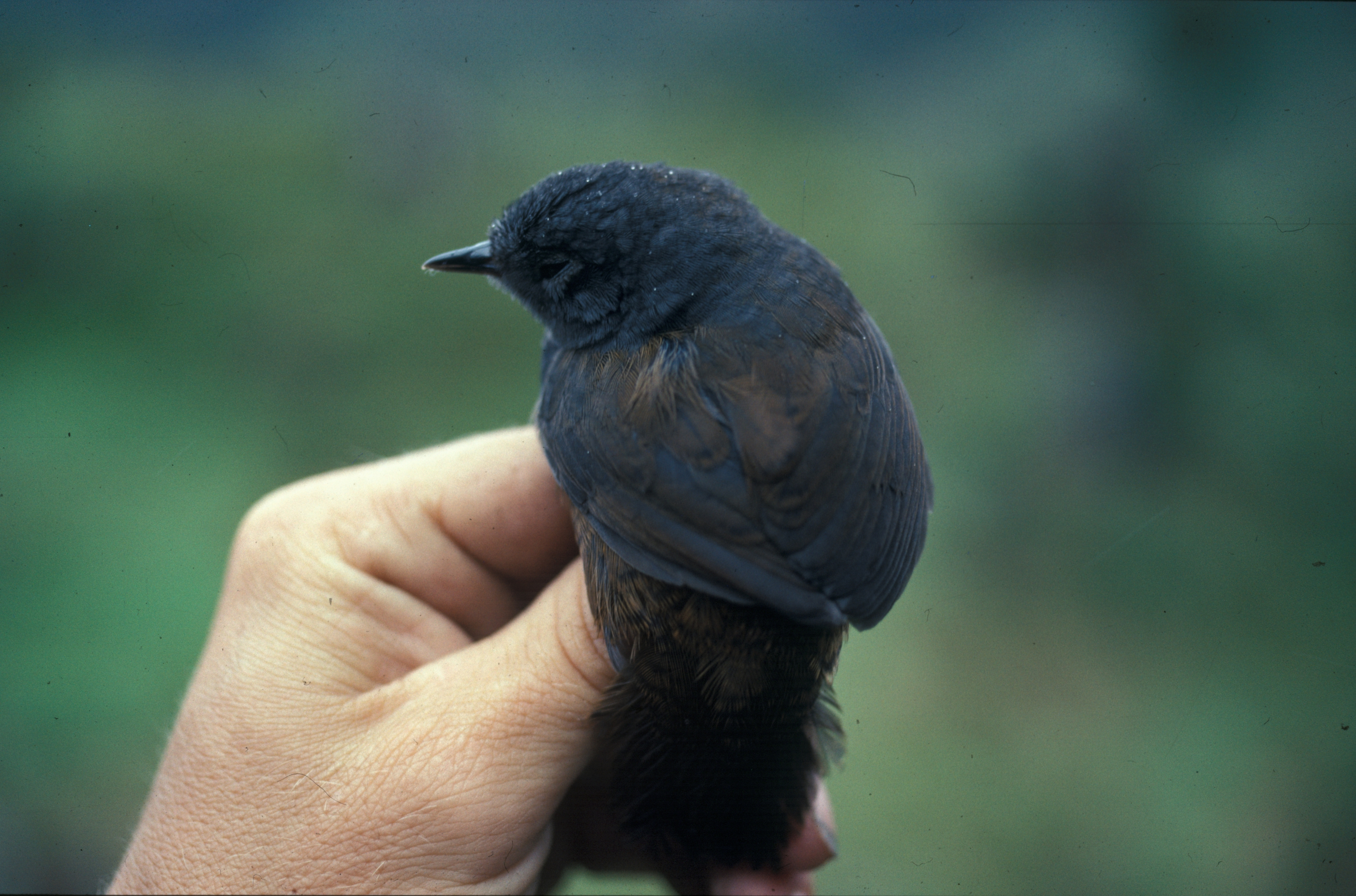

Conservation status
- Least Concern (IUCN 3.1)

Scientific classification
- Kingdom: Animalia
- Phylum: Chordata
- Class: Aves
- Order: Passeriformes
- Family: Rhinocryptidae
- Genus: Scytalopus
- Species: S. latrans

Binomial name
- Scytalopus latrans Hellmayr, 1924

Audio

= Blackish tapaculo =

Species of bird

The blackish tapaculo (Scytalopus latrans) is a species of bird in the family Rhinocryptidae. It is found in Colombia, Ecuador, Peru, and Venezuela.

== Taxonomy and systematics ==
The blackish tapaculo was originally described by Hellmayr as a species. Later it was reclassified as a subspecies of unicolored tapaculo (Scytalopus unicolor) and later still returned to full species status. There are two subspecies, the "blackish" S. l. latrans and the "Pacific" S. l. subcinereus. The latter is sometimes considered to be a separate species. The former "Peruvian" subspecies S. l. intermedius has been elevated to species status as Utcubamba tapaculo by the International Ornithological Congress (IOC).

== Description ==
The blackish tapaculo is approximately 11 cm (4.3 in) long. Males weigh 16 to 21 g (0.56 to 0.74 oz) and females 14 to 20 g (0.49 to 0.71 oz). The male of the "blackish" subspecies is dark to very dark gray and the female is dark gray, sometimes with an olive wash. The juvenile is not well known but is believed to be dull brown. The "Pacific" subspecies male is black while the female is gray, darker above and lighter below, with brown flanks. The juvenile is brown.

== Distribution and habitat ==
The "blackish" subspecies of blackish tapaculo inhabits both slopes and interior ranges of the Andes from western Venezuela through Colombia and Ecuador to northern Peru. The "Pacific" subspecies inhabits the western slope of the Andes of southwest Ecuador and northwest Peru. The species is believed to be sedentary.

The blackish tapaculo is found in the understory of moist montane forest at elevations between 1,500 and 4,000 m (4,900 and 13,100 ft). Typical vegetative associations include Chusquea bamboo and Polylepis scrub. It also inhabits other shrubs, swampy areas, and second growth.

== Behavior ==
=== Feeding ===
The blackish tapaculo feeds on and near the ground, gleaning soil, moss, foliage, and stems for small arthropods.

=== Breeding ===
Very little is known about the blackish tapaculo's breeding phenology. The one known nest was globular and in an earthen bank covered with clubmoss and ferns.

== Status ==
The IUCN has rated the blackish tapaculo as of Least Concern.
