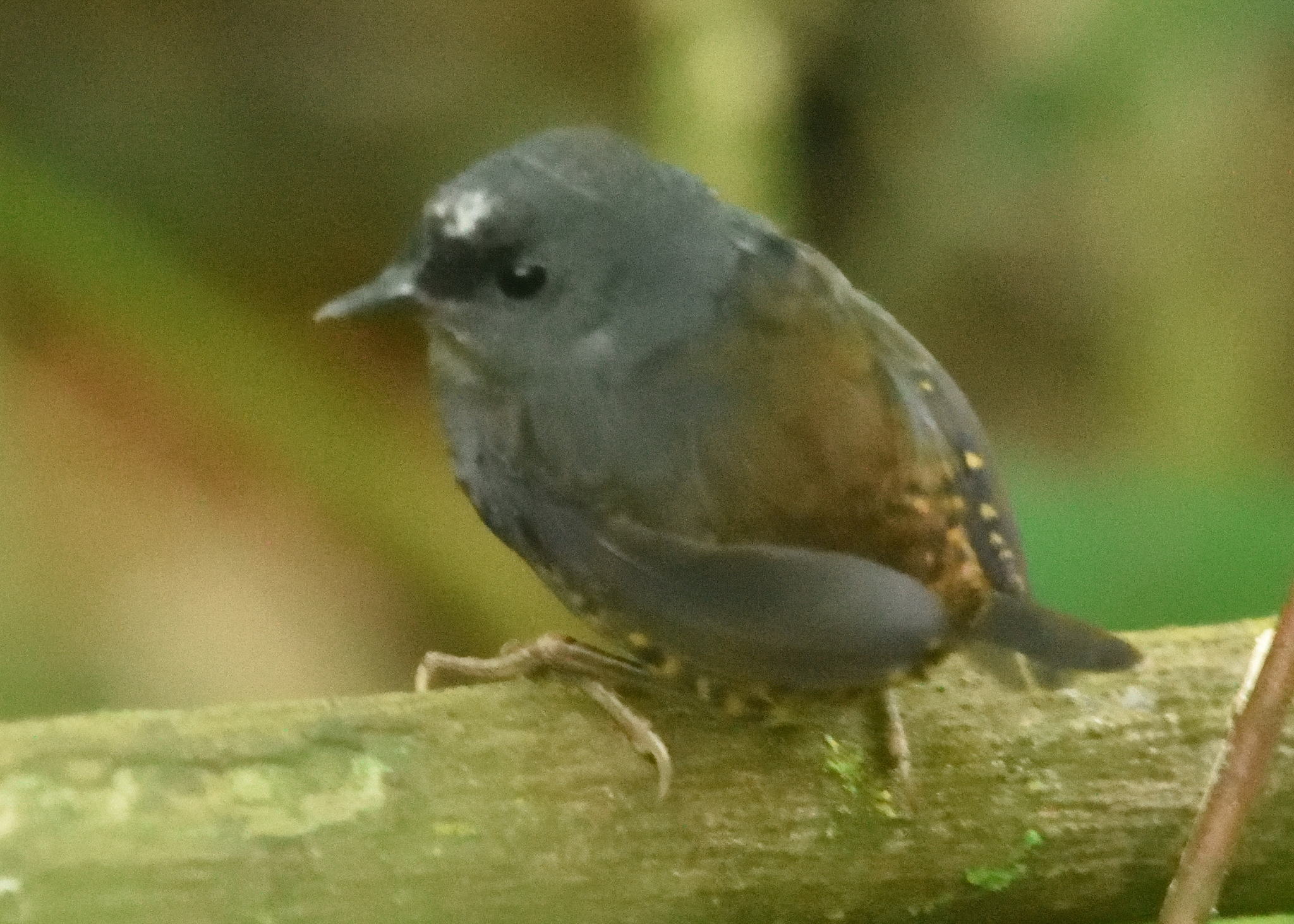

Conservation status
- Near Threatened (IUCN 3.1)

Scientific classification
- Kingdom: Animalia
- Phylum: Chordata
- Class: Aves
- Order: Passeriformes
- Family: Rhinocryptidae
- Genus: Scytalopus
- Species: S. sanctaemartae

Binomial name
- Scytalopus sanctaemartae Chapman, 1915

= Santa Marta tapaculo =

Species of bird

The Santa Marta tapaculo (Scytalopus sanctaemartae) is a species of bird in the family Rhinocryptidae. It is endemic to the Sierra Nevada de Santa Marta of Colombia.

== Taxonomy and systematics ==
The Santa Marta tapaculo was previously considered to be a subspecies of the rufous-vented tapaculo (Scytalopus femoralis). It was raised to species status primarily because of differences in their vocalizations.

== Description ==
The Santa Marta tapaculo is 11 cm (4.3 in) long. The male's head and back are medium gray and the throat and breast a paler gray. It has a white patch on the crown of the head. Its rump is tawny with black bars and the flanks and crissum (the area around the cloaca) are rusty, also with black bars. The female's upper parts have a brown wash and is paler than the male below. The white crown patch is small or absent. The juvenile has heavy bars and scaling.

== Distribution and habitat ==
The Santa Marta tapaculo is found only in the isolated Sierra Nevada de Santa Marta of northeast Colombia. There it inhabits the dense undergrowth of humid montane forest at elevations between 900 and 1,700 m (3,000 and 5,600 ft).

== Behavior ==
The Santa Marta tapaculo is terrestrial like most tapaculos, but no further information about its diet or foraging habits has been reported. The only information about its breeding phenology is that a juvenile was collected in July. Its song is a rapid trill up to 15 seconds long . Its call is a repeated sharp squeak .

== Status ==
The IUCN has assessed the Santa Marta tapaculo as being near threatened. Though it has a relatively restricted range and the population number has not been determined, both are believed to be large enough to warrant that rating.
