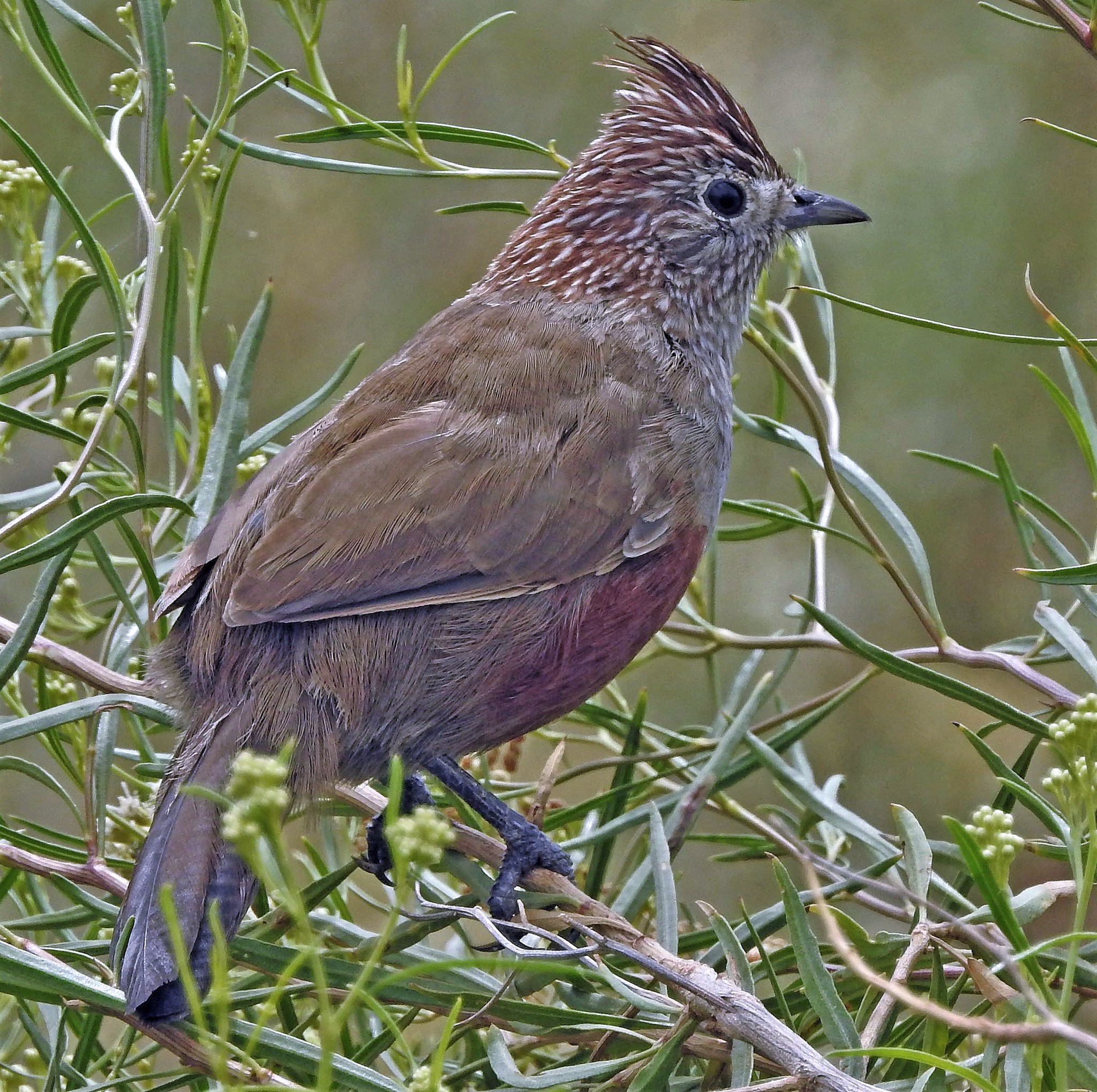

Conservation status
- Least Concern (IUCN 3.1)

Scientific classification
- Kingdom: Animalia
- Phylum: Chordata
- Class: Aves
- Order: Passeriformes
- Family: Rhinocryptidae
- Genus: Rhinocrypta; G.R. Gray, 1841
- Species: R. lanceolata

Binomial name
- Rhinocrypta lanceolata (Geoffroy Saint-Hilaire, I, 1832)

= Crested gallito =

Species of bird

The crested gallito (Rhinocrypta lanceolata) is a species of suboscine passerine bird in the tapaculo family Rhinocryptidae. It is the only species placed in the genus Rhinocrypta. It is found in Argentina, Bolivia, and Paraguay.

== Taxonomy ==
The crested gallito is the only species in its genus. Two subspecies are recognized, the nominate Rhinocrypta lanceolata lanceolata and R. l. saturata, which was described in 1939. The crested gallito is genetically most closely related to the sandy gallito (Teledromas fuscus).

== Description ==
The crested gallito is 21 cm (8.3 in) long. The male weighs 59 to 63.5 g (2.08 to 2.24 oz) and the female 51.5 to 64 g (1.82 to 2.26 oz). It is an unusual tapaculo, having long crown feathers that it often erects as a crest and even bends forward. It also has a long tail that it cocks upward. The nominate subspecies' head is cinnamon with white streaks, its upper parts including wings and tail olive gray. The throat and chest are pale gray, the sides of the breast chestnut, and the lower belly olive gray. R. l. saturata is similar but all of the colors are darker.

== Distribution and habitat ==
The nominate subspecies of crested gallito ranges from northern Argentina through the central part of the country south to northern Río Negro Province and southern Buenos Aires Province. R. l. saturata is found in southeastern Bolivia and western Paraguay.

The crested gallito inhabits Chaco forest from sea level to 1,800 m (5,900 ft), though R. l. saturata is found only in the lower elevations. It frequents thorny brush and undergrowth.

== Behavior ==
=== Feeding ===
The crested gallito forages on the ground or through low branches for arthropods.

=== Breeding ===
The crested gallito's nest is a ball of grass and other materials lined with hair or wool placed 1 to 2 m (3.3 to 6.6 ft) up in a dense bush or small tree. Up to three eggs are laid, usually between September and December. Both sexes incubate. Shiny cowbirds (Molothrus bonariensis) are known to parasitize the nest.

=== Vocalization ===
The crested gallito sings only during the breeding season, with "a loud, resonant, 'chirrup'...at intervals of 2-4 seconds." . The call is "a trilled 'wheer'" .

== Status ==
The IUCN has assessed the crested gallito as of Least Concern. It is overall uncommon but locally fairly common and occurs in several protected areas in Argentina. The population is not known but is believed to be stable.
