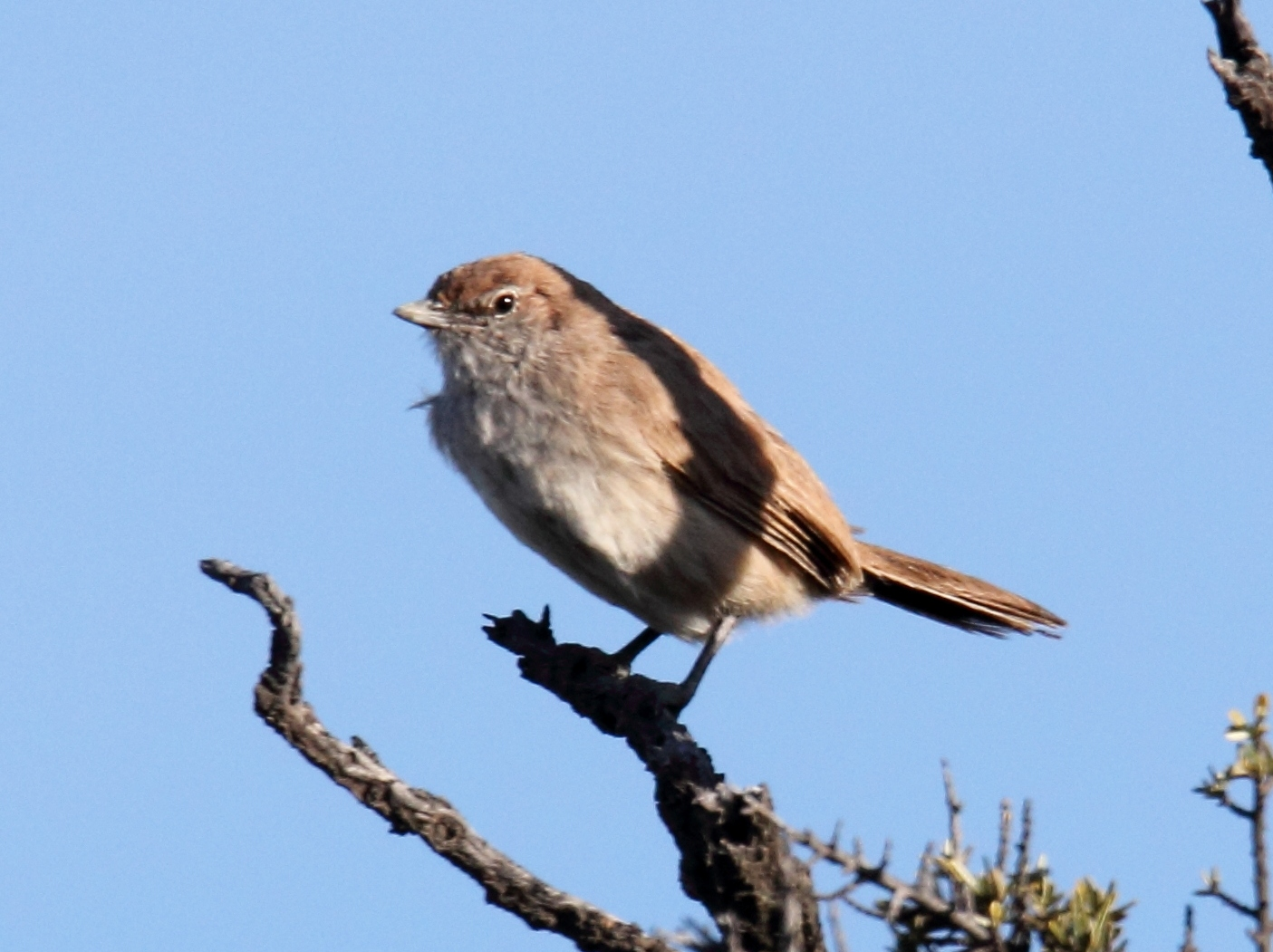

Conservation status
- Least Concern (IUCN 3.1)

Scientific classification
- Kingdom: Animalia
- Phylum: Chordata
- Class: Aves
- Order: Passeriformes
- Family: Rhinocryptidae
- Genus: Teledromas; Wetmore & Peters, 1922
- Species: T. fuscus

Binomial name
- Teledromas fuscus (Sclater, PL & Salvin, 1873)

= Sandy gallito =

Species of bird

The sandy gallito (Teledromas fuscus) is a species of suboscine passerine bird in the family Rhinocryptidae, the tapaculos. It is the only species placed in the genus Teledromas. It is endemic to Argentina.

== Taxonomy ==
The sandy gallito is the only member of its genus and has no subspecies. It is genetically most closely related to the crested gallito (Rhinocrypta lanceolata).

== Description ==
The sandy gallito is 17 cm (6.7 in) long. Two male specimens weighed 35.4 and 41.8 g (1.25 and 1.47 oz) respectively; one female weighted 35.8 g (1.26 oz). In the adult, the crown of the head, back, and wings are light cinnamon as are the central feathers of the tail. The rest of the tail is blackish. The throat and chest are white, blending to light cinnamon on the flanks and vent area. The juvenile is thought to have similar plumage.

The typical song of the sandy gallito is a phrase off "loud 'tchowk' notes" repeated up to five times in Río Negro and up to 10 times in other parts of the range.

== Distribution and habitat ==
The sandy gallito is a year round resident of the eastern slope of the Andes of Argentina from southwestern Salta Province in the north to Río Negro Province in the south. For most of that range it is found up to 3,500 m (11,500 ft) and in Salta up to 4,000 m (13,000 ft). Its habitat is subtropical or tropical dry shrubland characterized by sparse vegetation on sand and gravel, dry washes, and ravines.

== Behavior ==
=== Feeding ===
The sandy gallito's principal food is thought to be arthropods. It forages solely on the ground while trying to stay hidden by running between bushes.

=== Breeding ===
The sandy gallitos's nest is an open cup of grass, usually constructed at the end of a tunnel up to 50 cm (20 in) long. Eggs are laid between November and February.

== Status ==
The IUCN has assessed the sandy gallito as of Least Concern. Though its population has not been determined, it is believed to be stable and the species is thought to be fairly common. It inhabits several protected areas and its habitat is not amenable to agricultural development.
