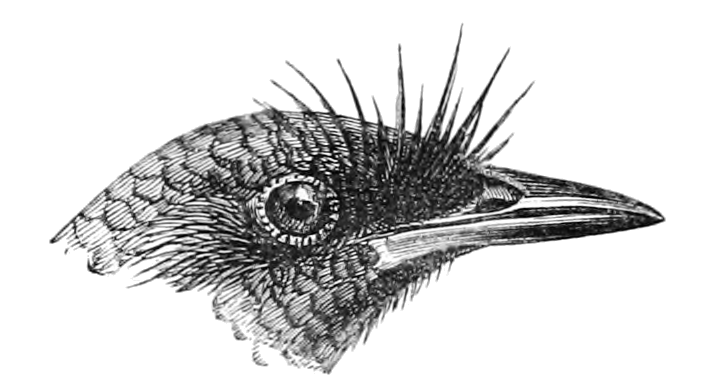
- Slaty bristlefront (Merulaxis ater)

Scientific classification
- Kingdom: Animalia
- Phylum: Chordata
- Class: Aves
- Order: Passeriformes
- Family: Rhinocryptidae
- Genus: Merulaxis; Lesson, 1831

Type species
- Merulaxis ater Lesson, 1831

= Merulaxis =

Genus of birds

Merulaxis or bristlefronts, is a genus of bird in the family Rhinocryptidae.

== Species ==
It contains the following species:

Male	Female	Scientific name	Common name	Distribution
		Merulaxis stresemanni	Stresemann's bristlefront	Brazil (Minas Gerais and Bahia)
		Merulaxis ater	Slaty bristlefront	Brazil (Espírito Santo south to Santa Catarina and Bahia)
