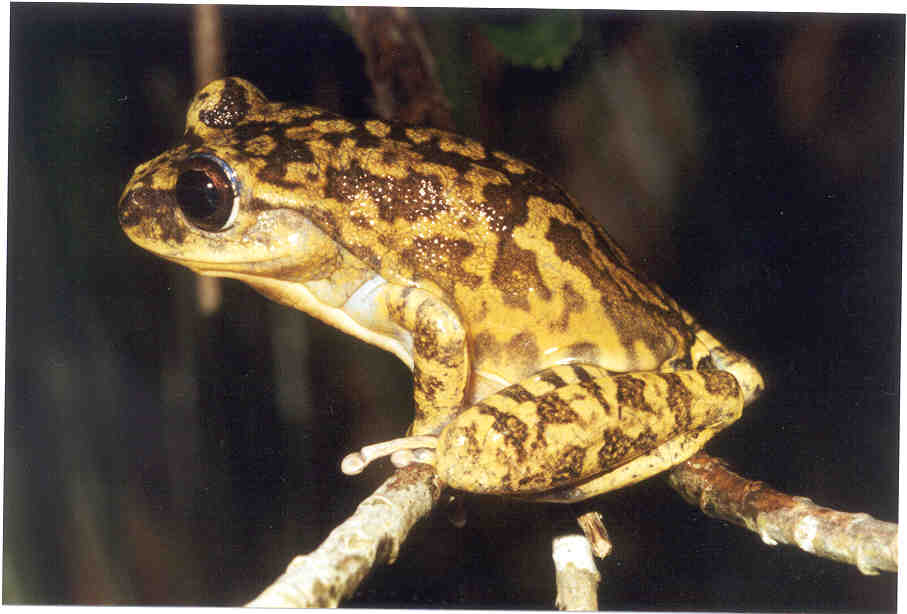
- Bokermannohyla saxicola

Scientific classification
- Kingdom: Animalia
- Phylum: Chordata
- Class: Amphibia
- Order: Anura
- Family: Hylidae
- Tribe: Cophomantini
- Genus: Bokermannohyla; Faivovich et al., 2005

Species
- 30 species (see text)

= Bokermannohyla =

Genus of amphibians

Bokermannohyla is a genus of frogs in the family Hylidae. It was erected in 2005 following a major revision of the Hylidae. Twenty-three species previously placed in the genus Hyla were moved to this genus named in honor of Werner Carlos Augusto Bokermann, Brazilian herpetologist. The genus is endemic to southern Brazil.

== Species ==
| Binomial name and author | Common name |
|---|---|
| Bokermannohyla ahenea (Napoli & Caramaschi, 2004) |
| Bokermannohyla alvarengai (Bokermann, 1956) | Santa Barbara tree frog |
| Bokermannohyla astartea (Bokermann, 1967) | Paranapiacaba tree frog |
| Bokermannohyla capra Napoli & Pimenta, 2009 |
| Bokermannohyla caramaschii (Napoli, 2005) |
| Bokermannohyla carvalhoi (Peixoto, 1981) | Carvalho's tree frog |
| Bokermannohyla circumdata (Cope, 1871) | Espirito Santo tree frog |
| Bokermannohyla claresignata (A. Lutz & B. Lutz, 1939) | Rio tree frog |
| Bokermannohyla clepsydra (A. Lutz, 1925) | São Paulo tree frog |
| Bokermannohyla diamantina Napoli & Juncá, 2006 |
| Bokermannohyla flavopicta Leite, Pezzuti & Garcia, 2012 |
| Bokermannohyla gouveai (Peixoto & Cruz, 1992) | Itatiaia tree frog |
| Bokermannohyla hylax (Heyer, 1985) | Atlantic forest tree frog |
| Bokermannohyla ibitiguara (Cardoso, 1983) | Fazenda Salto tree frog |
| Bokermannohyla ibitipoca (Caramaschi & Feio, 1990) | Ibitipoca tree frog |
| Bokermannohyla itapoty Lugli & Haddad, 2006 |
| Bokermannohyla izeckshoni (Jim & Caramaschi, 1979) | Izecksohn's tree frog |
| Bokermannohyla juiju Faivovich, Lugli, Lourenço & Haddad, 2009 |
| Bokermannohyla langei (Bokermann, 1965) | Marumbi tree frog |
| Bokermannohyla lucianae (Napoli & Pimenta, 2003) |
| Bokermannohyla luctuosa (Pombal & Haddad, 1993) | Reservoir tree frog |
| Bokermannohyla martinsi (Bokermann, 1964) | Martins' tree frog |
| Bokermannohyla nanuzae (Bokermann & Sazima, 1973) | Jaboticatubas tree frog |
| Bokermannohyla napolii de Carvalho, Giaretta & Magrini, 2012 |
| Bokermannohyla oxente Lugli & Haddad, 2006 |
| Bokermannohyla pseudopseudis (Miranda-Ribeiro, 1937) | Veadeiros tree frog |
| Bokermannohyla ravida (Caramaschi, Napoli & Bernardes, 2001) |
| Bokermannohyla sagarana Leite, Pezzuti & Drummond, 2011 |
| Bokermannohyla sapiranga Brandão, de Magalhães, Garda, Campos, Sebben & Maciel, 2012 |
| Bokermannohyla saxicola (Bokermann, 1964) |
| Bokermannohyla sazimai (Cardoso & Andrade, 1982) | Zagaia tree frog |
| Bokermannohyla vulcaniae Vasconcelos & Giaretta, 2005 |
