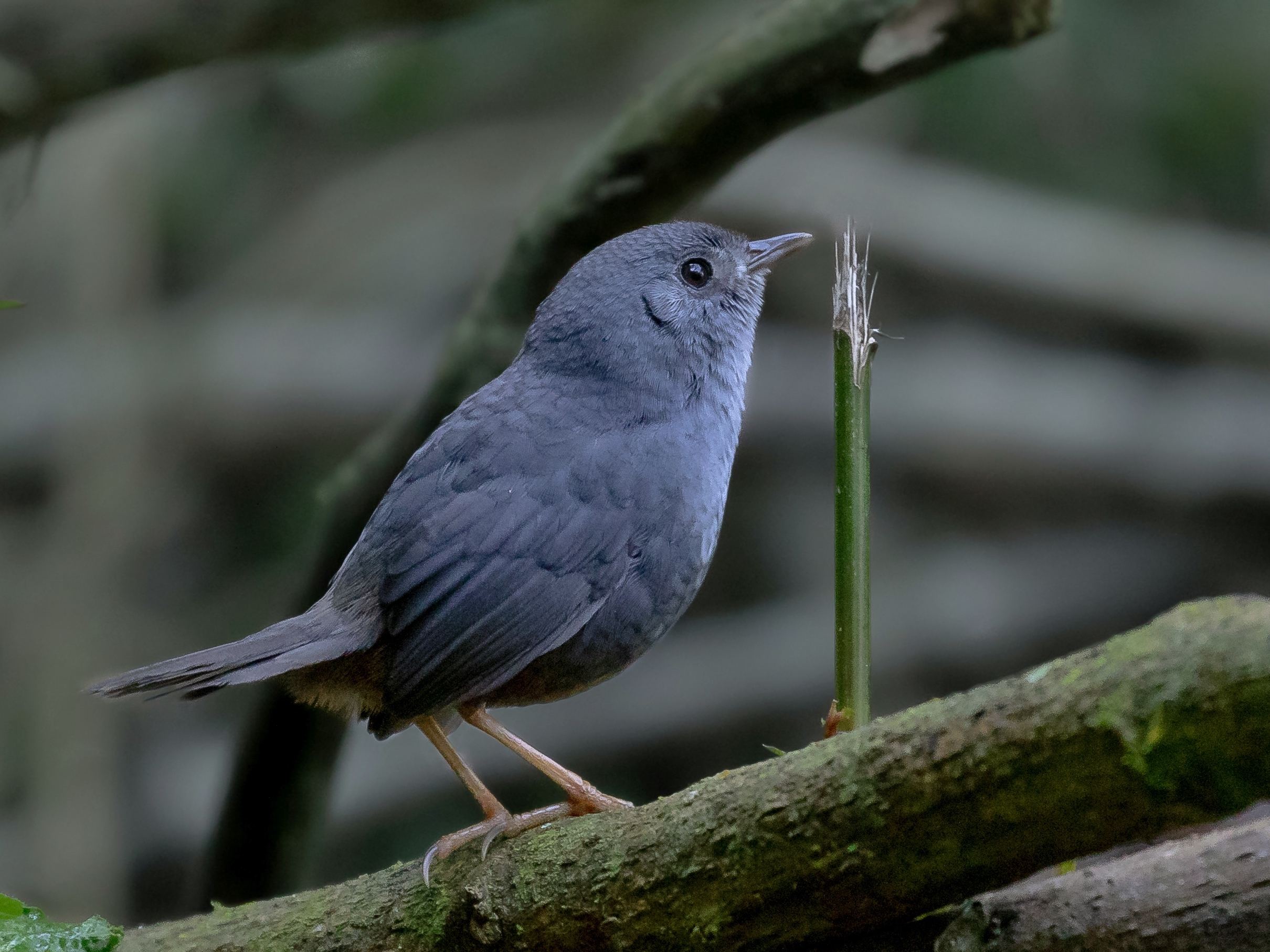
- At Serra da Mantiqueira, Monteiro Lobato; São Paulo state, Brazil.

Conservation status
- Least Concern (IUCN 3.1)

Scientific classification
- Kingdom: Animalia
- Phylum: Chordata
- Class: Aves
- Order: Passeriformes
- Family: Rhinocryptidae
- Genus: Scytalopus
- Species: S. petrophilus

Binomial name
- Scytalopus petrophilus Whitney et al., 2010

= Rock tapaculo =

Species of bird

The rock tapaculo or Espinhaço tapaculo (Scytalopus petrophilus) is a species of bird in the family Rhinocryptidae. It is endemic to altitudes of 900–2,100 metres (3,000–6,900 ft) in the central and southern Espinhaço Mountains, and the Mantiqueira Mountains in Minas Gerais, Brazil, though it may also occur in adjacent parts of Rio de Janeiro and São Paulo. It is found in shrubby and grassy habitats in rocky regions, and in elfin and cloud forest. It closely resembles the Diamantina tapaculo and Planalto tapaculo in appearance and voice (especially song; less so in call).

Here we follow South American Classification Committee (SACC), but the taxonomy is extremely complex, and it is possible the correct scientific name of this relatively pale inland species is S. speluncae, in which case the closely related darker species from the Serra do Mar region would be S. notorius.

== Taxonomy ==
=== Scientific name ===
In 2006, doubt about the use of the scientific name S. speluncae for the mouse-coloured tapaculo surfaced. An examination of the type specimen of S. speluncae (Ménétriés, 1835) resulted in the conclusion that this name belonged to a relatively pale population from the Espinhaço Mountains that had been included within S. novacapitalis (vocally, this population is closer to S. pachecoi). This meant that the relatively dark population of the Serra do Mar region –the population that traditionally had been called S. speluncae– had to receive a new name: S. notorius ("notorius" to illustrate its problematic taxonomic history). This conclusion was questioned in 2007, which maintained that the population of the Serra do Mar region is S. speluncae, while the population of the central and southern Espinhaço Mountains was considered undescribed, and the population of the northernmost Espinhaço Mountains was described as a new species, S. diamantinensis. Although the possibility of two species in the Espinhaço Mountains was not questioned in an article published the following year, the conclusion that the name S. speluncae belonged to the species of the Serra do Mar was; mainly on the basis that no direct comparison of the type specimen of S. speluncae had been made in 2007 (unlike in the article from 2006). In 2010, other authors came to a different conclusion, as they suggested the original description by Édouard Ménétries in 1835 more closely matched the relatively dark species of the Serra do Mar region. They also concluded that the original type locality of São João del Rei (within the range of the relatively pale central and south Espinhaço Mountains species) provided by Ménétries was incorrect, and it actually was collected somewhere in central Rio de Janeiro (within the range of the Serra do Mar species). Following this, the relatively pale species of the southern and central Espinhaço Mountains region was described as a new species, S. petrophilus. This view was supported by SACC.

Phylogenetic evidence suggests that undescribed taxa from the genus Scytalopus remain in eastern Brazil.

=== English name ===
Regardless of the correct scientific name, three different English names have been used for the relatively pale species of the central and southern Espinhaço Mountains: Mouse-coloured tapaculo (used briefly by Comitê Brasileiro de Registros Ornitológicos, but not anymore), Espinhaço tapaculo and rock tapaculo. The name mouse-coloured tapaculo is likely to cause confusion, as it, until 2006, always had been used for other populations, and most, if not all, Scytalopus tapaculos are largely mouse-grey in colour. The northernmost population in the Espinhaço Mountains is now considered a separate species, S. diamantinensis, which makes the name Espinhaço tapaculo for the population in the central and southern part of this range non-unique. Many species of tapaculos are found in rocky habitats, and the species of the central and southern Espinhaço Mountains is not entirely restricted to rocky habitats, which makes the name rock tapaculo less than perfect.
