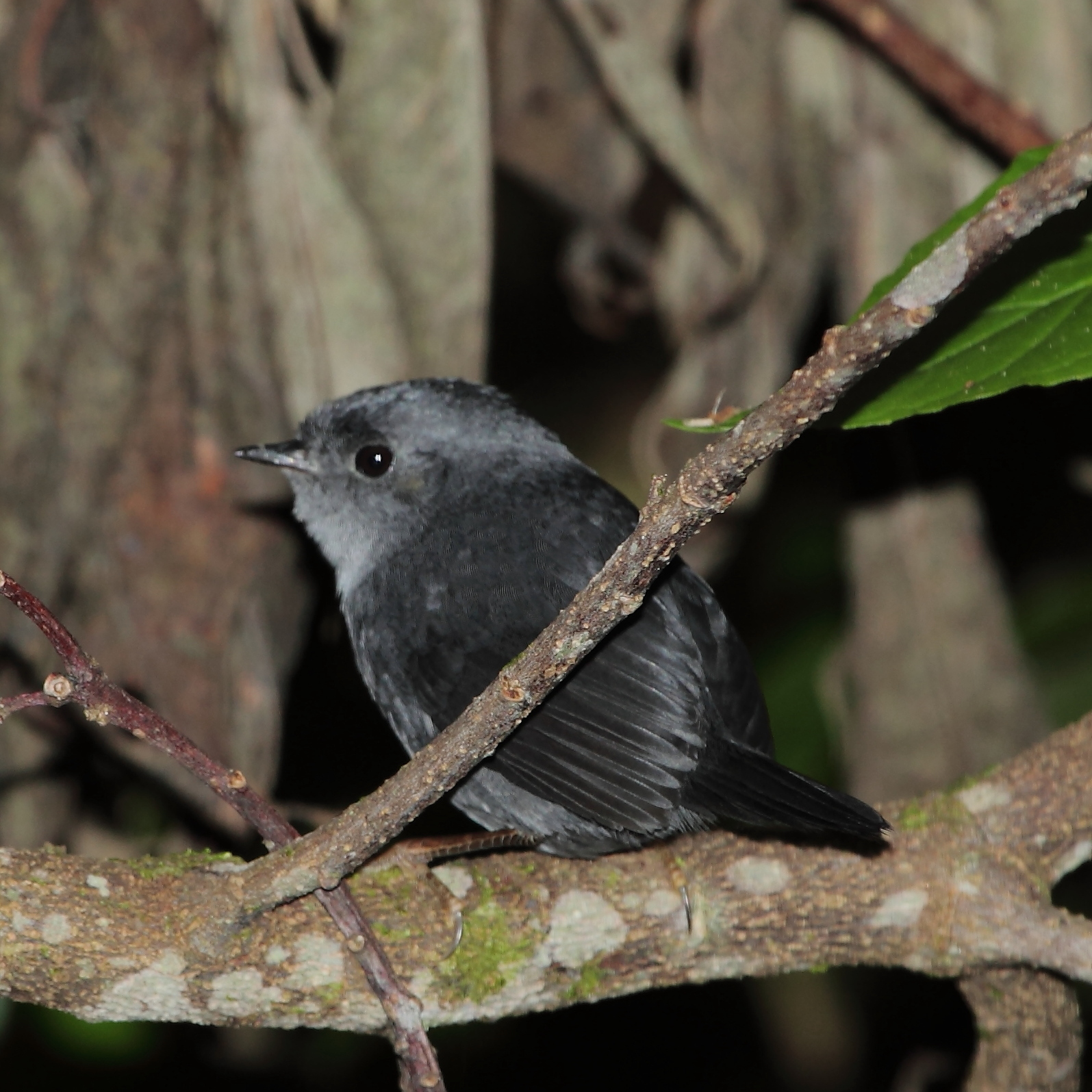
- at Campos do Jordão, São Paulo State, Brazil.

Conservation status
- Least Concern (IUCN 3.1)

Scientific classification
- Kingdom: Animalia
- Phylum: Chordata
- Class: Aves
- Order: Passeriformes
- Family: Rhinocryptidae
- Genus: Scytalopus
- Species: S. speluncae

Binomial name
- Scytalopus speluncae (Ménétries, 1835)

Synonyms
- Scytalopus notorius Raposo et al., 2006

= Mouse-coloured tapaculo =

Species of bird in Brazil

The mouse-coloured tapaculo or Serra do Mar tapaculo (Scytalopus speluncae) is a species of bird in the family Rhinocryptidae. It is endemic to humid highland forests in southeastern Brazil, where it ranges from southwestern Espírito Santo to northeastern Rio Grande do Sul. Most of its range is in the Serra do Mar, but it also occurs further inland in Paraná and Santa Catarina. Until 2005, the Planalto tapaculo was included in the mouse-coloured tapaculo.

Here we follow SACC, but the taxonomy is extremely complex, and it is possible the correct scientific name of this relatively dark species is S. notorius, in which case the closely related paler species from the Espinhaço Mountains region would be S. speluncae.

== Taxonomy ==
In 2005, it was found that the otherwise relatively well known S. speluncae actually consisted of two species, of which the southern was described as a new species, S. pachecoi, while the northern retained S. speluncae. It was further suggested that S. speluncae included yet another undescribed species, but more work was needed on that matter.

=== Scientific name ===
In 2006, doubt about the use of the scientific name S. speluncae for the mouse-coloured tapaculo surfaced. An examination of the type specimen of S. speluncae (Ménétriés, 1835) resulted in the conclusion that this name belonged to a relatively pale population from the Espinhaço Mountains that had been included within S. novacapitalis (vocally, this population is closer to S. pachecoi). This meant that the relatively dark population of the Serra do Mar region – the population that traditionally had been called S. speluncae – had to receive a new name: S. notorius ("notorius" to illustrate its problematic taxonomic history). This conclusion was questioned in 2007, which maintained that the population of the Serra do Mar region is S. speluncae, while the population of the central and southern Espinhaço Mountains was considered undescribed, and the population of the northernmost Espinhaço Mountains was described as a new species, S. diamantinensis. Although the possibility of two species in the Espinhaço Mountains was not questioned in an article published the following year, the conclusion that the name S. speluncae belonged to the species of the Serra do Mar was; mainly on the basis that no direct comparison of the type specimen of S. speluncae had been made in 2007 (unlike in the article from 2006). In 2010, other authors came to a different conclusion, as they suggested the original description by Édouard Ménétries in 1835 more closely matched the relatively dark species of the Serra do Mar region. They also concluded that the original type locality of São João del Rei (within the range of the relatively pale central and south Espinhaço Mountains species) provided by Ménétries was incorrect, and it actually was collected somewhere in central Rio de Janeiro (within the range of the Serra do Mar species). Following this, the relatively pale species of the southern and central Espinhaço Mountains region was described as a new species, S. petrophilus. This view was supported by SACC.

Phylogenetic evidence suggests that undescribed taxa from the genus Scytalopus remain in eastern Brazil.

=== English name ===
Regardless of the correct scientific name, the English names mouse-coloured tapaculo and Serra do Mar tapaculo have both been used for the relatively dark species of the Serra do Mar region, but neither is perfect: Most tapaculos of the genus Scytalopus are largely mouse-grey in colour, and what was included in the mouse-coloured tapaculo until 2005 is very different from what would be included in the mouse-coloured tapaculo today. Additionally, the relatively pale species of the central and southern Espinhaço Mountains has been called the mouse-coloured tapaculo (used briefly by Comitê Brasileiro de Registros Ornitológicos, but not anymore), which could add additional confusion. The name Serra do Mar tapaculo for the species of the Serra do Mar region is also potentially misleading, as it is not entirely restricted to this mountain range, but also occurs far inland in Paraná and Santa Catarina.
