= Bokermannohyla astartea =

Conservation status
- Least Concern (IUCN 3.1)

Scientific classification
- Kingdom: Animalia
- Phylum: Chordata
- Class: Amphibia
- Order: Anura
- Family: Hylidae
- Genus: Bokermannohyla
- Species: B. astartea

Binomial name
- Bokermannohyla astartea (Bokermann, 1967)

Species of frog

Bokermannohyla astartea is a species of frog in the family Hylidae. It is endemic to Brazil. forests that have never been cut down where the tree branches come together like a roof. It puts its eggs in water in bromeliad plants, and the tadpoles swim and grow in the water.

== Habitat ==
Scientists have seen this frog between 700 and 1,000 m (2,300 and 3,280 ft) above sea level. Scientists have seen the frog in protected places.

== Threats ==
The IUCN classifies this species as least concern of extinction. It lives in Serra do Mar, which has large tracts of suitable forest habitat. In some places, some of the frogs may be in danger from urbanization, agriculture, silviculture, and cattle grazing.
