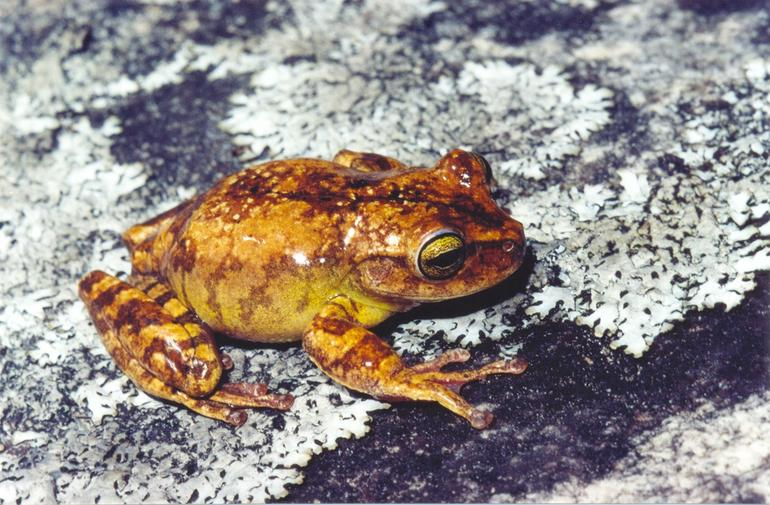

Conservation status
- Least Concern (IUCN 3.1)

Scientific classification
- Kingdom: Animalia
- Phylum: Chordata
- Class: Amphibia
- Order: Anura
- Family: Hylidae
- Genus: Bokermannohyla
- Species: B. nanuzae

Binomial name
- Bokermannohyla nanuzae (Bokermann and Sazima, 1973)

Synonyms
- Hyla nanuzae Bokermann and Sazima, 1973; Hyla feioi Napoli and Caramaschi, 2004; Bokermannohyla feioi (Napoli and Caramaschi, 2004)

= Bokermannohyla nanuzae =

Species of frog

Bokermannohyla nanuzae is a species of frog in the family Hylidae. It is endemic to Brazil and known from the Serra do Espinhaço and Serra da Mantiqueira in the Minas Gerais state.

== Etymology ==
The specific name nanuzae honours Nanuza Luiza de Menezes, one of Brazil's most important botanists.

== Habitat and conservation ==
Bokermannohyla nanuzae is a common species that occurs on vegetation near streams in gallery forests at elevations of 800 m (2,600 ft) above sea level and higher. It is threatened by habitat loss caused by mining, fires, and infrastructure development for human settlement. Also disturbance by tourists is a threat. It occurs in the Serra do Cipó National Park.
