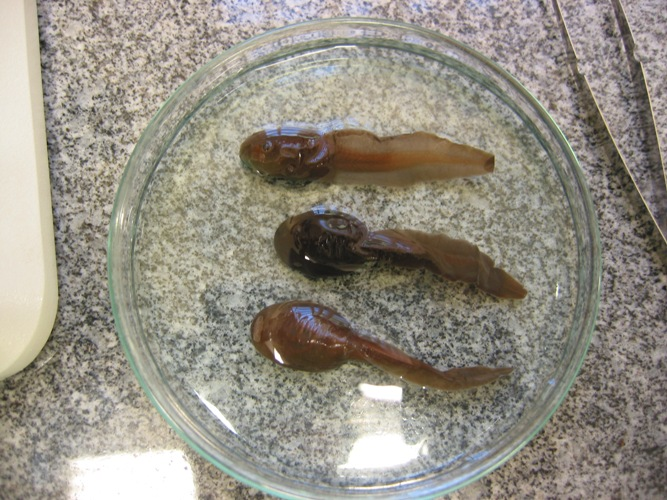
- Bokermannohyla martinsi tadpoles.

Conservation status
- Least Concern (IUCN 3.1)

Scientific classification
- Kingdom: Animalia
- Phylum: Chordata
- Class: Amphibia
- Order: Anura
- Family: Hylidae
- Genus: Bokermannohyla
- Species: B. martinsi

Binomial name
- Bokermannohyla martinsi (Bokermann, 1964)

= Bokermannohyla martinsi =

Species of amphibian

Bokermannohyla martinsi is a species of frogs in the family Hylidae. It is endemic to Brazil. Its natural habitats are moist savanna, subtropical or tropical moist shrubland, subtropical or tropical high-altitude shrubland, and rivers. It is threatened by habitat loss.

== Etymology ==
The specific epithet martinsi is a homage to Brazilian entomologist Ubirajara Ribeiro Martins.
