= Bokermannohyla itapoty =

Conservation status
- Least Concern (IUCN 3.1)

Scientific classification
- Kingdom: Animalia
- Phylum: Chordata
- Class: Amphibia
- Order: Anura
- Family: Hylidae
- Genus: Bokermannohyla
- Species: B. itapoty

Binomial name
- Bokermannohyla itapoty Lugli and Haddad, 2006

Species of amphibian

Bokermannohyla itapoty is a species of frogs in the family Hylidae. It is endemic to the state of Bahia in northeastern Brazil. It is closely related to Bokermannohyla alvarengai. The specific name itapoty refers to the dorsal coloration that gives this frog a lichen-like resemblance. The name is derived from the Tupi–Guarani words itá (="rock") and poty (= "to flower" or "to flourish"), meaning lichen or moss.

== Description ==
Adult males measure 38–46 mm (1.5–1.8 in) and adult females 43–50 mm (1.7–2.0 in) in snout–vent length. The snout is short and truncate. The tympanum is large but not very evident. The eyes are large and laterally protruding. The fingers and toes are webbed and bear terminal discs; the toes are more heavily webbed than the fingers but bear slightly smaller discs. The dorsum is usually light yellow to dark yellow or greenish with irregularly shaped black blotches; some specimens are white-cream with yellow blotches. The black blotches can be isolated or connected, resembling a web with light spots in the center. Some individuals have small black spots on the dorsum. One female specimen had an inverse color pattern (yellow blotches on black background). The throat in adults is white-cream with black spots. The iris is golden yellow with intense black vermiculation.

The male advertisement calls are emitted at irregular intervals and last 7–51 seconds, consisting of 16–79 short notes. Tadpoles of Gosner stage 37 measure 74 mm (2.9 in) in total length, of which the body makes 22 mm (0.9 in).

== Habitat, ecology, and conservation ==
Bokermannohyla itapoty occur in rocky montane fields at elevations of 500–1,300 m (1,600–4,300 ft) above sea level. They are active at night close to streams. During the day, adults can be found on rocks, sandy soil, or rupicolous vegetation, generally in sunlight, but some occupy rock crevices. Males are territorial and call throughout the night. Breeding takes place throughout the year. Eggs are deposited as loose aggregates on the rocky bottom of stream backwaters. Tadpoles occur in the rocky substrate of streams and generally avoid areas of high flow.

Bokermannohyla itapoty is not considered threatened because it is likely to have a wide distribution and large population, and it occurs in an area where its habitats are not significantly threatened.
