= Bokermannohyla sapiranga =

Scientific classification
- Domain: Eukaryota
- Kingdom: Animalia
- Phylum: Chordata
- Class: Amphibia
- Order: Anura
- Family: Hylidae
- Genus: Bokermannohyla
- Species: B. sapiranga

Binomial name
- Bokermannohyla sapiranga Brandão, Magalhães, Garda, Campos, Sebben, and Maciel, 2012

Species of frog

Bokermannohyla sapiranga is a species of frog in the family Hylidae. It is endemic to south-central Brazil (Federal District; eastern Goiás and adjacent Minas Gerais states). It type locality is Roncador Ecological Reserve.
