= Bokermannohyla langei =

Conservation status
- Data Deficient (IUCN 3.1)

Scientific classification
- Kingdom: Animalia
- Phylum: Chordata
- Class: Amphibia
- Order: Anura
- Family: Hylidae
- Genus: Bokermannohyla
- Species: B. langei

Binomial name
- Bokermannohyla langei (Bokermann, 1965)

Species of frog

Bokermannohyla langei is a species of frog in the family Hylidae. It is endemic to Brazil, known only from Paraná. It is known from three specimens collected in 1953 and searches since 1986 have not found this frog. Its natural habitats are subtropical or tropical moist lowland forests, rivers, freshwater marshes, and intermittent freshwater marshes. It may be threatened by touristic activities but is protected by Parque Estadual Pico do Marumbi.
