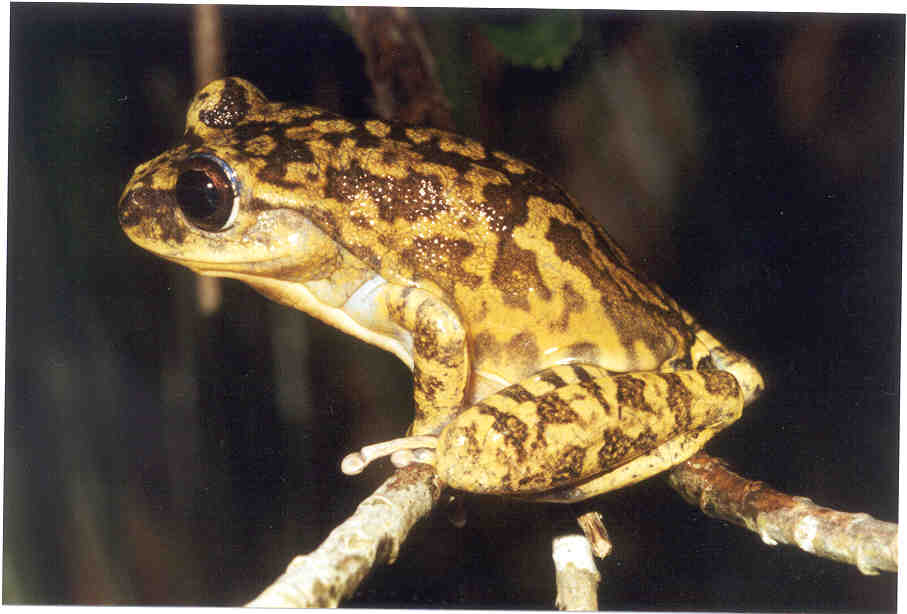

Conservation status
- Least Concern (IUCN 3.1)

Scientific classification
- Kingdom: Animalia
- Phylum: Chordata
- Class: Amphibia
- Order: Anura
- Family: Hylidae
- Genus: Bokermannohyla
- Species: B. saxicola

Binomial name
- Bokermannohyla saxicola (Bokermann, 1964)

= Bokermannohyla saxicola =

Species of frog

Bokermannohyla saxicola is a species of frog in the family Hylidae. It is endemic to Brazil. Its natural habitats are moist savanna, subtropical or tropical moist shrubland, subtropical or tropical high-altitude shrubland, subtropical or tropical dry lowland grassland, rivers, and intermittent rivers. It is threatened by habitat loss.
