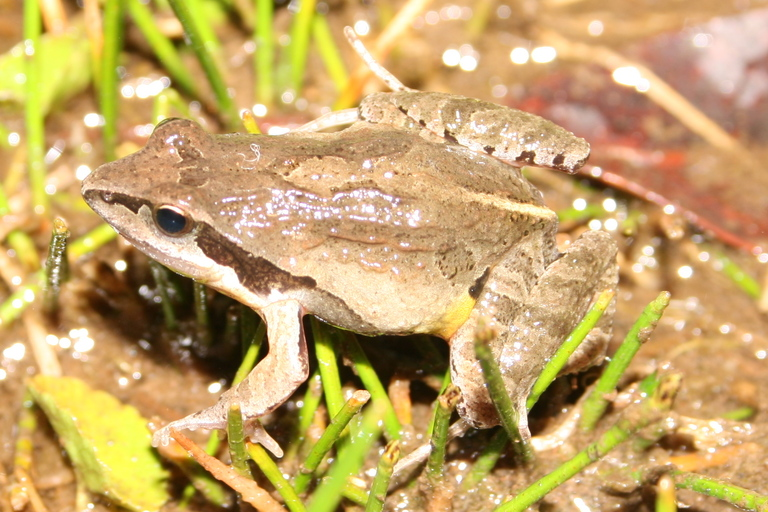

Conservation status
- Least Concern (IUCN 3.1)

Scientific classification
- Kingdom: Animalia
- Phylum: Chordata
- Class: Amphibia
- Order: Anura
- Family: Leptodactylidae
- Genus: Physalaemus
- Species: P. barrioi

Binomial name
- Physalaemus barrioi Bokermann, 1967

= Physalaemus barrioi =

Species of frog

Physalaemus barrioi is a species of frog in the family Leptodactylidae. It is endemic to Serra do Bocaina in São Paulo state, Brazil. The specific name barrioi honors Avelino Barrio, a Spanish botanist and zoologist who lived in Argentina. However, the common name Bocaina dwarf frog has been proposed for it.

== Description ==
Adult males measure 24–29 mm (0.9–1.1 in) in snout–vent length. The head is triangular and longer than it is wide. The snout is sub-elliptical in dorsal view and acuminate laterally. The tympanum is concealed and the supratympanic fold is weakly developed. The fingers and the toes lack fringes and webbing. Coloration is dorsally brown or green, with some patterning that helps to camouflage the animal. A dark stripe runs from the canthus rostralis to the middle of the flank.

The male advertisement call consists of a single, modulated, non-pulsed note lasting about 1.2 seconds. The calls are emitted at a rate of about 8 calls per minute.

Tadpoles have an ovoid body when viewed dorsally and globular when viewed laterally. The body is dark brown and has two dark stripes that continue onto the tail. Gosner stage 37 tadpoles measure about 27 mm (1.1 in) in total length; the body is about 10 mm (0.4 in).

== Habitat and conservation ==
Physalaemus barrioi is a terrestrial species found in forests and grassland at elevations of about 1,200–1,550 m (3,940–5,090 ft) above sea level. Males call at night from bases of small thickets in open marsh areas. Foam nests are anchored at the base of marginal vegetation, typically grasses. Tadpoles can be found in permanent shallow marshes and small ponds with clay bottoms.

Physalaemus barrioi occurs within and near the Serra da Bocaina National Park. The species may be negatively affected by reforestation as it is current more commonly found in open montane grasslands.
