= Bokermannohyla ibitipoca =

Conservation status
- Data Deficient (IUCN 3.1)

Scientific classification
- Kingdom: Animalia
- Phylum: Chordata
- Class: Amphibia
- Order: Anura
- Family: Hylidae
- Genus: Bokermannohyla
- Species: B. ibitipoca

Binomial name
- Bokermannohyla ibitipoca (Caramaschi & Feio, 1990)

Species of frog

Bokermannohyla ibitipoca is a species of frog in the family Hylidae. It is endemic to Parque Estadual do Ibitipoca, Brazil. Its natural habitats are subtropical or tropical moist montane forests and rivers. It is threatened by habitat degradation for touristic activities.
