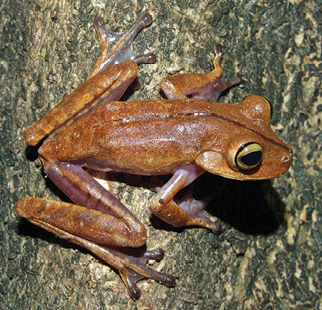

Conservation status
- Data Deficient (IUCN 3.1)

Scientific classification
- Kingdom: Animalia
- Phylum: Chordata
- Class: Amphibia
- Order: Anura
- Family: Hylidae
- Genus: Bokermannohyla
- Species: B. lucianae

Binomial name
- Bokermannohyla lucianae (Napoli & Pimenta, 2003)

= Bokermannohyla lucianae =

Species of amphibian

Bokermannohyla lucianae is a species of frogs in the family Hylidae.

It is endemic to Una, Bahia, Brazil.

Its natural habitats are subtropical or tropical moist lowland forests, rivers, and intermittent freshwater marshes. Threats are unknown but it is known from protected areas Reserva Particular do Patrimônio Natural Ecoparque de Una and Reserva Particular do Patrimônio Natural Ecoparque de Una.
