= Serra da Bocaina National Park =

National park in Brazil

- IUCN category II (national park)
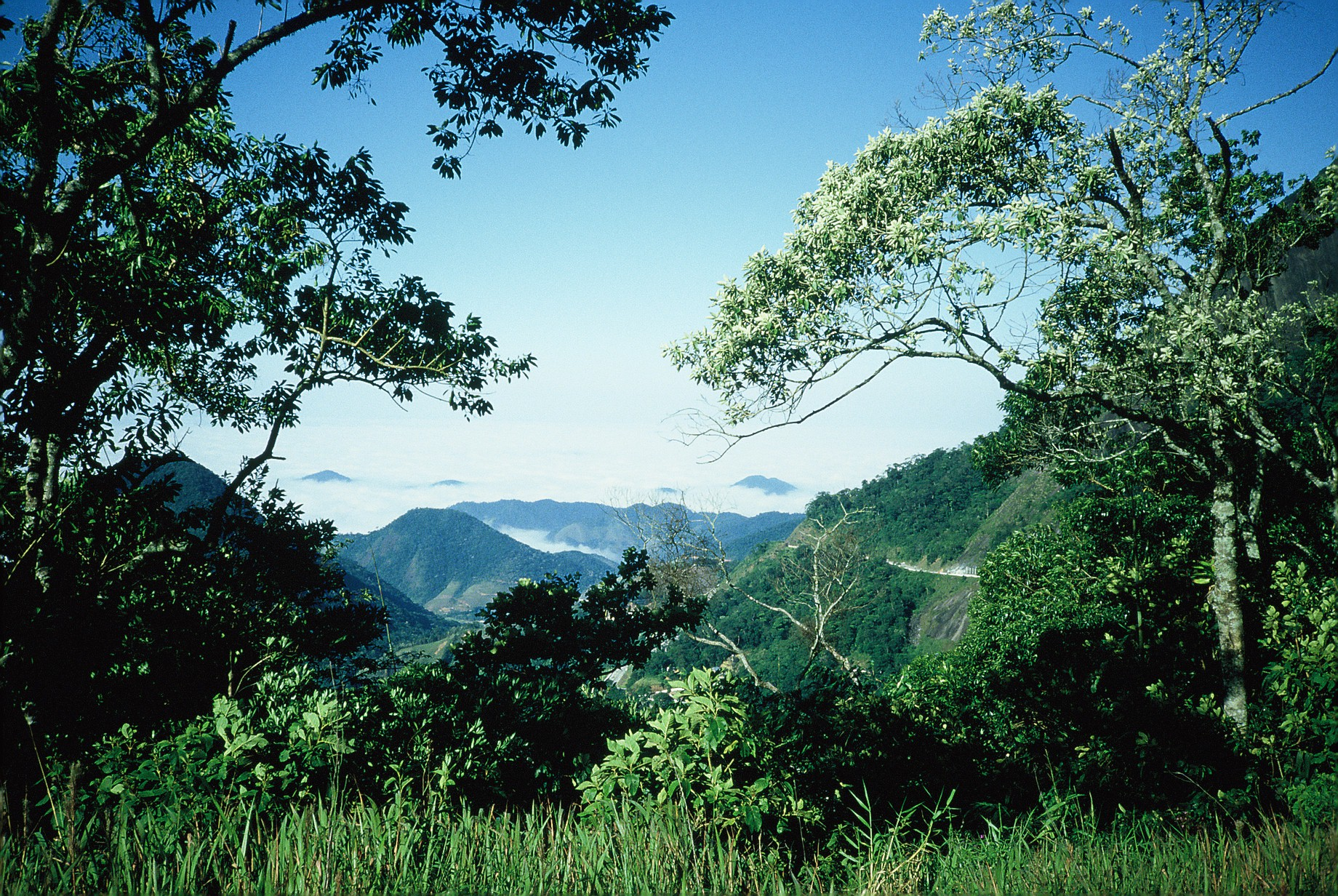
- Serra da Bocaina

- Location within Brazil
- Location: southeastern Brazil
- Coordinates: 22°57′47″S 44°40′12″W
- Area: 104,000 ha (260,000 acres)
- Established: 1971

UNESCO World Heritage Site
- Part of: Paraty and Ilha Grande – Culture and Biodiversity
- Criteria: Mixed: v, x
- Reference: 1308rev-001
- Inscription: 2019 (43rd Session)

Serra da Bocaina National Park is a national park of Brazil. It straddles the border of the states of Rio de Janeiro and São Paulo in southeastern Brazil. Roughly 60% of its territory sits within the state of Rio de Janeiro, while the remaining 40% lies within São Paulo.

== Location ==
Created by Federal Decree in 1971, the park comprises an area of approximately 104,000 hectares (260,000 acres) and features significant biodiversity. The park headquarters is located in São José do Barreiro, the State of São Paulo. It is administered by the Chico Mendes Institute for Biodiversity Conservation (ICMBio). It is estimated that 60% of the vegetation is composed of native Atlantic Forest, and the rest is forest regenerated (secondary) for over 30 years.

The highest point is Pico do Tira o Chapéu, which at 2,088 metres (6,850 ft) above sea level is one of the highest points of the State of São Paulo.

The park is part of the 221,754 hectares (547,970 acres) Bocaina Mosaic, created in 2006.

== Biota ==
Among the species of flora are pines, cedars, trumpet trees, palm trees and bromeliads. Among the fauna of the park are cats, sloths, deer, monkeys, snakes and birds.

A number of amphibians are only known from the park and its buffer area: Brachycephalus vertebralis, Ischnocnema pusilla, Bokermannohyla ahenea, Bokermannohyla clepsydra, Scinax ariadne, Megaelosia bocainensis, Physalaemus barrioi, and Paratelmatobius gaigeae.

== See also ==
- Três Pontas Mountains

== Sources ==
- Mosaico de Unidades de Conservação da Bocaina - SP e RJ (PDF) (in Portuguese), RBMA
