= IBGE Ecological Reserve =

Protected area in Brazil

- Reserva Ecológica do IBGE; Reserva Ecológica do Roncador (RECOR)
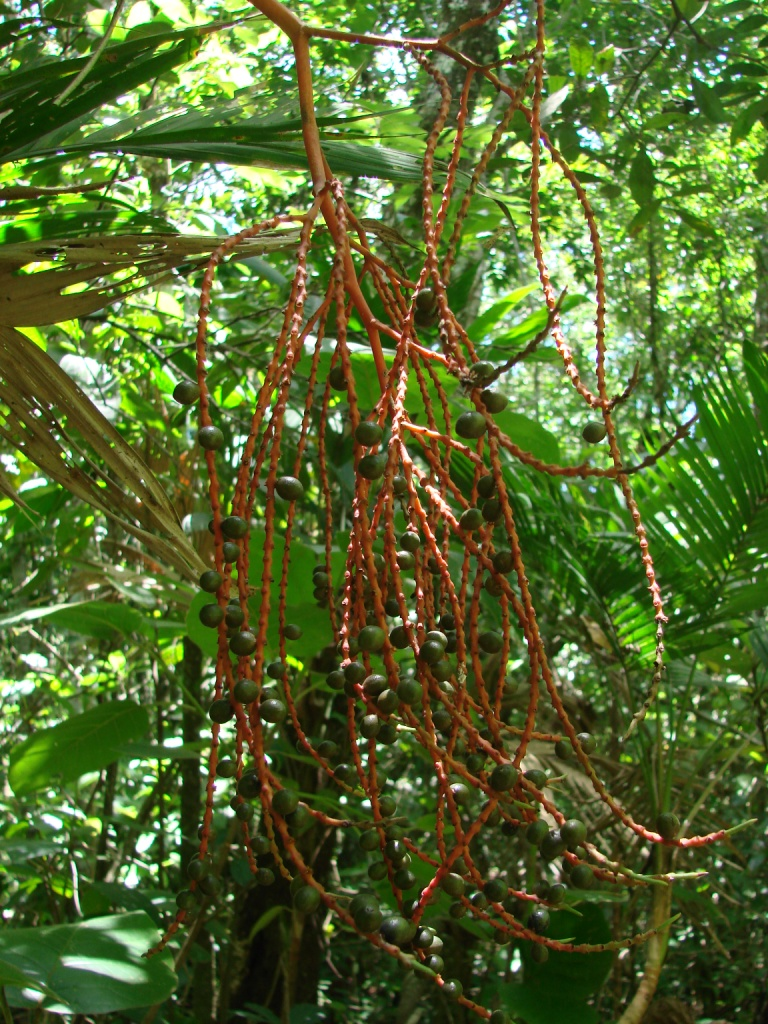
- Geonoma brevispatha in the reserve

- Location within Brazil
- Location: Federal District
- Nearest city: Jardim Botânico
- Coordinates: 15.948556°S 47.880868°W
- Area: 1,300 hectares (3,200 acres)
- Created: 22 December 1975
- Website: recor.ibge.gov.br

The IBGE Ecological Reserve (Portuguese: Reserva Ecológica do IBGE, (Note: This article follows the Library of Congress in preferring the formal name "Reserva Ecológica do IBGE", assumed in 1978, although the original acronym RECOR is still used by the reserve's publications.) formerly named as Reserva Ecológica do Roncador (RECOR) ), is a protected area in the Federal District, Brazil. It has a diverse ecology including various rare or endangered species, and is an important center for research into the ecology of the poorly protected Cerrado environment. Numerous scientific papers have referred to research conducted in the reserve.

== Location ==
Sketch map

The IBGE Ecological Reserve covers 1,300 hectares (3,200 acres) and is 25 kilometres (16 mi) south of Brasilia. It is bounded by the University of Brasília's 4,500 hectares (11,000 acres) experimental farm Fazenda Água Limpa (FAL) to the west and the 5,000 hectares (12,000 acres) Estação Ecológica do Jardim Botânico de Brasília (EEJBB) to the north and east. These form the Environmental Protection Area of the Gama-Cabeça de Veado District, with 10,000 hectares (25,000 acres) of contiguous protected area. The reserve is a very representative zone of central Brazil, with all the typical aspects of the cerrado.

The terrain consists of a gently sloping plateau divided by stream valleys, and ranges in altitude from 1,048 metres (3,438 ft) to 1,160 metres (3,810 ft). It is drained towards the northwest by the Taquara, the Taquara's tributary the Roncador, and the Roncador's tributaries the Escondido, Monjolo and Pitoco. The area includes Precambrian metasedimentary rocks of the Paranoá Group from the Brasiliano orogeny (550 to 900 million years ago), but most of the land is covered by Tertiary detrital laterite material.

The reserve is one of the permanent conservation areas of the Federal District along with Brasília National Park (Parque Nacional de Brasília), the Estação Ecológica de Águas Emendadas and the Estação Ecológica do Jardim Botânico de Brasília. It is one of the core areas of the Cerrado Biosphere Reserve created by UNESCO in the Federal District in 1993. It is also part of the Federal Government's Central Plateau Environmental Protection Area (Área de Proteção Ambiental - APA do Planalto Central). Access is restricted to researchers.

== History ==
Until 1956 the area occupied by the reserve had been occupied by cattle herders and subsistence farmers. The Federal District requisitioned the land that year, and donated it to the Brazilian Institute of Geography and Statistics (Instituto Brasileiro de Geografia e Estatística, IBGE) in 1961. The IBGE created the Reserva Ecológica do Roncador (RECOR) on 22 December 1975 as an ecological reserve for scientific research into the Brazilian Cerrado. In 1978 the Brazilian Institute for Forest Development (Instituto Brasileiro de Desenvolvimento Florestal, IBDF) recognized the reserve as a permanent conservation area of scientific interest. The name was changed to the Reserva Ecológica do IBGE, although the acronym RECOR was retained.

Around this time several scientific papers were published on subjects such as insect ecology, tree growth and heavy metal pollution in the reserve. The IBGE created a fire brigade, a specialized library and administrative buildings. A weather station was established in 1979–80, and a nursery was started for studies on plant propagation. The reserve has laboratories for animal and plant ecology. By the mid 1980s the reserve was one of main areas of research into the cerrado in the Federal District. RECOR continues to be an extremely active center of research.

The Cerrado is the richest savanna ecosystem in the world. Only 2.2% is fully protected in Brazil. As of 2009 the biome was being destroyed at about 14,200 square kilometres (5,500 sq mi) annually, so the need to document the ecology is urgent. Researchers have studied plants, fish, birds, mammals and insects of the cerrado, and the impact of fire. As of 2011 more than 1,000 scientific works had used research from the reserve, including 177 doctoral dissertations and theses.

== Climate and ecology ==
There is a rainy season from September/October until April/May, and a dry season from May to September. Average annual rainfall is 1,453 millimetres (57.2 in). The average annual temperature is 20 °C (68 °F), with average range from 15.4 °C (59.7 °F) in June/July to 27 °C (81 °F) in September/October, after which cloud cover reduces the amount of sunshine.

Climate data for IBGE Ecological Reserve (Roncador) 1981–2010, extremes 1994–present
Month	Jan	Feb	Mar	Apr	May	Jun	Jul	Aug	Sep	Oct	Nov	Dec	Year
Record high °C (°F)	33.1 (91.6)	33.1 (91.6)	31.2 (88.2)	31.4 (88.5)	31.5 (88.7)	29.4 (84.9)	30.5 (86.9)	33.8 (92.8)	35.5 (95.9)	35.1 (95.2)	34.2 (93.6)	33.7 (92.7)	35.5 (95.9)
Mean daily maximum °C (°F)	27.6 (81.7)	28.0 (82.4)	27.6 (81.7)	27.4 (81.3)	26.6 (79.9)	25.9 (78.6)	26.3 (79.3)	28.2 (82.8)	29.9 (85.8)	29.8 (85.6)	27.7 (81.9)	27.4 (81.3)	27.7 (81.9)
Daily mean °C (°F)	21.5 (70.7)	21.6 (70.9)	21.3 (70.3)	20.8 (69.4)	19.3 (66.7)	18.0 (64.4)	18.1 (64.6)	19.8 (67.6)	21.8 (71.2)	22.4 (72.3)	21.4 (70.5)	21.4 (70.5)	20.6 (69.1)
Mean daily minimum °C (°F)	16.8 (62.2)	16.7 (62.1)	16.5 (61.7)	15.5 (59.9)	13.2 (55.8)	11.2 (52.2)	11.1 (52.0)	12.3 (54.1)	14.9 (58.8)	16.3 (61.3)	16.7 (62.1)	16.9 (62.4)	14.8 (58.6)
Record low °C (°F)	11.2 (52.2)	9.8 (49.6)	11.3 (52.3)	9.6 (49.3)	6.1 (43.0)	4.5 (40.1)	3.0 (37.4)	6.1 (43.0)	9.3 (48.7)	11.2 (52.2)	11.2 (52.2)	10.6 (51.1)	3.0 (37.4)
Average precipitation mm (inches)	210.4 (8.28)	190.2 (7.49)	228.5 (9.00)	116.0 (4.57)	28.3 (1.11)	4.8 (0.19)	0.5 (0.02)	13.1 (0.52)	41.3 (1.63)	122.8 (4.83)	217.5 (8.56)	243.6 (9.59)	1,417 (55.79)
Average precipitation days (≥ 1.0 mm)	17	14	15	8	3	1	0	1	4	10	15	18	106
Average relative humidity (%)	79.4	78.3	80.1	76.5	71.8	65.5	59.4	50.0	51.8	63.3	77.9	80.2	69.5
Mean monthly sunshine hours	161.2	169.6	178.1	213.4	240.5	262.1	276.0	288.8	228.6	197.0	137.1	141.8	2,494.2
Source 1: Instituto Nacional de Meteorologia
Source 2: Meteo Climat (record highs and lows)

There are two distinct types of vegetation zone, one covering the well-drained interfluvial areas and the other in the wetter and more fertile areas along the watercourses. The gallery forests cover about 104 hectares (260 acres) and are rich in species and play an important role in protecting water and wildlife. As of 2004 1,829 species of vascular plant had been collected in the IBGE Ecological Reserve, including 1,503 native species and 326 exotic species. The phanerogamic vegetation has been called "the most diverse arboreal flora of Central Brazil." 18 species of liverworts have been collected, from eight families. The reserve has native grasses such as Tristachya leiostachya, Olyra ciliatifolia and Olyra taquara and several species of micro-orchid.

A number of new species of amphibians and reptiles have been identified on the reserve. In total 101 species of herpetofauna have been found including 37 frogs, 20 lizards and 37 snakes. This may well understate the diversity, particularly of snakes. There are more than 250 species of birds. Two groups of migratory birds frequent the reserve, "winter species" and "spring species", both of which arrive during periods when insects are abundant so food is plentiful. The reserve has diverse wildlife. Some of these are endangered, such as the giant anteater, the maned wolf and the pampas deer. Other rare or endangered species include Brasília tapaculo, a bird, Brasilia lyrefin, a fish, and bush dog, a canid.

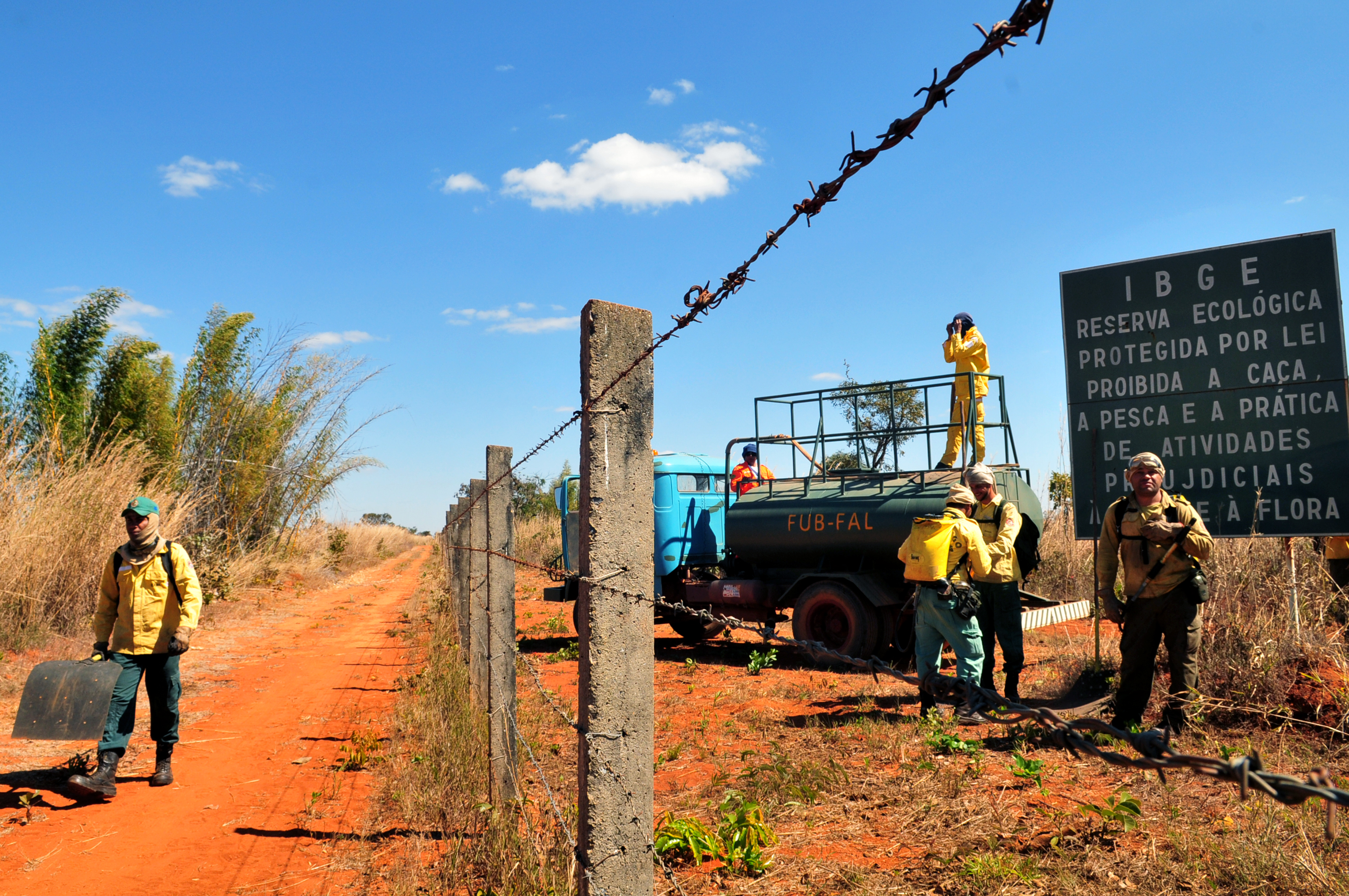
Firefighters

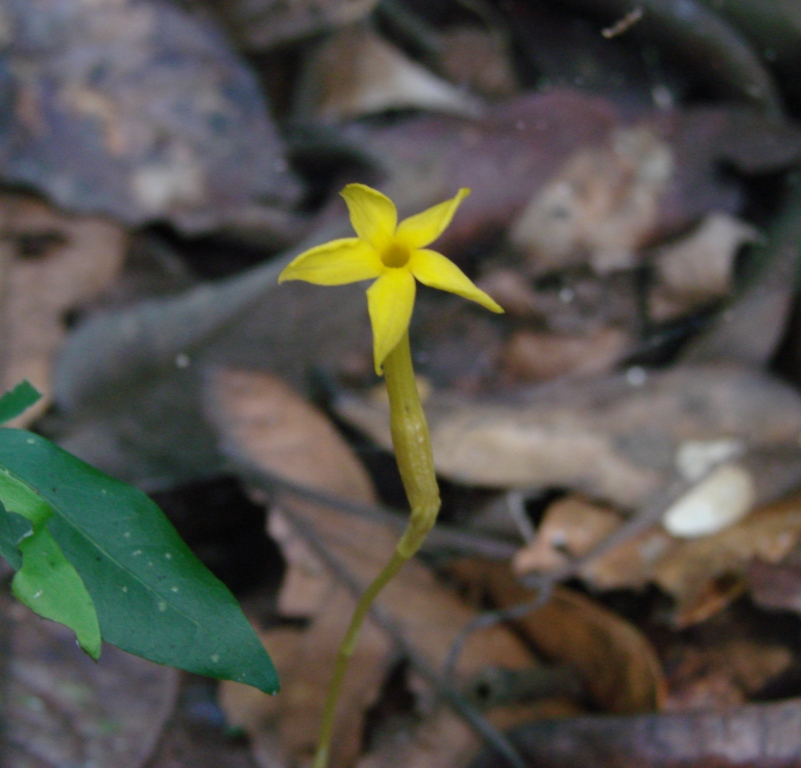
Voyria aphylla - Gentianaceae

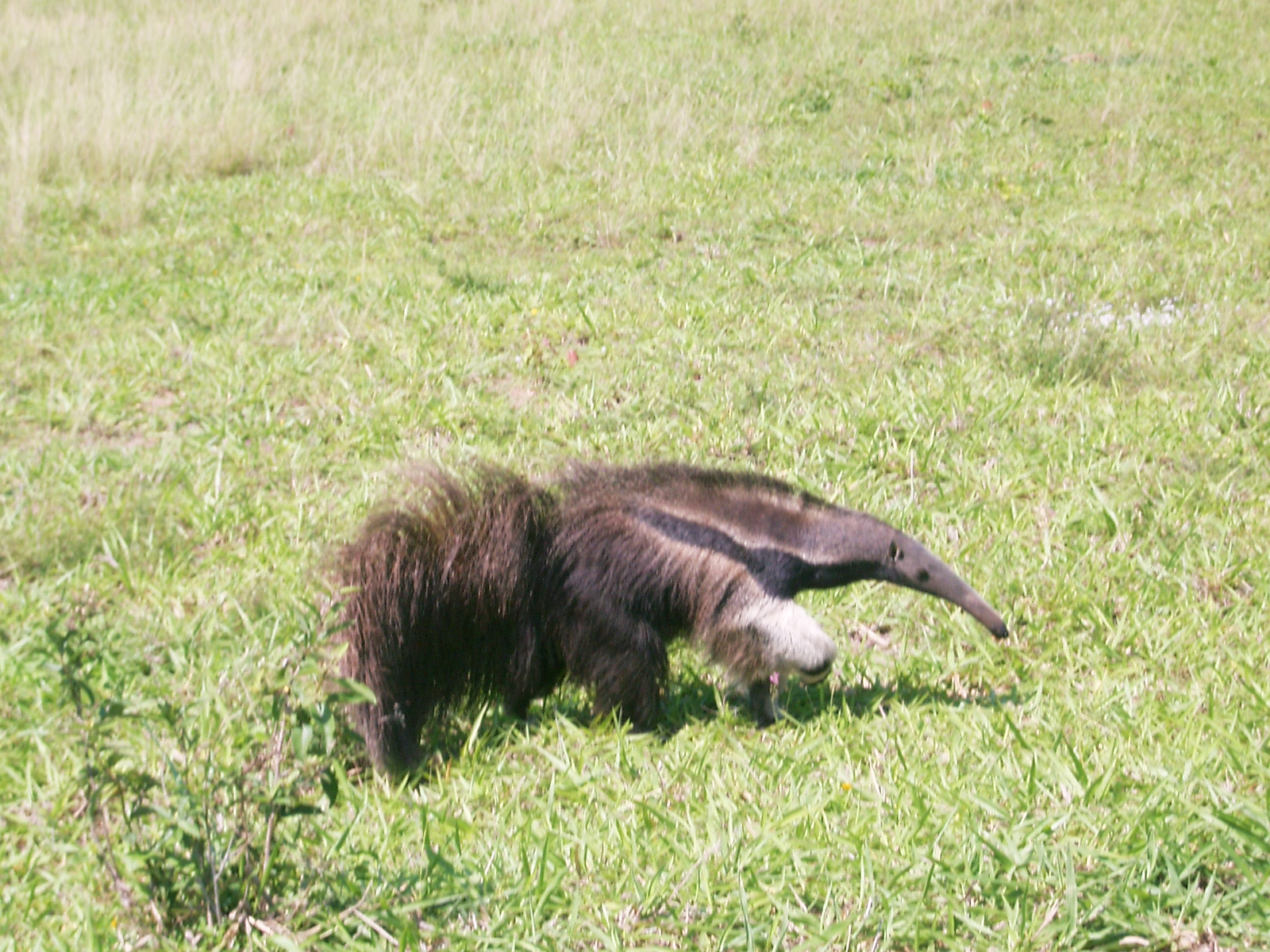
Giant anteater

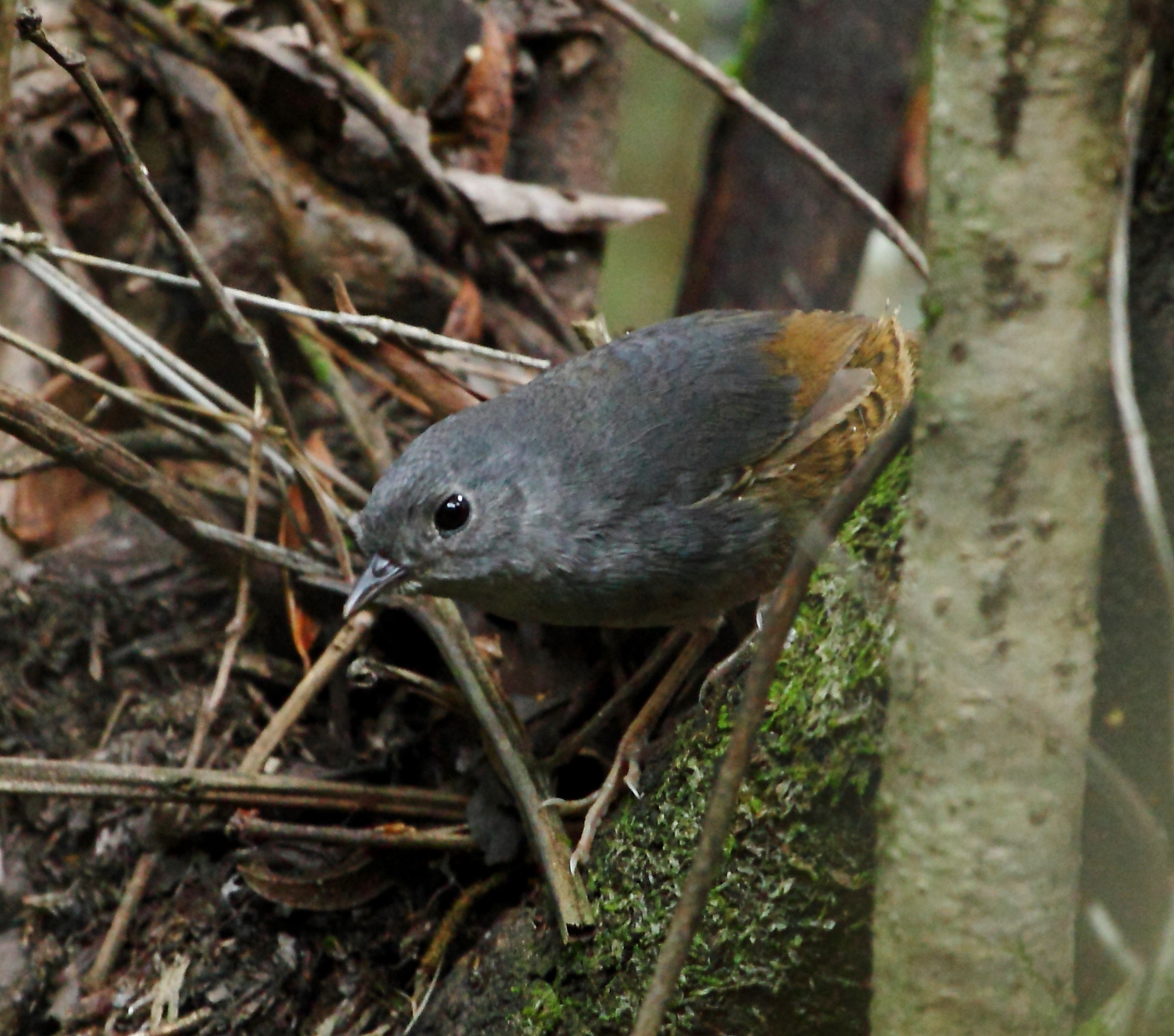
Brasília tapaculo

== Sources ==
- Aguiar Saraiva Câmara, Paulo Eduardo; Pinheiro da Costa, Denise (2006), "Hepáticas e antóceros das matas de galeria da Reserva Ecológica do IBGE, RECOR, Distrito Federal, Brasil" (PDF), Hoehnea (in Portuguese), 33 (1)
- "Áreas de Estudo", Programa Ecológico de Longa Duração (CNPq) - sítio Brasília (in Portuguese), archived from the original on 2012-05-24
- Conheça a RECOR (in Portuguese), RECOR, archived from the original on 2016-04-15
- Gelli, Guido (2004). "Reserva Ecológica do IBGE Ambiente e plantas vasculares" (PDF). IBGE (FTP) (in Portuguese). Rio de Janeiro. (To view documents see Help:FTP)
- Lambert Ribeiro, Mauro (2011), Reserva Ecológica do IBGE: Biodiversidade Terrestre (in Portuguese), Rio de Janeiro: Instituto Brasileiro de Geografia e Estatística, ISBN 978-85-240-4186-0
- Library of Congress (2002), Library of Congress Subject Headings, Library of Congress, Cataloging Distribution Service
- Lineu Schwartz, Deni (3 December 1986), RESOLUÇÃO/CONAMA N.º 27 (in Portuguese)
- Marquete, Ronaldo (2001), "Reserva Ecológica do IBGE (Brasília, DF): Flacourtiaceae" (PDF), Rodriguésia (in Portuguese), 52 (80), archived from the original (PDF) on 2018-11-26
- Negret, Álvaro (1988), "Fluxos migratórios na avifauna da reserva ecológica do IBGE, Brasília, DF, Brasil", Revista Brasileira de Zoologia (in Portuguese), 5 (2), Curitiba, doi:10.1590/s0101-81751988000200005, ISSN 0101-8175
- Nossa história (in Portuguese), RECOR, archived from the original on 2016-04-15
- "Reserva Ecológica do Roncador", Brasil Escola (in Portuguese), Rede Omnia
- "Reserva Ecológica do IBGE", Ecoturismo no Brasil (in Portuguese), archived from the original on 2016-03-15
