= Bokermannohyla napolii =

Scientific classification
- Kingdom: Animalia
- Phylum: Chordata
- Class: Amphibia
- Order: Anura
- Family: Hylidae
- Genus: Bokermannohyla
- Species: B. napolii

Binomial name
- Bokermannohyla napolii Carvalho, Giaretta and Magrini, 2012

Species of frog

Bokermannohyla napolii is a frog in the family Hylidae. It is endemic to southeastern Brazil. Scientists know it only from the type locality, 850 meters above sea level in Minas Gerais.

== Original description ==
- THIAGO RIBEIRO DE CARVALHO; ARIOVALDO ANTONIO GIARETTA; LEANDRO MAGRINI (May 23, 2012). "A new species of the Bokermannohyla circumdata group (Anura: Hylidae) from southeastern Brazil, with bioacoustic data on seven species of the genus". Zootaxa (Abstract). 3321: 37. doi:10.11646/zootaxa.3321.1.3.
