= Bokermannohyla sazimai =

Conservation status
- Data Deficient (IUCN 3.1)

Scientific classification
- Kingdom: Animalia
- Phylum: Chordata
- Class: Amphibia
- Order: Anura
- Family: Hylidae
- Genus: Bokermannohyla
- Species: B. sazimai

Binomial name
- Bokermannohyla sazimai (Cardoso & Andrade, 1982)

Species of frog

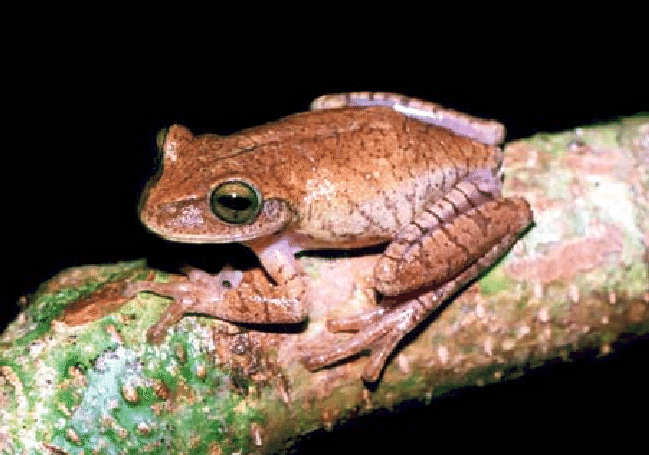

Bokermannohyla sazimai is a species of frog in the family Hylidae. It is endemic to Serra da Canastra National Park and Uberlândia, Brazil. Its natural habitats are subtropical or tropical dry forests, moist savanna, subtropical or tropical moist shrubland, subtropical or tropical high-altitude shrubland, and rivers. It is threatened by habitat loss for agriculture (livestock and crops), logging, fires and construction of dams.
