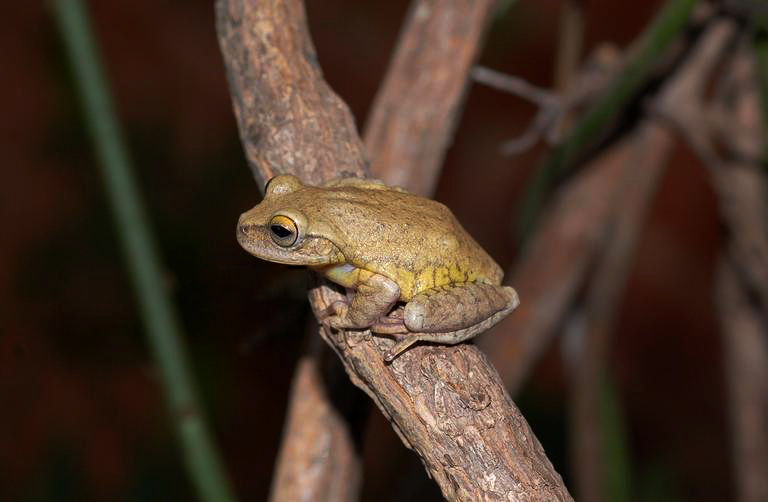

Conservation status
- Data Deficient (IUCN 3.1)

Scientific classification
- Kingdom: Animalia
- Phylum: Chordata
- Class: Amphibia
- Order: Anura
- Family: Hylidae
- Genus: Bokermannohyla
- Species: B. ibitiguara

Binomial name
- Bokermannohyla ibitiguara (Cardoso, 1983)

= Bokermannohyla ibitiguara =

Species of frog

Bokermannohyla ibitiguara is a species of frog in the family Hylidae. It is endemic to Alpinópolis and Serra da Canastra, Brazil. Its natural habitats are moist savanna and rivers. It is threatened by habitat loss for agriculture, human settlement, tourism and fires.
