= Bokermannohyla oxente =

Conservation status
- Least Concern (IUCN 3.1)

Scientific classification
- Kingdom: Animalia
- Phylum: Chordata
- Class: Amphibia
- Order: Anura
- Family: Hylidae
- Genus: Bokermannohyla
- Species: B. oxente

Binomial name
- Bokermannohyla oxente Lugli & Haddad, 2006

Species of amphibian

Bokermannohyla oxente is a species of frogs in the family Hylidae. It is endemic to Bahia state, Brazil.

Bokermannohyla oxente is a nocturnal species. These frogs live close to stream in riparian vegetation. Males are territorial and call throughout the year.
