= Bokermannohyla flavopicta =

Scientific classification
- Kingdom: Animalia
- Phylum: Chordata
- Class: Amphibia
- Order: Anura
- Family: Hylidae
- Genus: Bokermannohyla
- Species: B. flavopicta

Binomial name
- Bokermannohyla flavopicta Leite, Pezzuti, and Garcia, 2012

Synonyms
- Bokermannohyla napolii Leite, Pezzuti, and Garcia, 2012

Species of amphibian

Bokermannohyla flavopicta is a frog in the family Hylidae endemic to southeastern Brazil. Scientists have seen it exclusively over 1500 meters above sea level.

The adult male frog measures 51.9–65.3 mm in snout-vent length and the adult female frog 60.2–61.6 mm. The skin on the dorsum has a gray or brown background with darker brown irregular marks. It has small yellow spots on its lips, face, flanks, front and hind legs, front and hind feet, and cloacal area.
