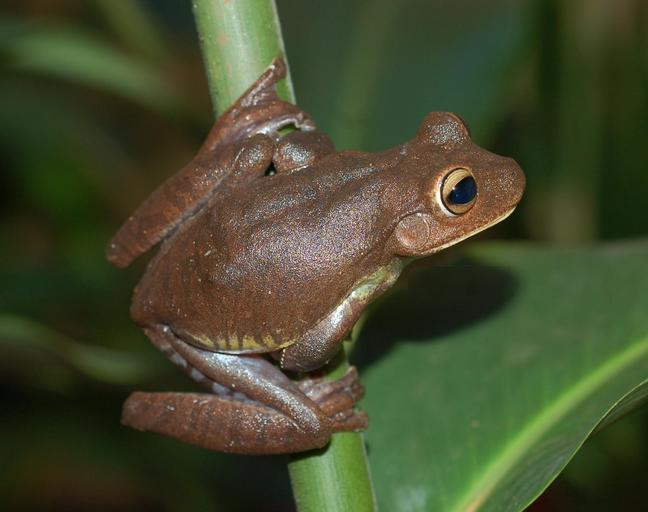

Conservation status
- Endangered (IUCN 3.1)

Scientific classification
- Kingdom: Animalia
- Phylum: Chordata
- Class: Amphibia
- Order: Anura
- Family: Hylidae
- Genus: Bokermannohyla
- Species: B. vulcaniae

Binomial name
- Bokermannohyla vulcaniae (de Vasconcelos & Giaretta, 2005)

Synonyms
- Hyla vulcaniae de Vasconcelos & Giaretta, "2003" 2005

= Bokermannohyla vulcaniae =

Species of amphibian

Bokermannohyla vulcaniae is a species of frogs in the family Hylidae. It is endemic to Brazil and only known from the region of its type locality in Poços de Caldas, Minas Gerais state. The specific name vulcaniae refers to the volcanic origin of the area of the type locality.

== Description ==
Bokermannohyla vulcaniae is a medium-sized tree frog, about 40–53 mm (1.6–2.1 in) in snout–vent length. It has brown dorsum, becoming paler ventrally. The snout is rounded. The tympanum is distinct and the supratympanic fold is well-defined. The fingers and toes are webbed and bear terminal discs; the toes are more heavily webbed than the fingers but bear smaller discs.

The male advertisement call consists of two pulsed notes emitted together or separately. The first note has fewer pulses (average: 4.5 pulses) and a lower dominant frequency (840 Hz) than the second one (respectively 10 pulses and 1240 Hz).

Tadpoles of Gosner stages 26–27 measure 29–38 mm (1.1–1.5 in) in total length, of which the body makes 10–13 mm (0.4–0.5 in).

== Habitat ==
Bokermannohyla vulcaniae are known from a gallery forest adjacent to a stream at about 1,000 m (3,300 ft) above sea level (the type locality) and in a temporary swamp at the forest edge at 1,248 m (4,094 ft) asl. In both places, specimens were found in vegetation 0.65–1.5 m (2–5 ft) above the ground.

== Conservation status ==
The species was assessed as "endangered" by IUCN in 2023 due to its declining population and small known distribution. The species is especially threatened by agricultural and urban runoff as well as habitat loss related to agricultural and mining activities in the area. Two populations in conservation areas have been found (in the Serra de São Domingos Municipal Park and the Botanical Garden of Poços de Caldas).
