= Bokermannohyla pseudopseudis =

Conservation status
- Least Concern (IUCN 3.1)

Scientific classification
- Kingdom: Animalia
- Phylum: Chordata
- Class: Amphibia
- Order: Anura
- Family: Hylidae
- Genus: Bokermannohyla
- Species: B. pseudopseudis

Binomial name
- Bokermannohyla pseudopseudis (Miranda-Ribeiro, 1937)

Synonyms
- Hyla pseudopseudis Miranda-Ribeiro, 1937

Species of amphibian

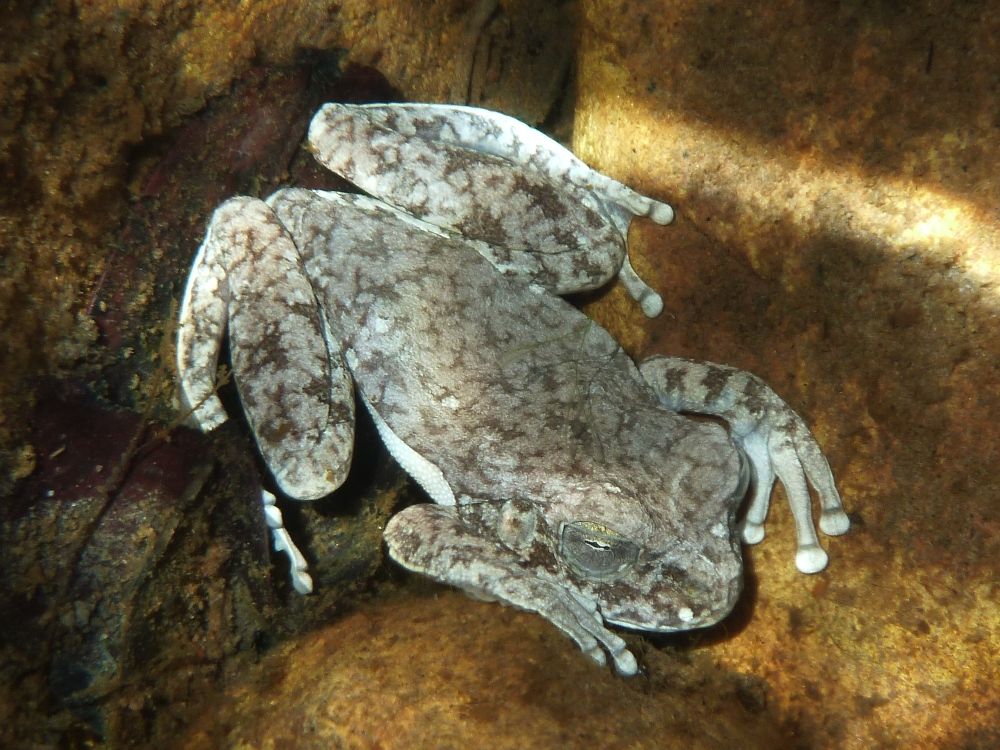
Bokermannohyla pseudopseudis underwater photo in a tributary stream of the River Plate.

Bokermannohyla pseudopseudis is a species of frogs in the family Hylidae. It is endemic to Brazil and is found in the northern Goiás state and the Federal District. It is sometimes known as the Veadeiros waterfall frog or Veadeiros treefrog.

== Description ==
Adult males measure on average 53 mm (2.1 in) and females 50 mm (2.0 in) in snout–vent length. Thus, the species shows male-biased sexual size dimorphism, which is uncommon among frogs. In addition, males have well-developed pre-pollexes and more robust forearms than females.

== Ecology and behavior ==
Bokermannohyla pseudopseudis is a saxicolous species. It is a generalist, with the diet consists of various arthropods, with spiders, beetles, and cockroaches being the most important food items. There is some evidence to suggests that females are more choosy in their diet than males.

Bokermannohyla pseudopseudis have a limited ability to perch on vegetation. The males call from rocks in the riverbed, often near waterfalls. Calling males and tadpoles have been found through the year, suggesting that breeding activity is prolonged in this species. Males often have scratch marks on their backs and heads, suggesting male-male combats.

== Habitat and conservation status ==
The species' natural habitats are rocky streams in the Cerrado. It occurs in rock crevices and calls from rock outcrops in the riverbed. The tadpoles occur in pools within deep sections of permanent streams and attach themselves to stones on the stream bottom.

Its habitat is threatened by agriculture, logging, and dam construction, although the species is not classified as threatened. It is listed in the IUCN Red List as a species of least concern.
