= Bokermannohyla sagarana =

Conservation status
- Endangered (IUCN 3.1)

Scientific classification
- Kingdom: Animalia
- Phylum: Chordata
- Class: Amphibia
- Order: Anura
- Family: Hylidae
- Genus: Bokermannohyla
- Species: B. sagarana

Binomial name
- Bokermannohyla sagarana Leite, Pezzuti and Drummond, 2011

Species of amphibian

Bokermannohyla sagarana is a species of frog in the family Hylidae. It is endemic to the Espinhaço Mountains in the state of Minas Gerais, southeastern Brazil. Its specific name refers to the novel Sagarana by João Guimarães Rosa.

== Description ==
Adult males measure 47–55 mm (1.9–2.2 in) and adult females – based on two specimens only – 45–49 mm (1.8–1.9 in) in snout–vent length. The snout is short and truncate. The eyes are prominent. The tympanum is distinct, only slightly covered by the supratympanic fold. The skin of the dorsum is gray in color with dark gray blotches on a light gray background, giving the appearance of lichen on rock. The forearms are hypertrophied. The fingers have basal webbing and bear elliptical discs at their tips. The hind legs are light in color with strikingly dark bars across. The toes are partially webbed and bear small terminal discs. Males have a single subgular vocal sac.

== Habitat and conservation ==
Bokermannohyla sagarana occurs on rocky mountain meadows (campo rupestre) at elevations of 1,180–1,225 m (3,871–4,019 ft) above sea level. The adults are nocturnal and are often found near small temporary rocky streams and wet rock outcrops and in gallery forests of permanent streams.

The species is common but its range is small and fragmented. It is threatened by habitat loss and fragmentation caused by forest plantantions. It receives some degree of protection from the Serra do Cabral State Park.
