= Bokermannohyla gouveai =

Conservation status
- Data Deficient (IUCN 3.1)

Scientific classification
- Kingdom: Animalia
- Phylum: Chordata
- Class: Amphibia
- Order: Anura
- Family: Hylidae
- Genus: Bokermannohyla
- Species: B. gouveai

Binomial name
- Bokermannohyla gouveai (Cruz & Peixoto, 1992)

Species of frog

Bokermannohyla gouveai is a species of frog in the family Hylidae. It is endemic to Itatiaia National Park, Brazil. Its natural habitats are subtropical or tropical moist montane forests, subtropical or tropical high-altitude shrubland, rivers, and pastureland. It is threatened by habitat loss for logging and agriculture.
