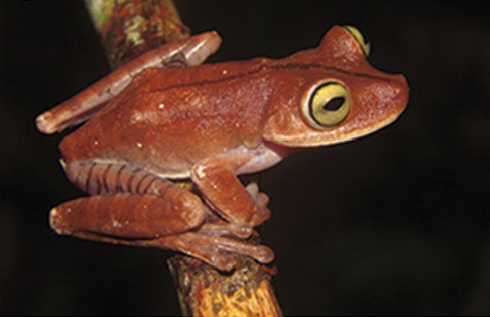

Scientific classification
- Kingdom: Animalia
- Phylum: Chordata
- Class: Amphibia
- Order: Anura
- Family: Hylidae
- Genus: Bokermannohyla
- Species: B. capra

Binomial name
- Bokermannohyla capra Napoli and Pimenta, 2009

= Bokermannohyla capra =

Species of frog

Bokermannohyla capra is a species of frog in the family Hylidae. It is endemic to the Atlantic forests in Bahia, Brazil.

== Description ==
- Napoli ME; Pimenta BVS (2009). "A new species of the Bokermannohyhla circumdata group (Anura: Hylidae) from the coastal forests of Bahia, northeastern Brazil". Copeia. 2009 (4): 674–683. doi:10.1643/CH-08-224. S2CID 83631224.
