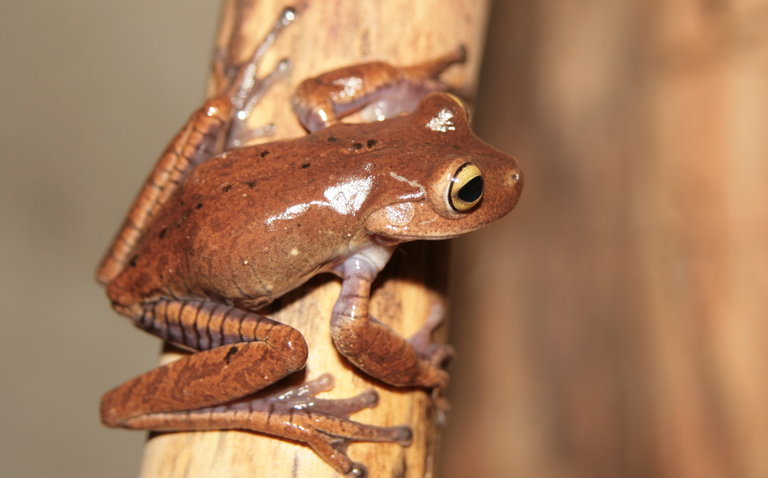

Conservation status
- Data Deficient (IUCN 3.1)

Scientific classification
- Kingdom: Animalia
- Phylum: Chordata
- Class: Amphibia
- Order: Anura
- Family: Hylidae
- Genus: Bokermannohyla
- Species: B. ahenea

Binomial name
- Bokermannohyla ahenea (Napoli and Caramaschi, 2004)

Synonyms
- Hyla ahenea Napoli and Caramaschi, 2004

= Bokermannohyla ahenea =

Species of amphibian

Bokermannohyla ahenea is a species of frogs in the family Hylidae. It is endemic to the Serra do Mar in São Paulo, Brazil. Its natural habitat is montane forest. While thought not to be rare, it is threatened by habitat loss caused by cattle pasture and agriculture including sugar, coffee and exotic trees. It has been recorded from the Serra da Bocaina National Park.
