= Bokermannohyla caramaschii =

Conservation status
- Least Concern (IUCN 3.1)

Scientific classification
- Kingdom: Animalia
- Phylum: Chordata
- Class: Amphibia
- Order: Anura
- Family: Hylidae
- Genus: Bokermannohyla
- Species: B. caramaschii

Binomial name
- Bokermannohyla caramaschii (Napoli, 2005)

Species of amphibian

Bokermannohyla caramaschii is a species of frogs in the family Hylidae.

It is endemic to Brazil. Its natural habitats are subtropical or tropical moist lowland forests and rivers. It is threatened by habitat loss.
