= Bokermannohyla juiju =

Scientific classification
- Kingdom: Animalia
- Phylum: Chordata
- Class: Amphibia
- Order: Anura
- Family: Hylidae
- Genus: Bokermannohyla
- Species: B. juiju

Binomial name
- Bokermannohyla juiju Faivovich, Lugli, Lourenço & Haddad, 2009

Species of frog

Bokermannohyla juiju is a frog in the family Hylidae. It is endemic to Bahia, Brazil.

This frog has a more slender body than other frogs in its species group and lacks the dark transverse bars on its limbs. It is the first frog in the genus Bokermannohyla to be reported to have a mental gland.
