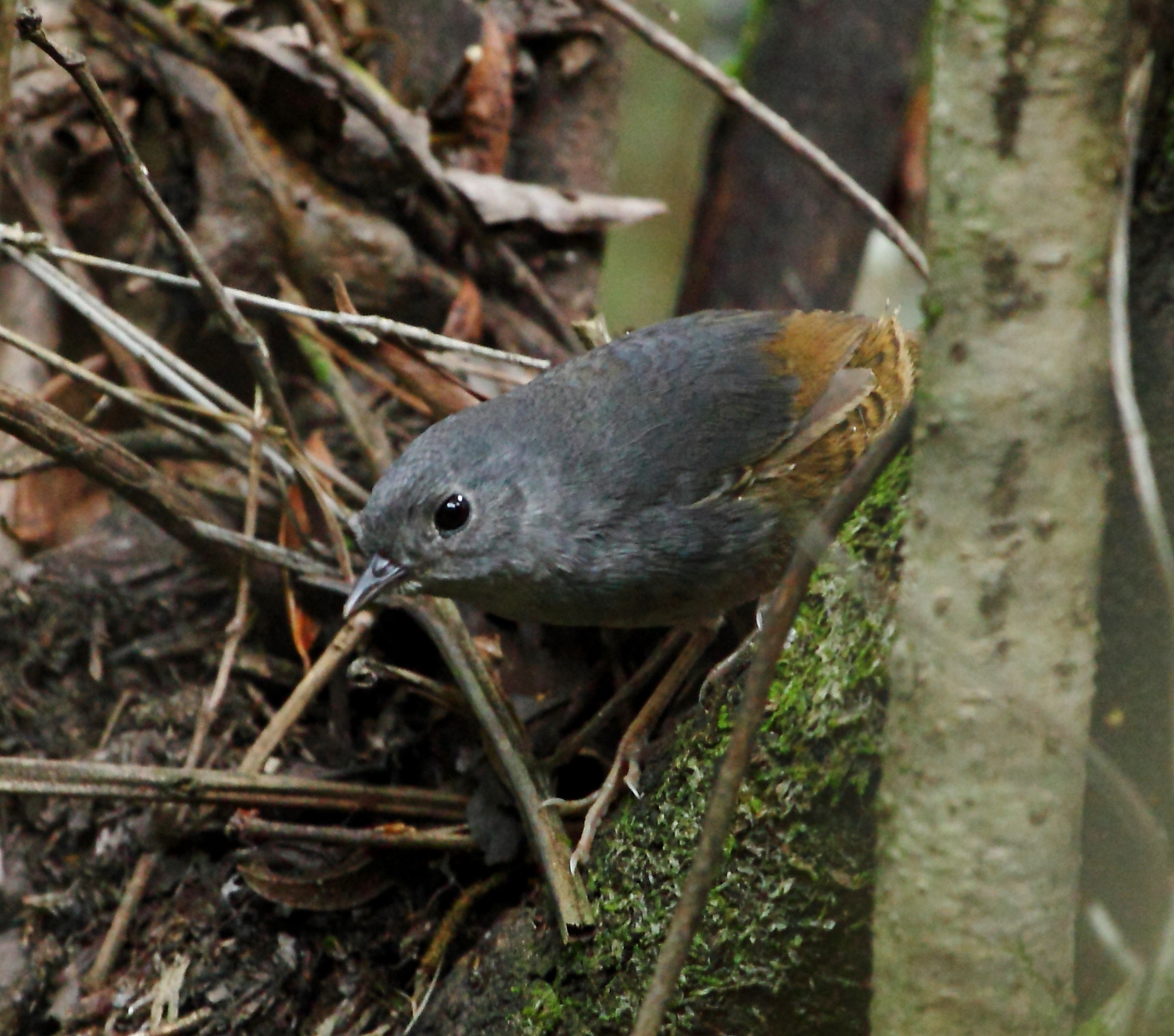

Conservation status
- Endangered (IUCN 3.1)

Scientific classification
- Kingdom: Animalia
- Phylum: Chordata
- Class: Aves
- Order: Passeriformes
- Family: Rhinocryptidae
- Genus: Scytalopus
- Species: S. novacapitalis

Binomial name
- Scytalopus novacapitalis Sick, 1958

= Brasília tapaculo =

Species of bird

The Brasília tapaculo (Scytalopus novacapitalis) is a species of bird in the family Rhinocryptidae. It is endemic to southern Brazil.

== Taxonomy and systematics ==
The Brasília tapaculo is most closely related to the Planalto tapaculo (Scytalopus pachecoi). Those two species, rock tapaculo (S. petrophilus), and Diamantina tapaculo (S. diamantinensis) form a clade. It was originally thought to be closely related to the white-breasted tapaculo (Eleoscytalopus indigoticus).

== Description ==
The Brasília tapaculo is 11 cm (4.3 in) long. One male weighed 19.2 g (0.68 oz) and two unsexed specimens weighed 15.6 and 18.6 g (0.55 and 0.66 oz). The adult is blue-gray above and whitish to pale gray below. The lower back and rump are reddish brown and the vent is rufous with gray barring. The juvenile has not been described.

== Distribution and habitat ==
The Brasília tapaculo is found in disjunct areas in eastern Goiás, the Distrito Federal, and western Minas Gerais. It inhabits gallery forest, primarily permanently flooded areas with Blechnum ferns and Euterpe palms. It has a fairly narrow elevational range of 800 to 1,000 m (2,600 to 3,300 ft).

== Behavior ==
=== Feeding ===
The Brasília tapaculo forages on the ground for insects, spiders, and centipedes.

=== Breeding ===
The only information on the Brasília tapaculo's breeding phenology is that a specimen collected in July had active gonads.

=== Vocalization ===
The Brazilia tapaculo's song is an "ewk" note repeated for up to a minute . Its alarm call is a series of sharp "che-te-te" notes. Another call is a fast series of "chip" notes that increase in volume.

== Status ==
The IUCN has assessed the Brasília tapaculo as Endangered. Its range of approximately 72 km^{2} (28 mi^{2}) is greatly fragmented and under continued threat of degradation. It does, however, occur in at least six protected areas.
