= Bokermannohyla carvalhoi =

Conservation status
- Least Concern (IUCN 3.1)

Scientific classification
- Kingdom: Animalia
- Phylum: Chordata
- Class: Amphibia
- Order: Anura
- Family: Hylidae
- Genus: Bokermannohyla
- Species: B. carvalhoi

Binomial name
- Bokermannohyla carvalhoi (Peixoto, 1981)

Species of frog

Bokermannohyla carvalhoi is a species of frog in the family Hylidae. It is endemic to Brazil. Its natural habitats are subtropical or tropical moist montane forests and rivers. It is threatened by habitat loss, due to deforestation.
