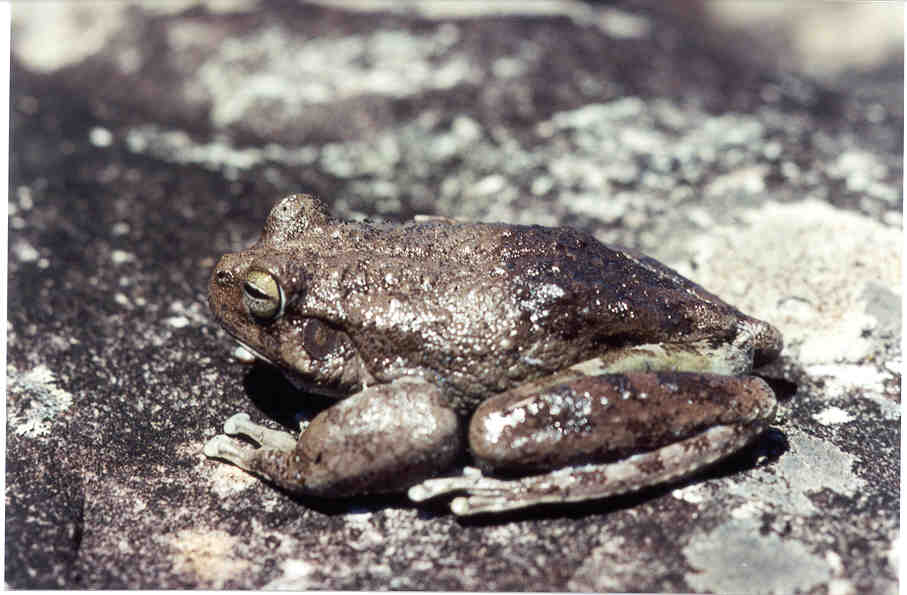

Conservation status
- Least Concern (IUCN 3.1)

Scientific classification
- Kingdom: Animalia
- Phylum: Chordata
- Class: Amphibia
- Order: Anura
- Family: Hylidae
- Genus: Bokermannohyla
- Species: B. alvarengai

Binomial name
- Bokermannohyla alvarengai (Bokermann, 1956)

= Bokermannohyla alvarengai =

Species of amphibian

Bokermannohyla alvarengai is a species of frogs in the family Hylidae.

== Distribution and status ==
It is endemic to Brazil. Its natural habitats are subtropical or tropical high-altitude grassland, rivers, and rocky areas. It is threatened by habitat loss.

== Temperature regulation ==
Bokermannohyla alvarengai is able to lighten its skin colour when hot (and darken when cold), making the skin reflect more heat and so avoid overheating.
