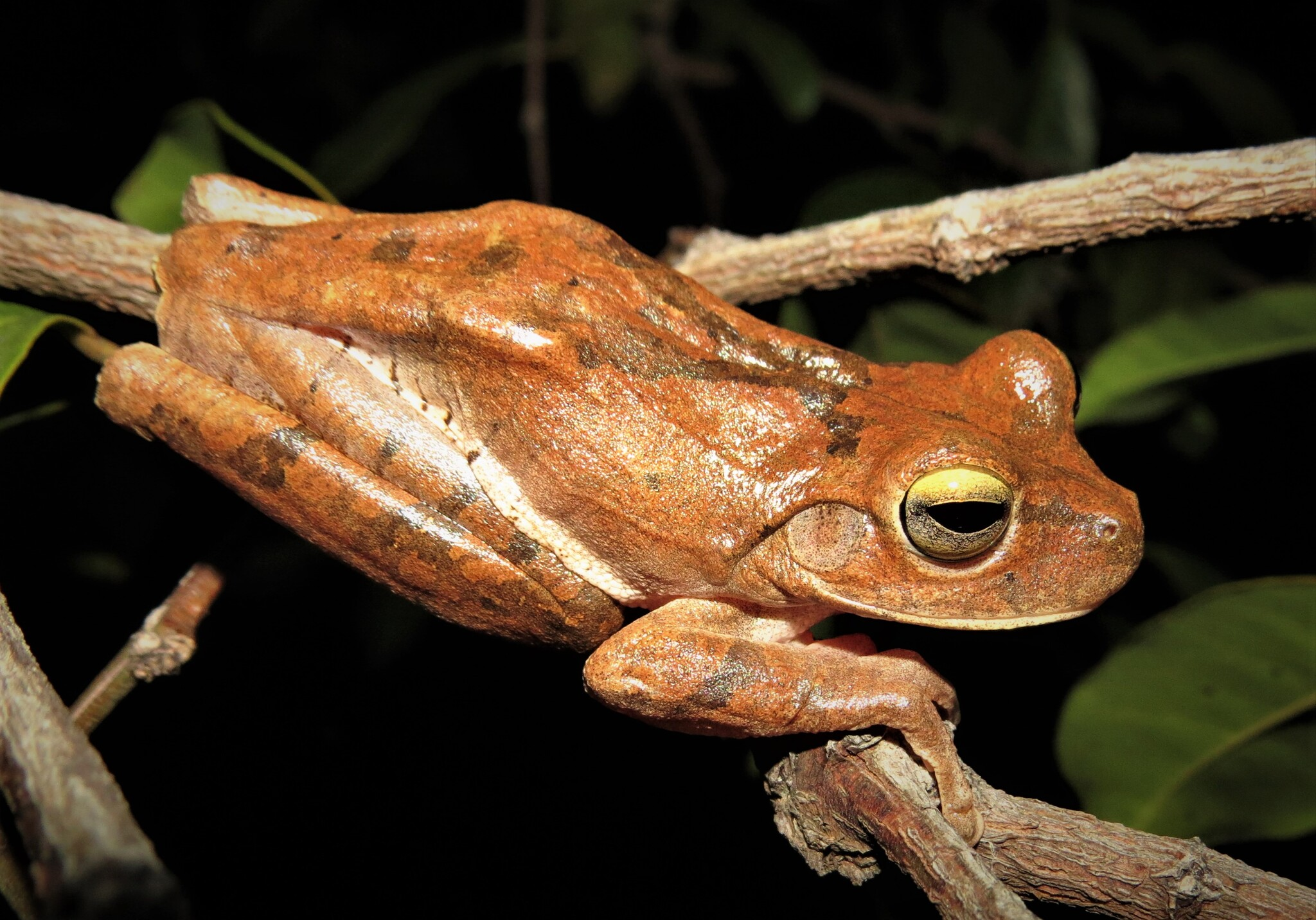

Conservation status
- Least Concern (IUCN 3.1)

Scientific classification
- Kingdom: Animalia
- Phylum: Chordata
- Class: Amphibia
- Order: Anura
- Family: Hylidae
- Genus: Bokermannohyla
- Species: B. diamantina

Binomial name
- Bokermannohyla diamantina Napoli & Juncá, 2006

= Bokermannohyla diamantina =

Species of amphibian

Bokermannohyla diamantina is a species of frog in the family Hylidae. It is endemic to Brazil.
