= Bokermannohyla ravida =

Conservation status
- Critically Endangered (IUCN 3.1)

Scientific classification
- Kingdom: Animalia
- Phylum: Chordata
- Class: Amphibia
- Order: Anura
- Family: Hylidae
- Genus: Bokermannohyla
- Species: B. ravida

Binomial name
- Bokermannohyla ravida (Caramaschi, Napoli & Bernardes, 2001)

Species of amphibian

Bokermannohyla ravida is a species of frogs in the family Hylidae.

It is endemic to Presidente Olegário, Brazil. Its natural habitats are subtropical or tropical dry forests, moist savanna, subtropical or tropical moist shrubland, and rivers. It is threatened by habitat loss for agriculture (crops and livestock), logging and agricultural pollution.
