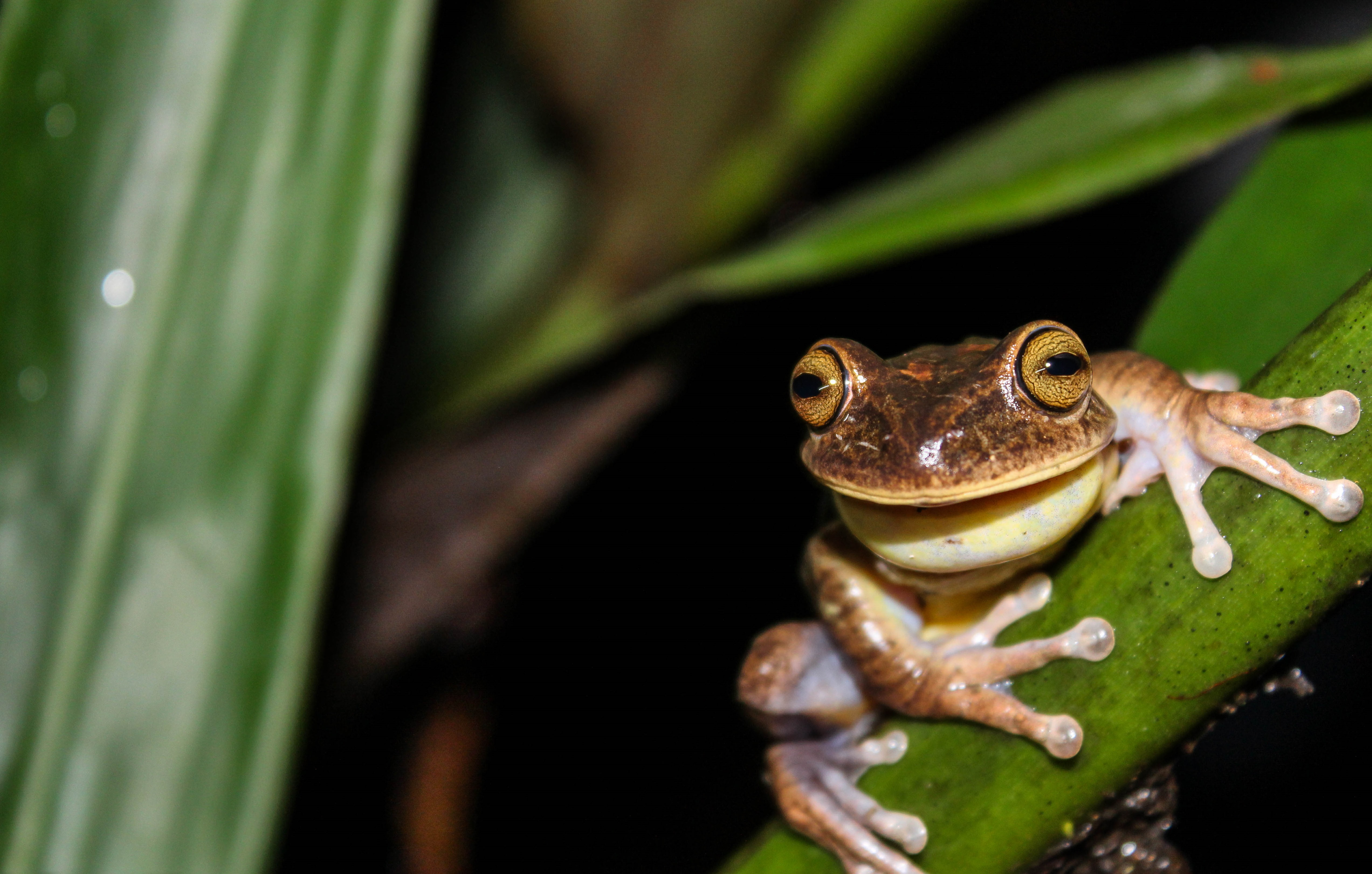

Conservation status
- Least Concern (IUCN 3.1)

Scientific classification
- Kingdom: Animalia
- Phylum: Chordata
- Class: Amphibia
- Order: Anura
- Family: Hylidae
- Genus: Bokermannohyla
- Species: B. luctuosa

Binomial name
- Bokermannohyla luctuosa (Pombal & Haddad, 1993)

= Bokermannohyla luctuosa =

Species of frog

Bokermannohyla luctuosa is a species of frog in the family Hylidae. It is endemic to Brazil. Its natural habitats are subtropical or tropical moist lowland forests and rivers. It is threatened by habitat loss.
