= Boana clepsydra =

Conservation status
- Critically Endangered (IUCN 3.1)

Scientific classification
- Kingdom: Animalia
- Phylum: Chordata
- Class: Amphibia
- Order: Anura
- Family: Hylidae
- Genus: Boana
- Species: B. clepsydra

Binomial name
- Boana clepsydra (A. Lutz, 1925)

Synonyms
- Hyla clepsydra Lutz, 1925; Bokermannohyla clepsydra Faivovich, Haddad, Garcia, Frost, Campbell, and Wheeler, 2005

Species of amphibian

Boana clepsydra, commonly called the São Paulo treefrog, is a species of frogs in the family Hylidae.

It is endemic to Serra da Bocaina National Park and Rio de Janeiro, Brazil. Its natural habitats are subtropical or tropical moist lowland forests and rivers. It is known only from a few specimens so it is not well known.
