= Boana claresignata =

Conservation status
- Critically Endangered (IUCN 3.1)

Scientific classification
- Kingdom: Animalia
- Phylum: Chordata
- Class: Amphibia
- Order: Anura
- Family: Hylidae
- Genus: Boana
- Species: B. claresignata

Binomial name
- Boana claresignata (A. Lutz & B. Lutz, 1939)

Synonyms
- Hyla claresignata Lutz and Lutz, 1939; Bokermannohyla claresignata Faivovich, Haddad, Garcia, Frost, Campbell, and Wheeler, 2005

Species of frog

Boana claresignata is a species of frog in the family Hylidae. It is endemic to Serra do Mar, Brazil.

== Habitat ==
These frogs live in primary and secondary forest. Adult frogs live near epiphytic bromeliad plants. Scientists have seen this frog between 650 and 1,200 m (2,130 and 3,940 ft) above sea level and have reported it in one protected park, Parque Nacional Serra dos Órgãos.

== Reproduction ==
Scientists have seen the tadpoles in rocky mountain streams with fast-moving water and the adult frogs near bromeliads, but they do not know where the adult frog places its eggs.

== Threats ==
The IUCN classifies this species as critically endangered, with no more than an estimated fifty adult frogs alive at any time. Scientists do not the cause of the species' decline. The area was subject to considerable deforestation before the twentieth century, but scientists have not found the frog in many of the suitable forest habitats nearby. The dangerous fungus Batrachochytrium dendrobatidis came to Serra do Mar in the 1970s or 1980s, so chytridiomycosis may be the culprit.
