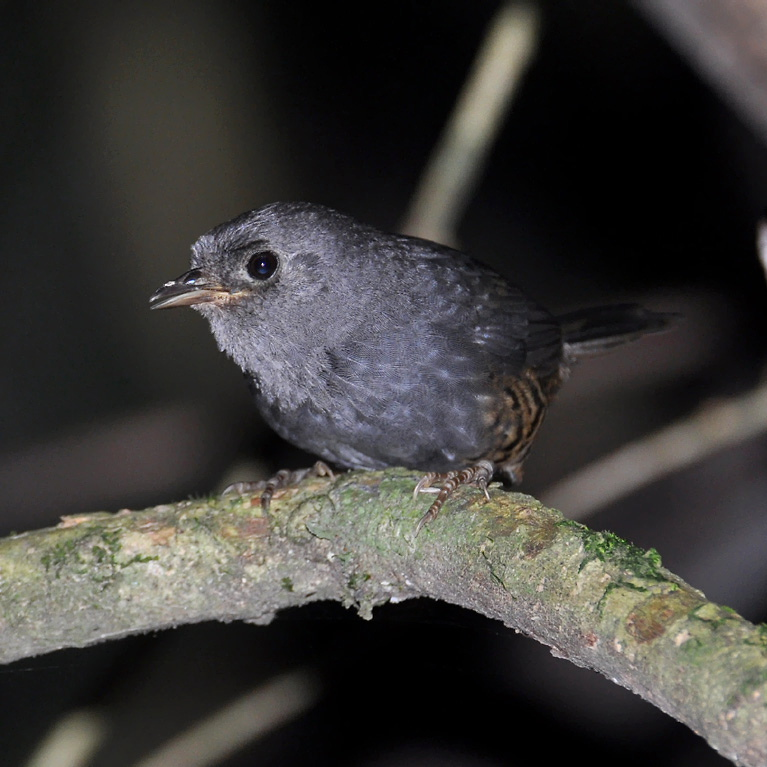

Conservation status
- Least Concern (IUCN 3.1)

Scientific classification
- Kingdom: Animalia
- Phylum: Chordata
- Class: Aves
- Order: Passeriformes
- Family: Rhinocryptidae
- Genus: Scytalopus
- Species: S. pachecoi

Binomial name
- Scytalopus pachecoi Maurício, 2005

= Planalto tapaculo =

Species of bird

The Planalto tapaculo (Scytalopus pachecoi) is a small passerine bird in family Rhinocryptidae. It is found in southeastern Brazil and extreme northeastern Argentina.

== Taxonomy and systematics ==
The Planalto tapaculos was previously included in the mouse-colored tapaculo (Scytalopus speluncae) but was described as a new species in 2005 based on differences in plumage and vocalizations. Its specific epithet honors Fernando Pacheco, a Brazilian ornithologist.

== Description ==
The Planalto tapaculo is about 12 cm (4.7 in) long and weighs about 15 g (0.53 oz). The male's upperparts are mainly dark gray and the underparts paler gray. The flanks are buff with dark bars, which differentiate it from the similar but unbarred mouse-colored tapaculo. The female is browner and the juvenile has not been described.

== Distribution and habitat ==
The Planalto tapaculo is known from southern Brazil (several parts of Rio Grande do Sul and southeastern Santa Catarina) and extreme northeast Misiones Province of Argentina. It inhabits forest and forest edge where it is often found near streams and in undergrowth such as bamboo thickets. It has been found at higher densities in secondary forest than in undisturbed forest. It ranges up to 1,500 m (4,900 ft) elevation.

== Behavior ==
=== Feeding ===
The Planalto tapaculo forages for arthropods in the forest understory, primarily in thickets of terrestrial bromeliads and bamboo.

=== Breeding ===
Almost nothing is known about the Planalto tapaculo's breeding phenology. A nest found in September in Argentina was not described but contained two eggs.

=== Vocalization ===
The Planalto tapaculo's song contains a long series of notes starting at a rate of two or three per second and accelerating into a trill . This compares to five notes per second in the faster song of the mouse-colored tapaculo. The Planalto tapaculo has a distinctive, monosyllabic contact call and a loud alarm call.

== Status ==
The IUCN has assessed the Planalto tapaculo as being of Least Concern. Though it has a fairly small and scattered distribution, it occurs in several protected areas and reaches its highest density in second growth and disturbed forest.
