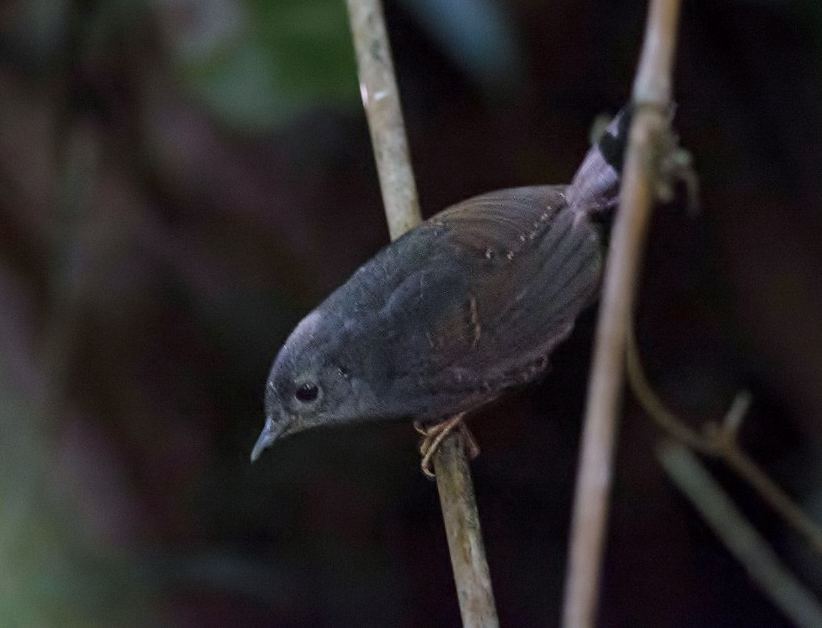
- at Chapada Diamantina, Bahia, Brazil

Conservation status
- Endangered (IUCN 3.1)

Scientific classification
- Kingdom: Animalia
- Phylum: Chordata
- Class: Aves
- Order: Passeriformes
- Family: Rhinocryptidae
- Genus: Scytalopus
- Species: S. diamantinensis

Binomial name
- Scytalopus diamantinensis Bornschein, Maurício, Belmonte-Lopes, Mata & Bonatto, 2007

= Diamantina tapaculo =

Species of bird

The Diamantina tapaculo (Scytalopus diamantinensis) is a species of bird in the family Rhinocryptidae. It is endemic to northeastern Brazil.

== Taxonomy and systematics ==
The Diamantina tapaculo was described as a new species in 2007. At that time it was thought to be closely related to the Planalto tapaculo (Scytalopus pachecoi), and the South American Classification Committee of the American Ornithological Society (AOS) and the Clements taxonomy have agreed. However, the International Ornithological Congress (IOC) has not accepted that placement.

== Description ==
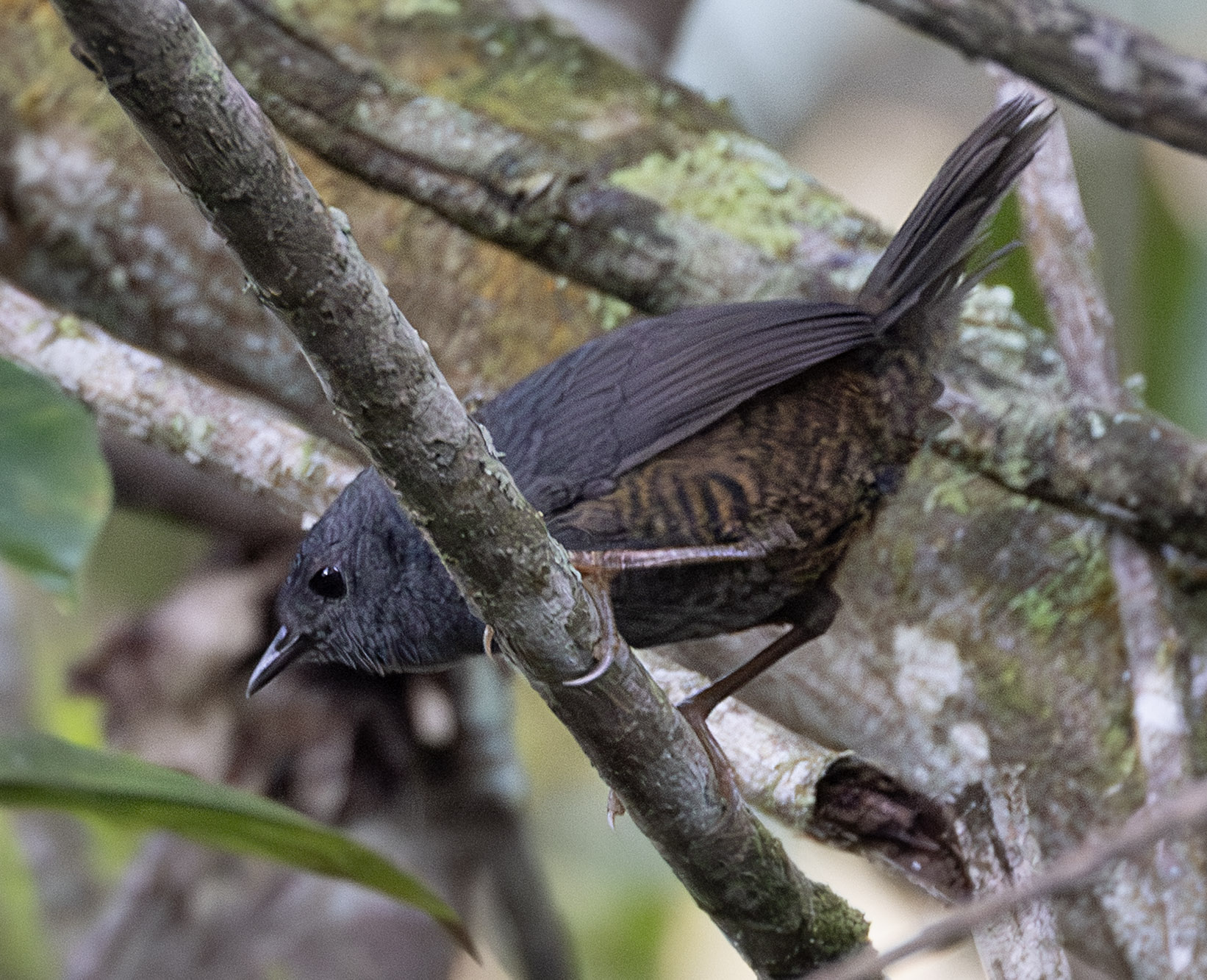

The Diamantina tapaculo is approximately 10 to 11 cm (3.9 to 4.3 in) long and weighs approximately 15 g (0.53 oz). The adult's plumage is identical to that of the Planalto tapaculo. The male's upperparts are mainly dark gray and the underparts paler gray. The flanks are buff with dark bars, which differentiate it from the similar but unbarred mouse-colored tapaculo. The female is browner.

== Distribution and habitat ==
The Diamantina tapaculo is found only in the Chapada Diamantina in Brazil's Bahia state. It inhabits some of the remaining patches of dense forest in a region otherwise characterized by campo rupestre, a biome of grassland and rocky outcrops. In elevation it ranges from 850 to 1,600 m (2,790 to 5,250 ft).

== Behavior ==
=== Feeding ===
No information has been published about the Diamantina tapaculo's diet or foraging phenology.

=== Breeding ===
Virtually nothing is known about the Diamantina tapaculo's breeding behavior. One nest has been described; it was a bowl of grasses in a rock crevice. The two nestlings were fed by both adults.

=== Vocalization ===
The Diamantina tapaculo's song is a simple note, quickly repeated, often for more than a minute. Its call is unique, described as "a single 'tcheep' note".

== Status ==
The IUCN has assessed the Diamantina tapaculo as Endangered because "[it] has a very small range with fewer than five locations and its habitat is declining owing to the replacement of natural vegetation by coffee and banana plantations, collection of firewood for domestic and industrial use and unregulated tourism."
