= Werner Bokermann =

Brazilian zoologist (1929–1995)

Werner Carlos Augusto Bokermann (4 July 1929 - 1 April 1995) was a Brazilian zoologist who specialized in herpetology and ornithology. He collected and described numerous new species.

== Life ==
Bokermann was born in the city of Botucatu, in the interior of São Paulo, in 1929. He was the son of Werner Bokermann and Lauiz Stricker. After schooling at Botucatu he became an assistant in the department of zoology under the agriculture department. He then headed the herpetology department with the secretary being the ornithologist Hélío Ferraz de Almeida Camargo (1922-2006). He worked along with Paulo Vanzolini (1924-2013) and served as curator for the amphibia until 1993. He published nearly 83 papers, describing nearly 70 new species. He maintained a private collection from 1956 and received a Guggenheim fellowship to study collections in Colombia, Ecuador and the United States. In 1969 he worked in the ornithology department of the Fundação Parque Zoológico de São Paulo. He enrolled for higher studies in 1977, graduating in 1978, and obtaining a doctorate in 1991 at the age of 61 with studies on Tinamus solitarius.

== Eponymy ==
Bokermann is named in numerous taxa including: Simpsonichthys bokermanni, lonchophylla bokermanni, Dendropsophus bokermanni, Phrynomedusa bokermanni, Aparasphenodon bokermanni, Caecilia bokermanni, Pterolebias bokermanni, Neobidessus bokermanni, Protometers bokermanni, Canthidium bokermanni and the rare Araripe manakin (Antilophia bokermanni).
