= A. corvinus =

A. corvinus may refer to:

- Abacetus corvinus, a ground beetle
- Aplonis corvinus, a synonym of Aplonis corvina, the Kosrae starling, an extinct bird
