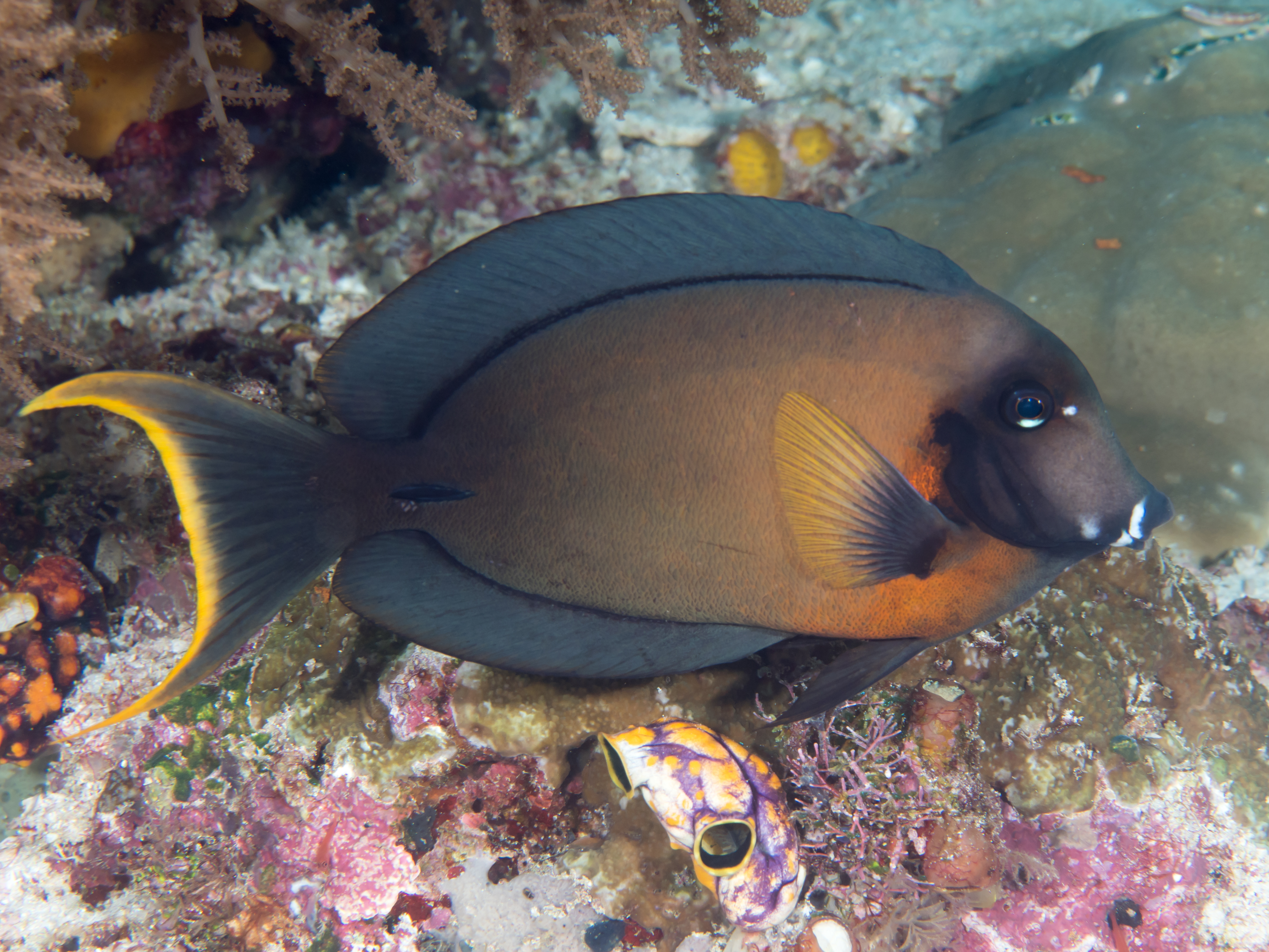
- Adult, in Indonesia

Conservation status
- Least Concern (IUCN 3.1)

Scientific classification
- Kingdom: Animalia
- Phylum: Chordata
- Class: Actinopterygii
- Division: Teleostei
- Order: Acanthuriformes
- Family: Acanthuridae
- Genus: Acanthurus
- Species: A. pyroferus

Binomial name
- Acanthurus pyroferus Kittlitz, 1834

Synonyms
- List: Hepatus pyroferus (Kittlitz, 1834); Acanthurus armiger Valenciennes, 1835; Acanthurus celebicus Bleeker, 1853; Hepatus celebicus (Bleeker, 1853); Rhombotides celebicus (Bleeker, 1853); Acanthurus fuscus Steindachner, 1861

= Acanthurus pyroferus =

Species of fish

Acanthurus pyroferus, also known as the chocolate surgeonfish, mimic surgeonfish, orange-gilled surgeonfish, Pacific mimic surgeon, and yellowspot surgeon, is a species of marine ray-finned fish belonging to the family Acanthuridae, which includes the surgeonfishes, unicornfishes and tangs. This species is found in the Indo-Pacific region.

== Taxonomy ==
Acanthurus pyroferus was first formally described in 1834 by the Prussian explorer and naturalist Heinrich von Kittlitz with its type locality given as Uléa in the Caroline Islands. The genus Acanthurus is one of two genera in the tribe Acanthurini which is one of three tribes in the subfamily Acanthurinae which is one of two subfamilies in the family Acanthuridae.

=== Etymology ===
Acanthurus pyroferus has the specific name pyroferus, which means "firebearer", this is thought to be a reference to the orange colour (described as saffron by Kittlitz) to the rear of the gill slit and above the pectoral fin.

== Description ==
Acanthurus pyroferus has its dorsal fin supported by 8 spines and between 27 and 30 soft rays while the anal fin is supported by 3 spines and between 24 and 28 soft rays. The overall colour of this fish's body is yellowish brown with a white band around its mouth. There is a band of dark colour running from the chin to the upper margin of the operculum with a patch of orange coloration around the base of the pectoral fin. The caudal fin has a white posterior margin. The maximum published total length of this species is 29 cm (11 in).

== Distribution and habitat ==
Acanthurus pyroferus is found in the Indo-Pacific. In the Indian Ocean it is found at the Scott and Ashmore Reef, Christmas Island and the Cocos (Keeling) Islands while in the Pacific it extends as far east as French Polynesia and the Line Islands, north to Wakayama Prefecture in Japan and south to New South Wales. It is found at depths between 2 and 60 m (6 ft 7 in and 196 ft 10 in), living solitarily on reefs.

== Biology ==
This species feeds by grazing on algae and detritus. The juveniles may be venomous as there are grooves in the spines but the ability to produce venom appears to be lost in adults.

Juveniles

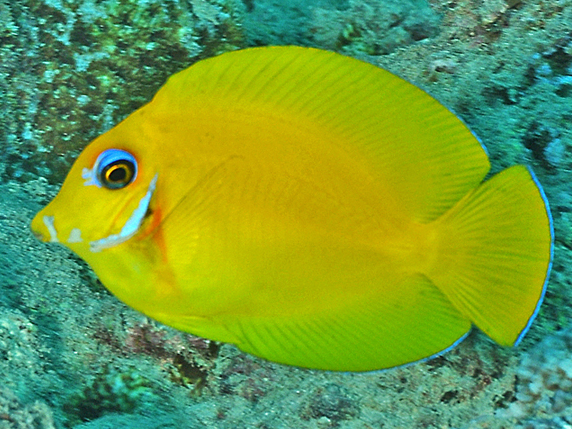
Centropyge flavissima mimic, in French Polynesia

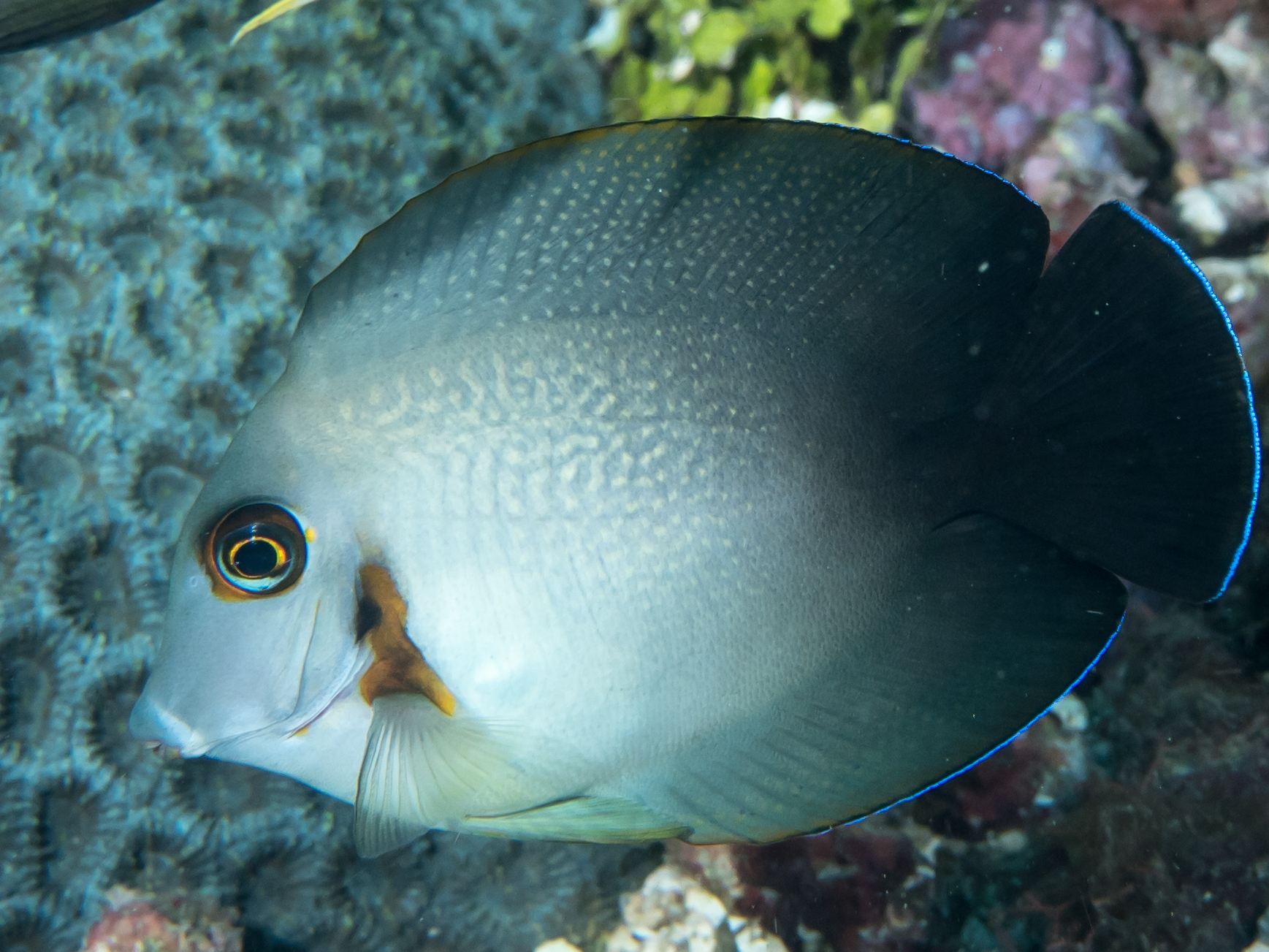
Centropyge vrolikii mimic, in Indonesia

Acanthurus pyroferus juveniles mimic Centropyge flavissima in the central and eastern islands of the South Pacific, but in the western Pacific, such as Palau where this species is absent, they mimic C. vrolikii. In areas where both C. flavissima and C. vrolikii occur, such as at Vanuatu, A. pyroferus juveniles have been recorded mimicking either species, but also sometimes appearing to mimic C. flavissima × vrolikii hybrids.
