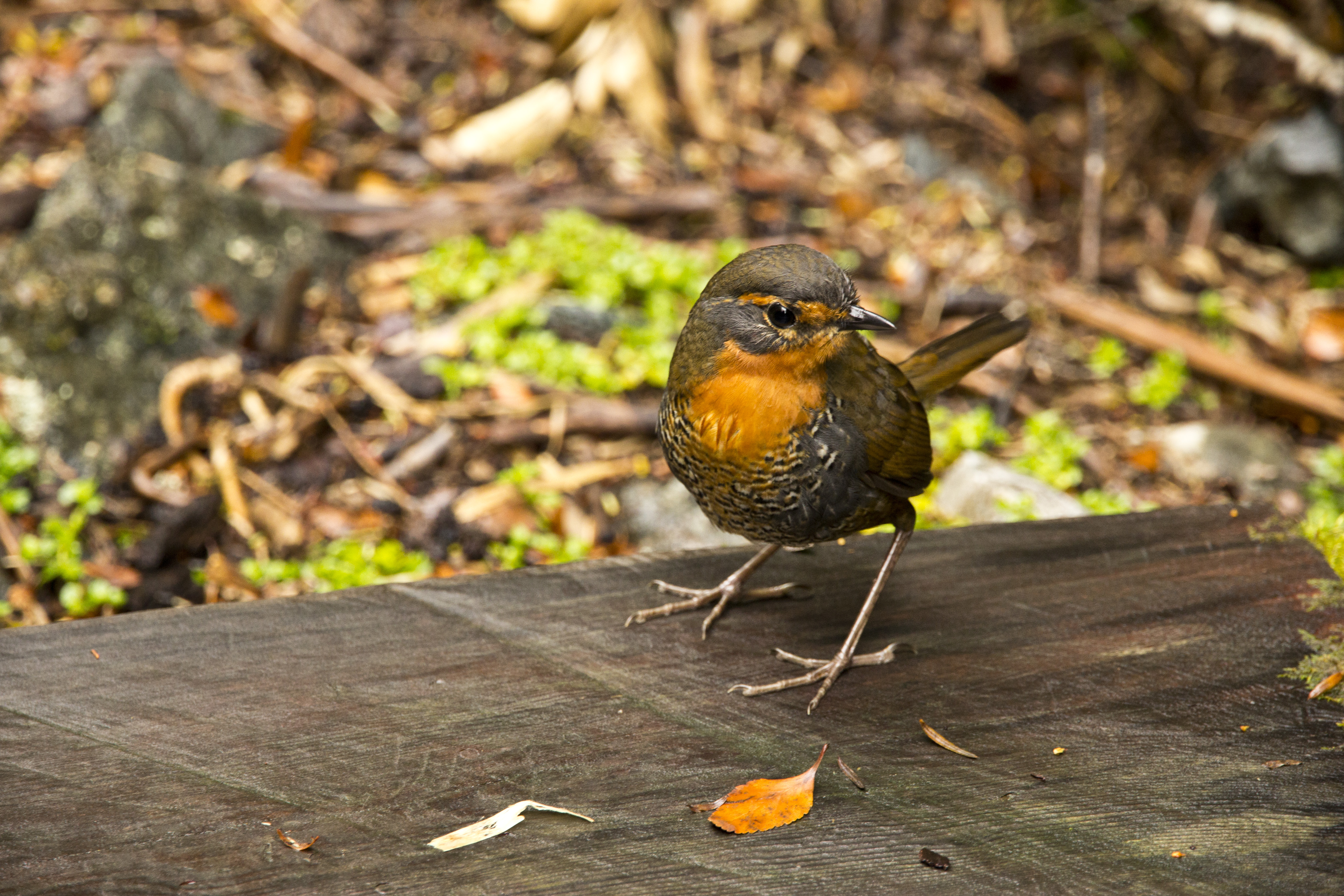
- Chucao tapaculo (Scelorchilus rubecula)

Scientific classification
- Kingdom: Animalia
- Phylum: Chordata
- Class: Aves
- Order: Passeriformes
- Family: Rhinocryptidae
- Genus: Scelorchilus; Oberholser, 1923

Type species
- Pteroptochus rubecula von Kittlitz, 1830

= Scelorchilus =

Genus of birds

Scelorchilus is a genus of bird in the family Rhinocryptidae.

== Species ==
It contains the following species:

Genus Scelorchilus – Oberholser, 1923 – two species
Common name	Scientific name and subspecies	Range	Size and ecology	IUCN status and estimated population
White-throated tapaculo	Scelorchilus albicollis (Kittlitz, 1830)	Chile.	Size: Habitat: Diet:	LC
Chucao tapaculo	Scelorchilus rubecula (Kittlitz, 1830) Two subspecies: S. r. rubecula.; S. r. mochae	Chile and Argentina	Size: Habitat: Diet:	LC
