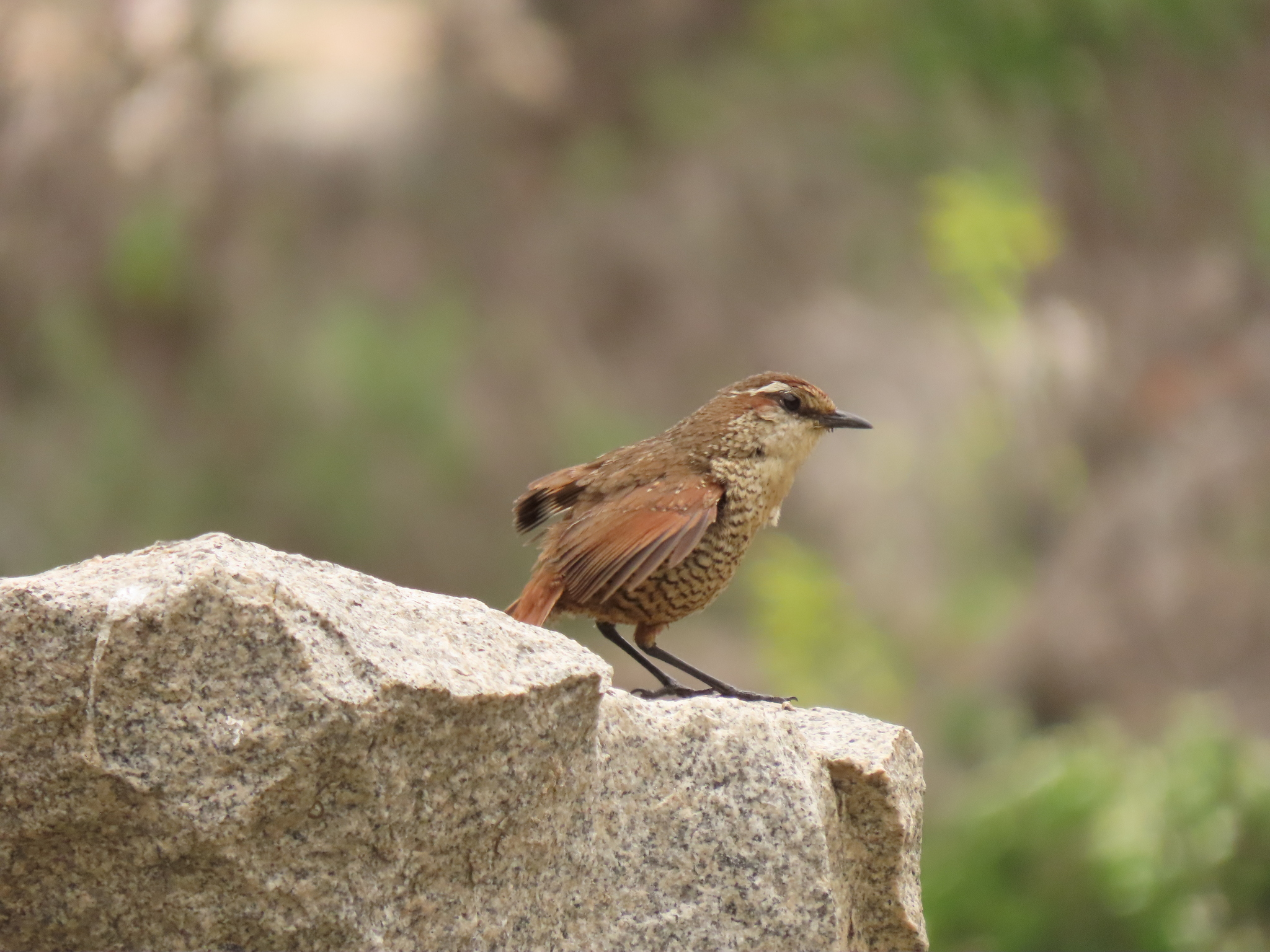

Conservation status
- Least Concern (IUCN 3.1)

Scientific classification
- Kingdom: Animalia
- Phylum: Chordata
- Class: Aves
- Order: Passeriformes
- Family: Rhinocryptidae
- Genus: Scelorchilus
- Species: S. albicollis

Binomial name
- Scelorchilus albicollis (Kittlitz, 1830)

= White-throated tapaculo =

Species of bird

The white-throated tapaculo (Scelorchilus albicollis) is a species of bird in the family Rhinocryptidae. It is endemic to Chile.

== Taxonomy and systematics ==
The white-throated tapaculo has two subspecies. The nominate Scelorchilus albicollis albicollis was described by Kittlitz in 1830. The second, S. a. atacamae, was described by Carl Eduard Hellmayr in 1924.

== Description ==
The adult of the nominate subspecies of white-throated tapaculo has a cinnamon forehead, a bold white supercilium, and gray-brown upper parts. The rump is lightly barred. The underparts are whitish darkening to pale cinnamon on the belly. Most of the underparts have dark brown bars. The subspecies S. a. atacamae is similarly colored but paler; in particular the upper parts are much more gray than brown. The juveniles are similar to the adults but barred all over. The white-throated tapaculo is approximately 19 cm (7.5 in) long.

== Distribution and habitat ==
The white-throated tapaculo is found only in Chile. Subspecies S. a. atacamae ranges from the Antofagasta Region south to the northern part of the Coquimbo Region. S. a. albicollis is found from the Coquimbo Region south to the Maule Region. The more northern part of its range is characterized by xeric shrublands and the more southerly part by woodlands and scrub in a Mediterranean climate. The species is usually found from sea level to 1,000 m (3,300 ft) but also up to 1,600 m (5,200 ft). It is thought to be sedentary.

== Behavior ==
=== Feeding ===
The white-throated tapaculo's diet is almost exclusively arthropods. It forages mostly on the ground in dense cover.

=== Breeding ===
The white-throated tapaculo's nest is a cup made of soft grass built at the end of a tunnel up to 2 m (6.6 ft) long. Eggs are laid in September and October. Both the male and the female incubate the eggs and feed the nestlings.

=== Vocalization ===
The white-throated tapaculo sings from the ground or a low perch. The typical song is a series of "barking" notes falling in pitch . The call is a harsh grunt that has been compared to a pig's .

== Status ==
The IUCN has assessed the white-throated tapaculo as of Least Concern. It has a fairly large range that includes some protected areas. The population has not been quantified but the species is "fairly common" and their number is believed to be stable.
