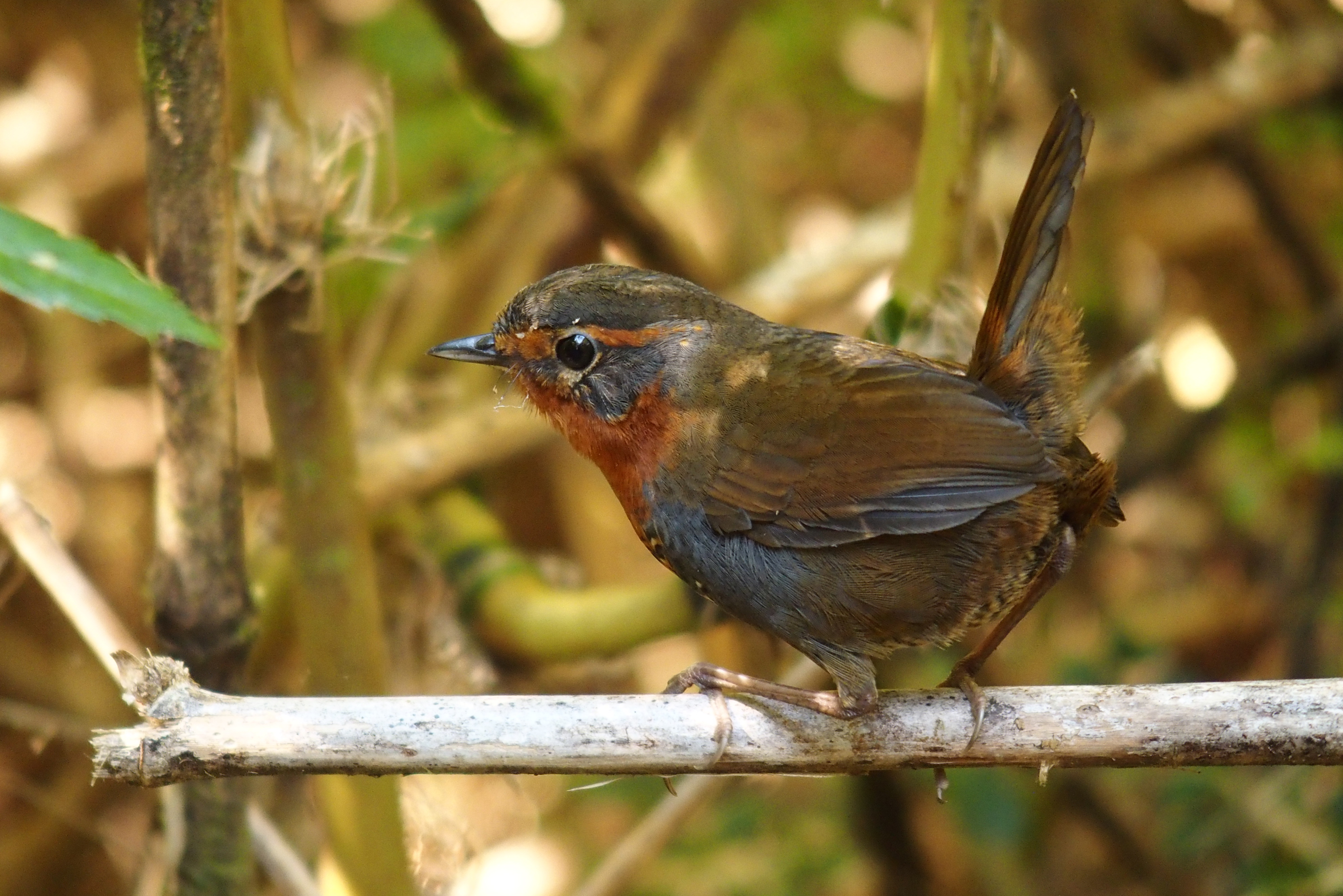
- In Huerquehue National Park, Chile

Conservation status
- Least Concern (IUCN 3.1)

Scientific classification
- Kingdom: Animalia
- Phylum: Chordata
- Class: Aves
- Order: Passeriformes
- Family: Rhinocryptidae
- Genus: Scelorchilus
- Species: S. rubecula

Binomial name
- Scelorchilus rubecula (Kittlitz, 1830)

= Chucao tapaculo =

Species of bird

The chucao tapaculo (Scelorchilus rubecula) is a species of bird in the family Rhinocryptidae. It is found in central Chile and adjacent Argentina; it has also been recorded in Chile's Magallanes Province.

== Taxonomy and systematics ==
The chucao tapaculo has two subspecies. The nominate Scelorchilus rubecula rubecula is primarily found in central Chile from the Biobío Region south to the Aysén Region and the adjoining parts of Argentina. It has occasionally been recorded further north and once in the far southern Magallanes Province. The other subspecies, S. r. mochae, is found only on Mocha Island off the Chilean coast.

== Description ==
The chucao tapaculo is 18.5 to 19 cm (7.3 to 7.5 in) long. Three specimens of unknown sex weighed 42.6 to 45.4 g (1.50 to 1.60 oz) and a single male specimen weighed 53.7 g (1.89 oz). The adult is dusky brown above; much of the face and the throat and upper breast are rufous. The rest of the breast is dark gray with white bars and the flanks and vent are reddish brown to olive brown.

== Distribution and habitat ==
The chucao tapaculo occurs from sea level to 1,500 m (4,900 ft) elevation. Its habitat is temperate and humid forests. It is typically found in Chusquea bamboo thickets within Nothofagus forest but also inhabits secondary woodland.

== Behavior ==
=== Feeding ===
The chucao tapaculo's diet is dominated by arthropods and seeds. It forages on the ground alone or in pairs. It usually remains hidden in dense foliage but occasionally feeds in more open areas.

=== Breeding ===
In Chile the chucao tapaculo lays eggs in September to October and in Argentina, November. The open cup nest is made of soft grass and rootlets built at the end of a burrow up to 3 m (9.8 ft) deep. Two to three eggs are laid. Both the male and female tend nestlings. This species showed a pattern of aggressiveness and territoriality towards the other species of tapaculos in the forest of southern Chile.

=== Vocalization ===
The chucao tapaculo has a loud song beginning and ending with soft churrs surrounding four or five clearer, louder, and higher pitched notes .

== Status ==
The IUCN has assessed the chucao tapaculo as of Least Concern, though the population is thought to be decreasing. It seems vulnerable to fragmentation of its habitat.
