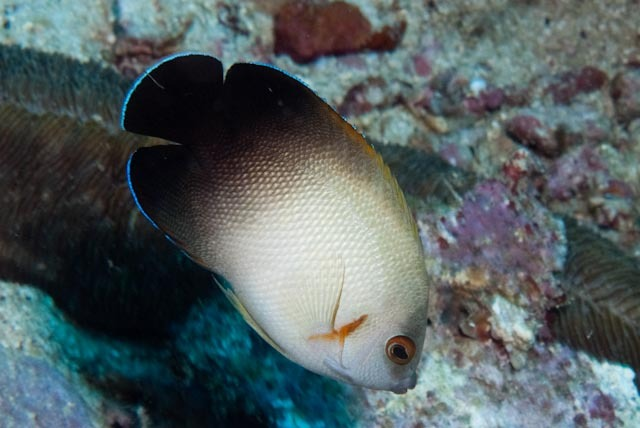

Conservation status
- Least Concern (IUCN 3.1)

Scientific classification
- Kingdom: Animalia
- Phylum: Chordata
- Class: Actinopterygii
- Order: Acanthuriformes
- Family: Pomacanthidae
- Genus: Centropyge
- Species: C. vrolikii

Binomial name
- Centropyge vrolikii (Bleeker, 1853)

Synonyms
- Holacanthus vrolikii Bleeker, 1853; Centropyge vroliki (Bleeker, 1853)

= Centropyge vrolikii =

Species of fish

Centropyge vrolikii, known commonly as the pearlscale angelfish or half black angelfish, is a species of marine ray-finned fish, a marine angelfish belonging to the family Pomacanthidae. It is found in the Indo-Pacific.

== Description ==
Centropyge vrolikii has a pale greyish to brownish body marked with whitish scale centres that darken to black towards the tail. The gill slit and base of the pectoral fin are orange. The caudal fin and posterior part of the dorsal and anal fins have a blue margin. The dorsal fin contains 14 spines and 15–16 soft rays while the anal fin has 3 spines and 16–17 soft rays. This species attains a maximum total length of 12 centimetres (4.7 in).

== Distribution ==
Centropyge vrolikii is found in the Indo-Pacific region. Its range extends from Christmas Island in the west to Vanuatu and the Marshall Islands in the east, north to Taiwan and south to Lord Howe Island. In continental Australia it also occurs off north-western Western Australia and on the northern parts of the Great Barrier Reef of Queensland, as far south central coast of New South Wales.

== Habitat and biology ==
Centropyge vrolikii is found at depths between 1 and 25 metres (3.3 and 82.0 ft). This species is found in lagoons and seaward reefs, most frequently in areas of dense coral growth. They are common where there is a rock or rubble substrate, particularly where there is rich and varied algal and sponge growth. It is a largely herbivorous species which feeds on filamentous algae, but also on sponges. This species is able to change sex from female to male: when there is no male in a harem, one of the females changes sex. The juveniles of the mimic surgeonfish (Acanthurus pyroferus) mimic this angelfish.

== Systematics ==
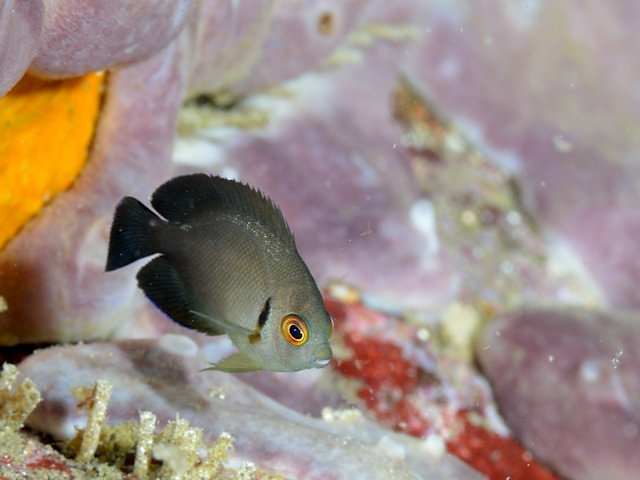
Juvenile

Centropyge vrolikii was first formally described as Holocanthus vrolikii in 1853 by the Dutch physician, herpetologist and ichthyologist Pieter Bleeker (1819–1874) with the type locality given as Ambon Island. The specific name honours the Dutch anatomist and pathologist Willem Vrolik (1801–1863). Some authorities place this species in the subgenus Centropyge; where they are sympatric this species will hybridise with C. eibli and C. flavissima.

== Utilisation ==
Centropyge vrolikii is common in the aquarium trade, but does not tolerate Ionic copper medications very well. It is recommended to use Ionic copper treatments only, or rather, a less harsh procedure such as the Hybrid Tank Transfer method
