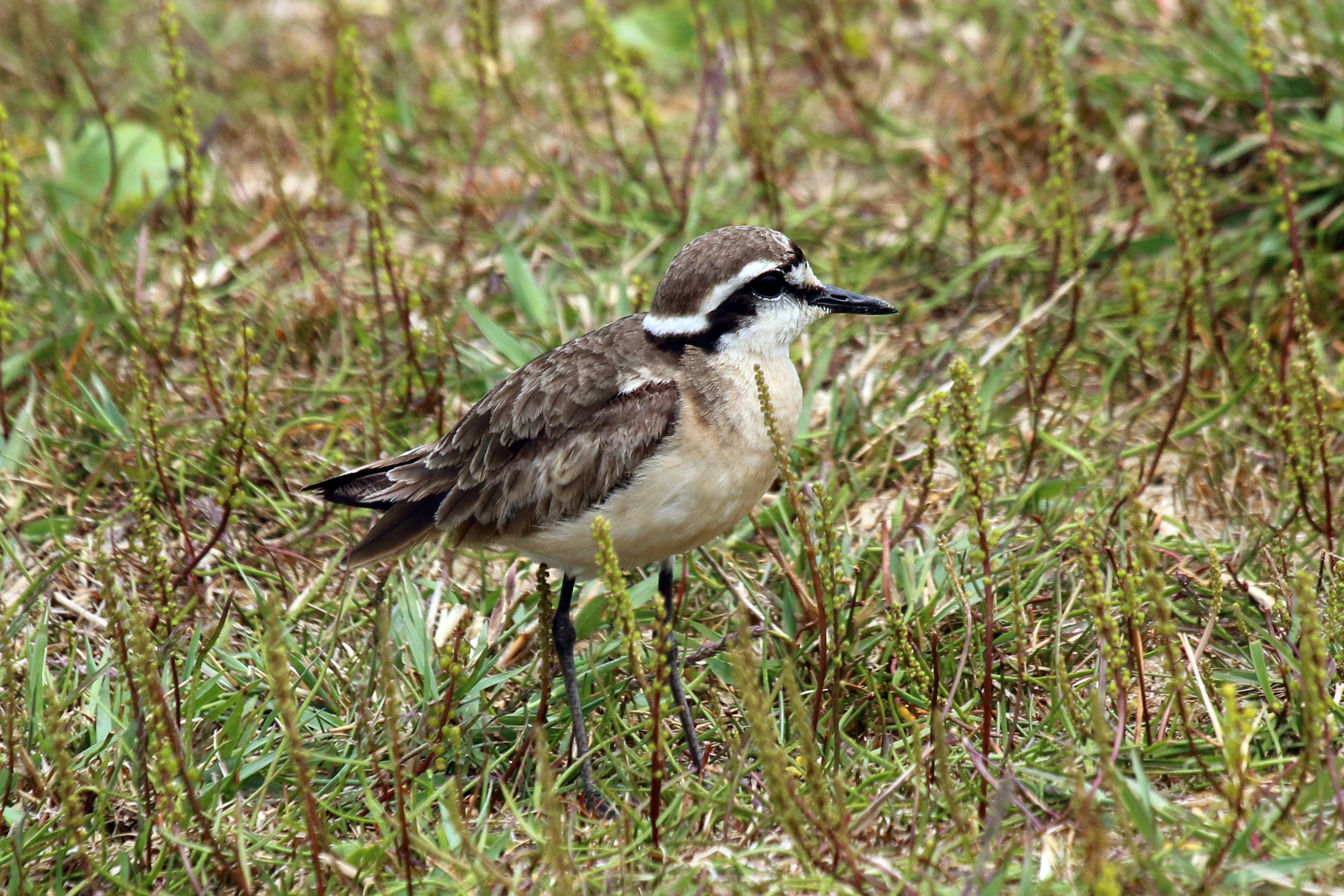
- At iSimangaliso Wetland Park, KwaZulu Natal, South Africa

Conservation status
- Least Concern (IUCN 3.1)

Scientific classification
- Kingdom: Animalia
- Phylum: Chordata
- Class: Aves
- Order: Charadriiformes
- Family: Charadriidae
- Genus: Anarhynchus
- Species: A. pecuarius

Binomial name
- Anarhynchus pecuarius (Temminck, 1823)

= Kittlitz's plover =

Species of bird

Kittlitz's plover (Anarhynchus pecuarius) is a small shorebird (35–40 g) in the family Charadriidae that breeds near coastal and inland saltmarshes, sandy or muddy riverbanks or alkaline grasslands with short vegetation. It is native to much of Sub-Saharan Africa, the Nile Delta and Madagascar. It is thought to be mainly polygamous and has monomorphic plumage.

== Description ==
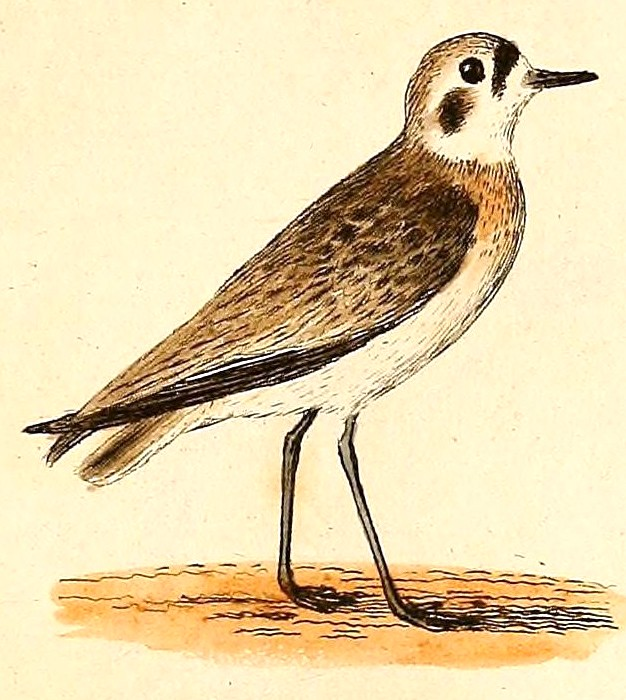
Illustration by Heinrich von Kittlitz, after whom the species is named

Kittlitz's plover is a small shorebird weighing between 35 and 40 grams. Both males and females share similar physical characteristics, with a black bill, dark brown eyes framed by black eyelids, and black legs, although at times, the legs can appear greenish or grey. During the breeding season, the male displays distinct features, including a white forehead, a blackish bar followed by a narrow white bar on the forecrown, while the remainder of the crown appears brown with sandy tips on the feathers. A black stripe, separated from the crown by a white superciliary stripe, runs from the bill through the eye and extends to the side of the neck, forming a collar across the upper mantle. The mantle is dark grey-brown, and the other upperparts are sooty brown with feathers featuring sandy rufous margins. The face, chin and upper throat are white, while the rest of the underparts take on a yellowish hue, with a pale belly. Kittlitz's plover possesses blackish central tail feathers that progressively become lighter towards the tail's sides, and the outer one or two pairs are completely white. Notably, Kittlitz's plover is not sexually size dimorphic, meaning that males and females share similar size characteristics. The female plumage closely resembles that of the male, although the black band across the forecrown is narrower. The non-breeding plumage does not differ significantly from the breeding plumage. In this stage, the eye stripe takes on a browner shade, and the frontal bar is absent, while the underparts become considerably paler. Generally, adult Kittlitz's plovers exhibit a wing length ranging from 100 to 110 mm, an adult bill length between 15 and 23 mm, and an adult tarsus length between 26 and 33 mm. Juvenile Kittlitz's plovers closely resemble adults; however, they lack the black face marks, their upperparts appear brown, the hindneck collar is buff in color, and their underparts are white.

== Distribution, movement and habitat ==
=== Distribution ===
Kittlitz's plover is distributed throughout most of sub-Saharan Africa, but is also native to Madagascar and the Nile River Delta. A genetic study reported genetic differentiation between Madagascar and the mainland population. It is common in South Africa, however rarer in arid regions of Botswana and Namibia. In Namibia, it mostly inhabits coastal regions, highlands and Ovamboland. It is more scarce in the southern lowveld of South Africa and patchy in the interior of KwaZulu-Natal and the eastern Cape. Usually it avoids mountains or densely wooded areas. The Malagasy population might result from a relatively recent immigration from mainland Africa, whereas the Madagascar plover (Anarhynchus thoracius) might have evolved from an earlier Kittlitz's plover population. The two species are clearly distinct and can not interbreed. Birds from Madagascar are in general smaller than birds from continental Africa. Kittlitz's plovers are heavier and have longer wings in South Africa compared to Madagascar, whereas Egyptian specimens have longer wings and shorter tarsi than in Madagascar. However, they are still regarded as the same species in the absence of apparent plumage difference. In Madagascar, Kittlitz's plover is both a breeding resident and intra-island migrant and has been recorded mostly below 950 m, although it has been recorded at up to 1,400 m too.

=== Movements ===
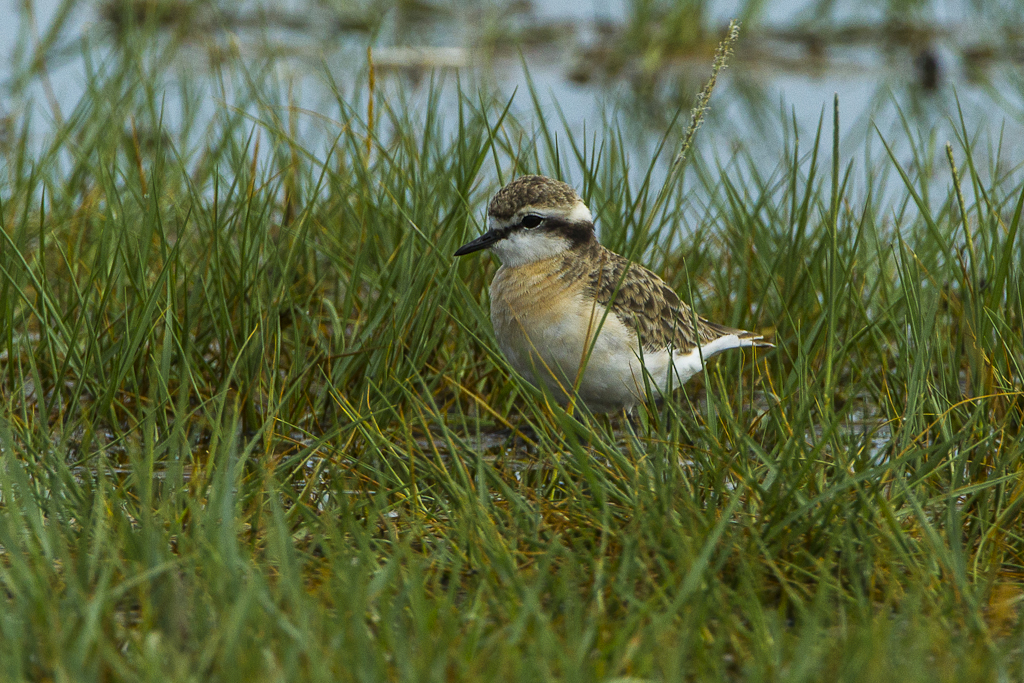
In the Maasai Mara, Kenya

The African populations are partially sedentary in coastal areas, but mostly nomadic or migratory with their movements varying between years in response to rainfall. There is limited evidence for comparable variation in Madagascar. In the lower Mangoky basin for instance, they are thought to be resident, whereas at the Lake Tsimanampetsotsa, ringed adults have been recorded to have moved 113 km to Ifaty.

=== Habitat ===
Kittlitz's plover can be both found in inland and coastal regions. It favours open habitats at low elevation, often dry ground (open dry mud) with very short grass, mostly in close proximity to water. It breeds at lakes, alkaline grasslands, lagoons, rivers, tidal mudflats or inland saltmarshes and artificial water bodies including commercial salt pans, but generally avoids sandy or rocky beaches. In the eastern and western Cape, some populations move to estuarine mudflats during the winter, probably because of reduced competition from Palearctic migrants but also to avoid food shortage due to harsh interior winters. They are strictly terrestrial, feeding, nesting, preening and roosting solely on the ground.

== Voice ==
The Kittlitz's plover's calls include 'pipip', 'towhit', 'tit-peep', 'trit-tritritritrit', 'perrup' and 'kich-kich-kich'. They give alarm calls when in danger or when flushed, which include 'chirrt', hard 'trip', 'tric', 'prrrt' or plaintive 'pip-ip'. During fights, the males give a buzzy call in aggressive or courtship chases. When male or female are feigning injury, they give a 'cheep-cheep' and when a parent is inviting the young to brood, it gives a 'chip-chip' and the young are being warned with a 'trr-trr'. The call of a young is a thin 'peep'.

== Feeding ==
Kittlitz's plover forages in a typical run-stop-search fashion, meaning it runs around, stops suddenly to peck at an item and then continues running. Sometimes, an individual stands erect with one foot vibrating on the surface (foot-trembling), then lunges forward to catch any prey that has been attracted to the surface. This behaviour has not been reported in Madagascar. They feed day and night (on moonlit nights until 11PM) often in groups of 2–5 individuals or in small mixed flocks together with other small waders like the Calidris species. When foraging, they can show an aggressive behaviour, especially towards conspecifics and species with similar diets, e.g. curlew sandpiper (Calidris ferruginea) or common ringed plover (Charadrius hiaticula). The aggression increases with density and is particularly high in the winter months before breeding. They mainly feed on insects, especially beetles, insect larvae, spiders, small crustaceans and molluscs. Most of their food is small, but they were recorded to have taken a cricket that was about 40 mm long.

== Behaviour ==
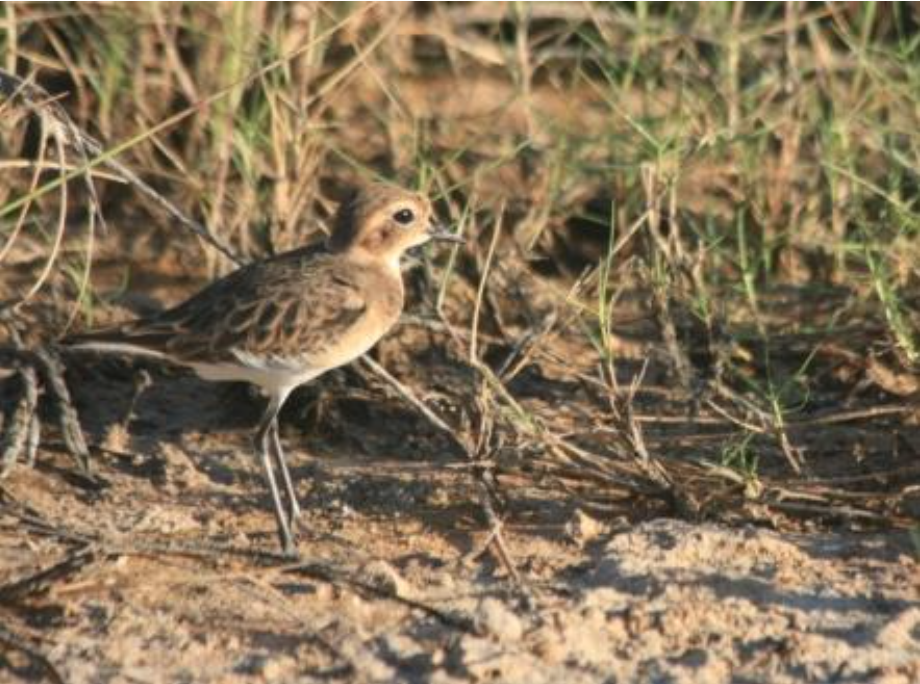
Juvenile Kittlitz's plover in Madagascar

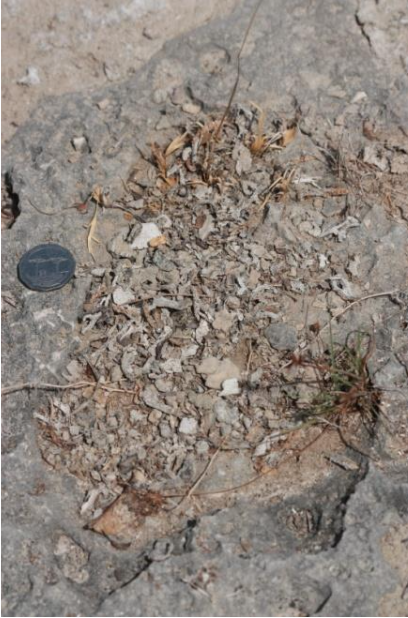
Typical cryptic nest of a Kittlitz's plover in Madagascar

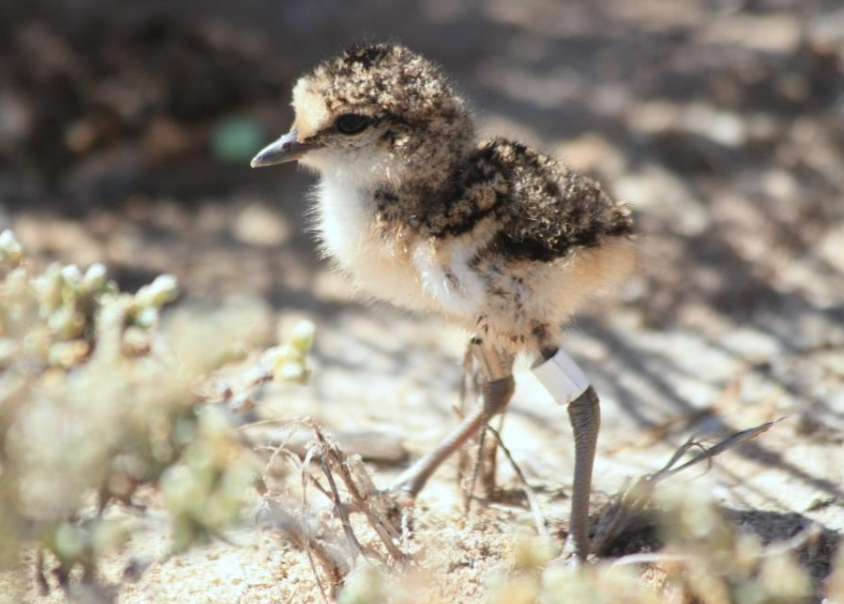
Ringed Kittlitz's plover chick in Madagascar

The species is social in the non-breeding season and stays in small flocks of about 20 individuals, however it has also been reported in larger flocks of 100–300 individuals during migratory movements.

=== Breeding and territories ===
Kittlitz's plover has a flexible breeding system and shorter duration of pair bond than other plover species. It is thought to be mainly polygamous and the pairing usually occurs around 2–4 weeks before the couple occupies their territory. Copulation and feeding both take place in the territories, which can occupy 3600–4200m². The parents are highly defensive of their territories until the chicks hatch. When intruders invade their territory representing a threat, the parents run after them, stopping shortly in front of them, taking on an upright posture with their legs almost straight and their head up.

=== Courtship ===
The initial courtship takes place on 'neutral' ground. and consists of a scrape-ceremony, where one bird is placing its breast on the sand, then rotating around on the breast, whilst having its tail raised and kicking out sand with back- and forward movements of its legs. Usually, the male takes the initiative of making several scrapes (although sometimes both parents take turns in making them) and then the female probably chooses the final nest site. Both parents pick up pebbles or break off bits of dead vegetation as nest material to line the nest with.

=== Nesting and incubation ===
The Kittlitz's plover is a ground-nesting shorebird, that breeds throughout the whole year, although there are varying peak seasons in different geographic locations. Copulation usually occurs 6–11 days before egg-laying on or near the nest scrape. The simple nest scrape is usually made 50–100 m away from water on open, dry ground at low elevation, from where it is easy to spot intruders. It is about 10–15 cm in diameter and is lined with shells, pebbles, animal dung and fragments of vegetation. The Kittlitz's plovers usually nest solitary or in loose flocks with their nests being mostly more than 40 m apart; however, they can be sometimes as close as 8 m. Sometimes the old scrape may be reused, probably by the same pair.

Kittlitz's plovers lay 1–3 eggs (usually 2) at 1–2 day intervals. They eggs are oval, dark grey-maroon with black speckles giving and overall sand-coloured or light brown background.

Incubation starts once the clutch is completed and is carried out by both parents – usually by the male at night and by the female during the day – for a period of 21–27 days. When a parent leaves the nest during the day or when the nest is approached by a predator, the parent usually covers the eggs up to two thirds or completely with sand within 3–90 s by moving several times around the nest kicking its feet alternately. Newly or partly hatched chicks also get covered. Sometimes the eggs might be left unattended up to 5–7 hours. When the parent returns to the nest, it uncovers the nest before pursuing incubation.

=== Parental care ===
Once the young have hatched, both parents remove eggshells from nest site. Newly hatched young are downy, their upper parts are grey to white, their back is mottled with a dark median stripe and their underparts are white. The chicks leave the nest within a few hours of hatching or may be brooded on the nest for up to 24 hours. The chicks are precocial and can feed for themselves from 24 hours after hatching; one parent usually leads them to foraging areas up to 1 km away from the nest. Kittlitz's plovers exhibit uniparental care, where only one parent (either male or female) stays with the young and broods them in frequent intervals until they can fly at 26–32 days. The parent calls the chicks when inviting them to brood or when danger is present. The parents actively defend their young against conspecifics or intruders by a) feigning injury to attract more attention on themselves by lying flat on the ground, flapping their wings in a helpless manner, fanning their tail or running away or towards intruder, b) false brooding or c) running with head held low, tail drooped and spread wings. Chicks and juveniles obtain adult plumage after one year, and some may start breeding at that age.

== Conservation ==
=== Status and trends ===
The IUCN classifies Kittlitz's plover as Least Concern. The species is abundant in Africa and locally common in Madagascar, and it has a very wide range. Although not much is known about population trends due to difficulties in assessing the impact of habitat modifications, any declines appear to be below the threshold that would be identified as threatening.

Kittlitz's plover is locally very abundant in East, South and Central Africa, with a population size estimated at 100,000–400,000 individuals. West Africa is estimated to sustain 20,000–50,000 individuals. In Madagascar, the population is estimated at 10,000–20,000 individuals, making the species locally common.

=== Demography ===
Kittlitz's plovers are long-lived birds with life-expectancies of almost 10 years, although there is evidence that individuals can live much longer than this.

=== Threats ===
Kittlitz's plover is mainly threatened by habitat loss due to wetland degradation. For example, one of the key wetland sites in southern Africa, Walvis Bay in Namibia, has been subject to degradation and destruction due to the building of roads, disturbance from tourists and wetland reclamation for the development of suburbs and ports. In Ghana, wetlands are threatened by coastal erosion and developments that include drainage and wetland reclamation

The fraction of the population migrating via the east Atlantic is vulnerable to avian malaria and would be greatly threatened in case of an outbreak of this disease. The same applies to avian botulism, which the Kittlitz's plover is susceptible to.
