= Abacetus corvinus =

Scientific classification
- Domain: Eukaryota
- Kingdom: Animalia
- Phylum: Arthropoda
- Class: Insecta
- Order: Coleoptera
- Suborder: Adephaga
- Family: Carabidae
- Genus: Abacetus
- Species: A. corvinus

Binomial name
- Abacetus corvinus Klug, 1833

Species of beetle

Abacetus corvinus is a species of ground beetle in the subfamily Pterostichinae. It was described by Johann Christoph Friedrich Klug in 1833.
