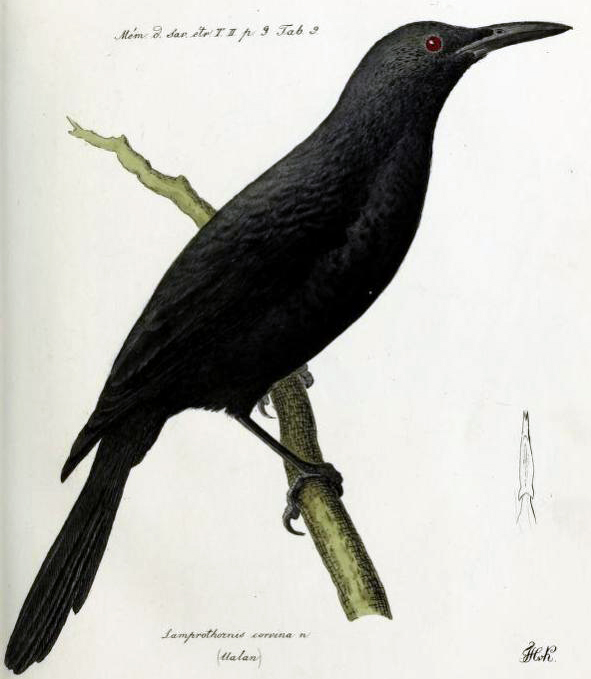
- Illustration from 1831

Conservation status
- Extinct (mid 19th century) (IUCN 3.1)

Scientific classification
- Kingdom: Animalia
- Phylum: Chordata
- Class: Aves
- Order: Passeriformes
- Family: Sturnidae
- Genus: Aplonis
- Species: †A. corvina

Binomial name
- †Aplonis corvina (Kittlitz, 1833)

Synonyms
- Aplonas corvina (lapsus); Aplonis corvinus (lapsus); Kittlitzia corvina (Kittlitz, 1833); Lamprothornis corvina Kittlitz, 1833

= Kosrae starling =

Extinct species of bird

The Kosrae starling, also known as Kosrae Island starling, and formerly as Kusaie Mountain starling, (Aplonis corvina) is an extinct bird from the family of starlings (Sturnidae). It was endemic to the montane forests on the island of Kosrae which belong to the Caroline Islands in the south-western Pacific.

== Description ==
Turnaround video of a male specimen, Naturalis Biodiversity Center

It reached a length between 20 and 25.4 centimetres. It was crow-like, glossy black and had a long curved bill as well as a long tail.

== Extinction ==
The Kosrae starling is only known by five specimens which were obtained between December 1827 and January 1828 by the Kittlitz Expedition. Kittlitz described the bird in 1833. Three skins can be seen in the Museum of Saint Petersburg in Russia and two further in the Museum Naturalis in Leiden. In 1880 an expedition led by Otto Finsch was unable to find this bird. Another survey by the Whitney South Seas Expedition of the American Museum of Natural History in 1931 proved that this species was extinct. Its extinction was most likely caused by rats which escaped from whaling vessels during the 19th century and became widespread on Kosrae.
