= Heinrich von Kittlitz =

Prussian artist, naval officer, explorer and naturalist

- Born: 16 February 1799; Breslau, Prussia (now Wrocław, Poland)
- Died: 10 April 1875 (aged 76); Mainz, Germany
- Other name: Freiherr von Kittlitz
- Known for: Large collection of birds (754 specimens of 314 species)
- Relatives: Hans Karl von Diebitsch (uncle)
- Scientific career
- Fields: Soldier, ornithology
- Workplaces: 16th Silesian Infantry Regiment 2nd Lt.)
- Author abbrev. (botany): Kittlitz
- Author abbrev. (zoology): Kittlitz

Friedrich Heinrich, Freiherr von Kittlitz (16 February 1799 – 10 April 1874) was a Prussian artist, naval officer, explorer and naturalist. He was a descendant of a family of old Prussian nobility ("Freiherr" meaning "independent lord" - ranking with a baron). He collected specimens and made illustrations on major expeditions and wrote a few books on his travels. Several species were described on the basis of specimens collected by him and a few are named after him including Kittlitz's plover.

== Life and work ==
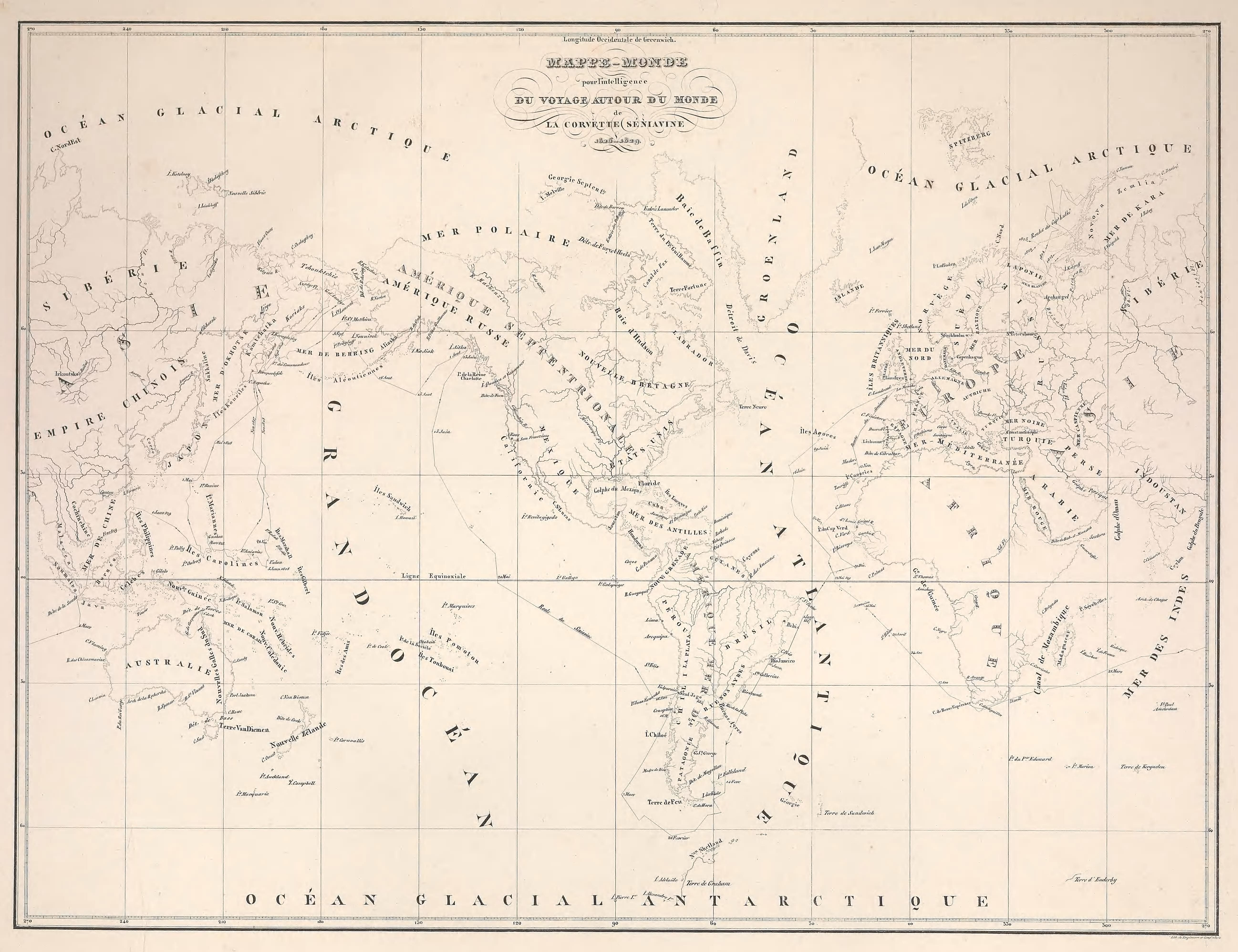
Route of the Senjawin

Kittlitz was born in Breslau to Prussian Captain Friedrich (1769-1825) and Henriette Ehrenfried von Diebitsch (1771-1835). He went to grammar school in Oels and joined his father's battalion as a volunteer in 1813. He became a second lieutenant in the 16th Silesian Infantry Regiment and saw action at Glogau. He went to Paris in 1815 and was garrisoned in Mainz when the Landwehr regiments were dissolved. It was here that he became interested in nature after meeting Eduard Rüppell. Through the influence of his maternal uncle Hans Karl von Diebitsch, field marshal in Russia, that he joined the Russian corvette Senjawin on a circumnavigational expedition between 1826 and 1829 under the leadership of Captain Fyodor Petrovich Litke (1797-1882). He travelled along with Prince Karl of Prussia to St. Petersburg and the expedition set sail on September 1. He made large collections on this expedition for the museum of the Imperial Academy of Sciences in St. Petersburg with 754 specimens of 314 bird species, including species that subsequently became extinct. Among them are the Micronesian species, Kosrae crake (Porzana monasa) and Kosrae starling (Aplonis corvina) which are known only from his specimens. He published Twenty-four Views of the Vegetation of the Coasts and Islands of the Pacific (1844).

Kittlitz travelled to North Africa in 1831 with his friend Eduard Rüppell, but had to return to Germany due to poor health. It was during his time in Egypt whilst waiting for a boat that he collected specimens of the bird which became known as Kittlitz's plover.

Kittlitz's murrelet, Kittlitz's rail, Kittlitz's thrush and Kittlitz's plover are all named for him.

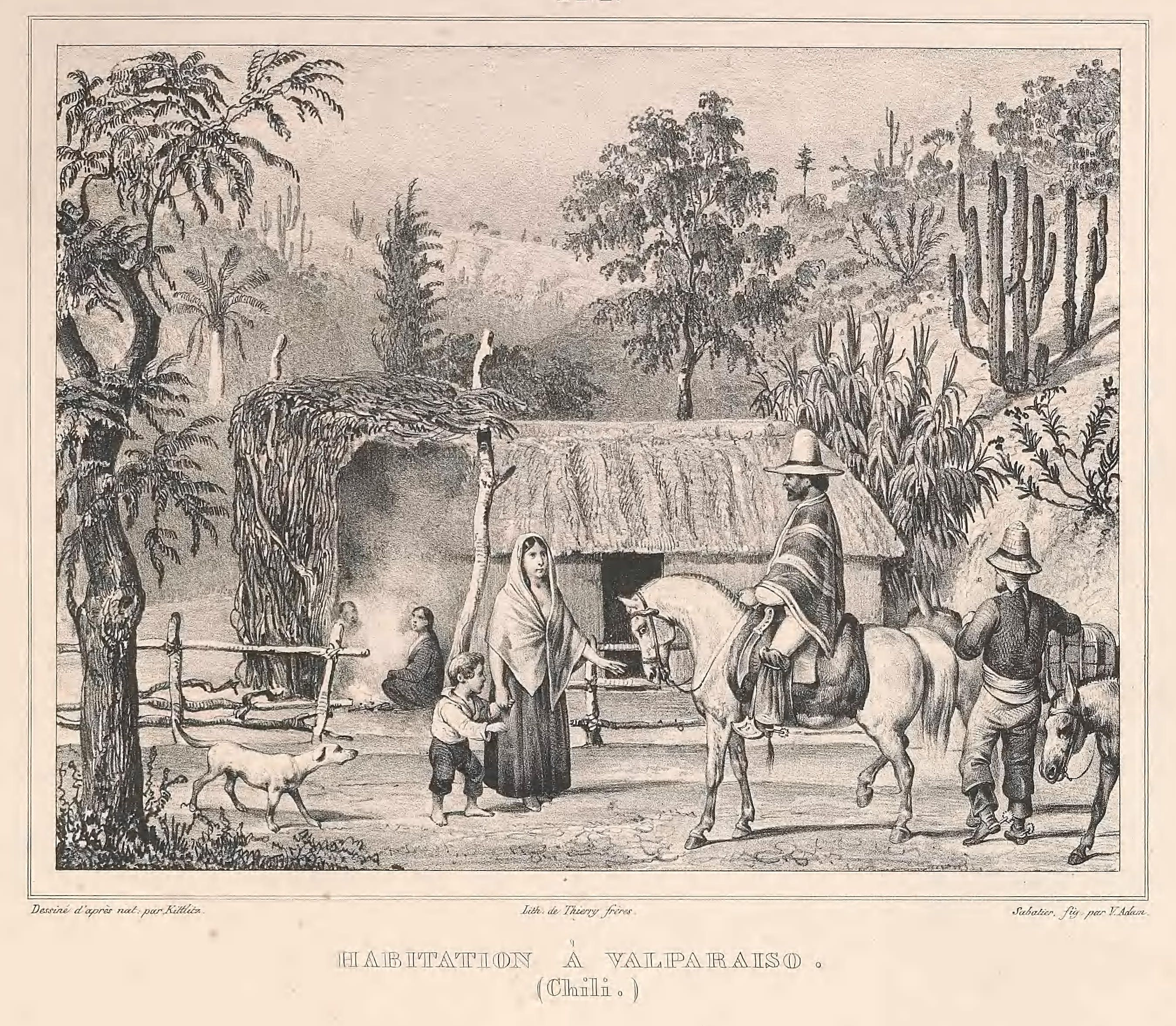
Life in Valparaiso, a sketch by Kittlitz

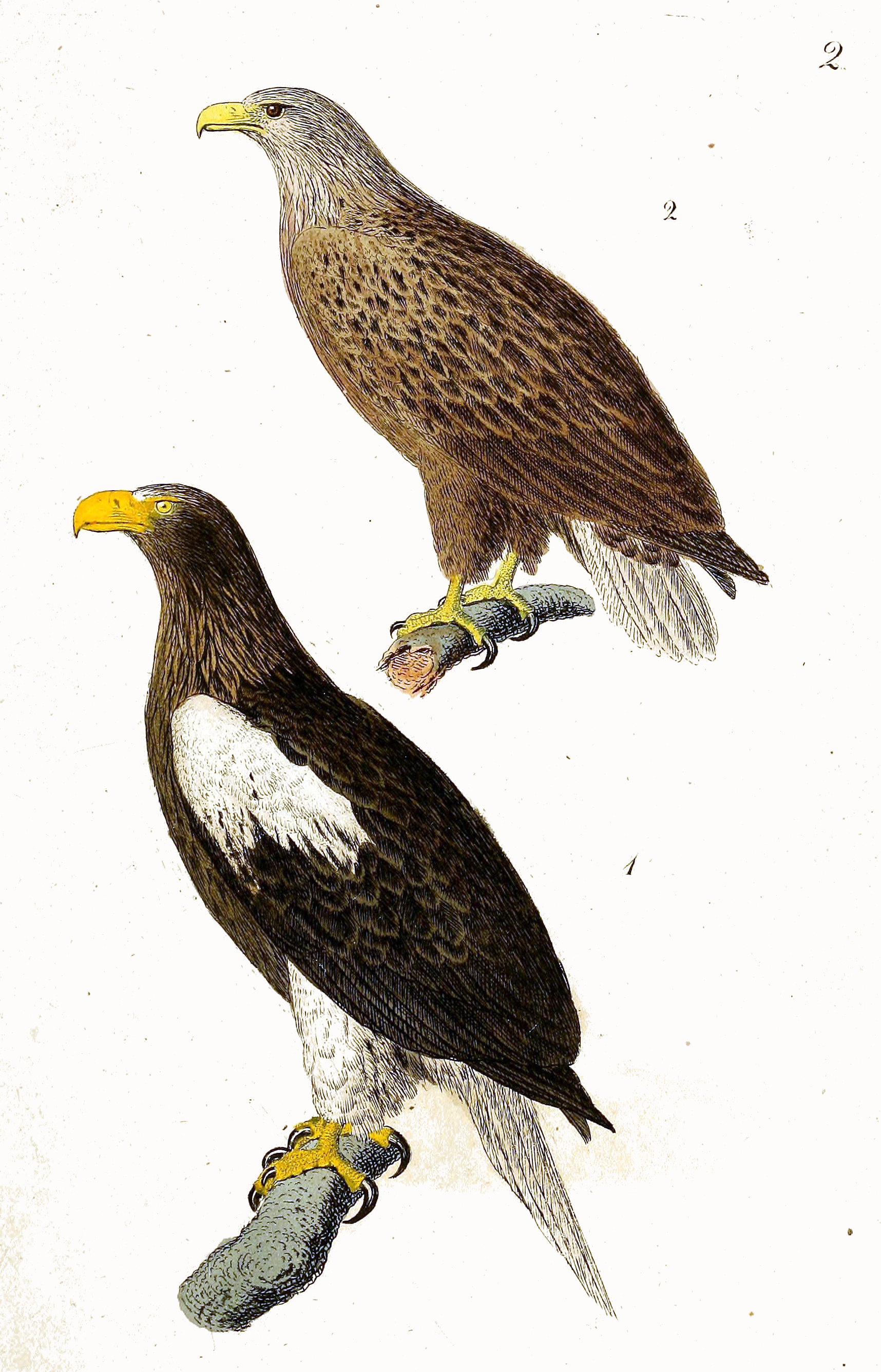
Steller's sea eagle by Kittlitz

== Works ==
- Kupfertafeln zur Naturgeschichte der Vögel, Frankfurt 1832, 1. Heft
- 24 Vegetationsansichten von den Küstenländern und Inseln des Stillen Ozeans, Wiesbaden 1845–1852
- Vegetationsansichten aus den westlichen Sudeten, Frankfurt 1854
- Naturszenen aus Kamtschatka
- Bilder vom Stillen Ozean
- Denkwürdigkeiten einer Reise nach dem russischen Amerika, nach Mikronesien und durch Kamtschatka, Gotha 1858, Band 1, Band 2
- Psychologische Grundlage für eine neue Philosophie der Kunst, Berlin 1863
- Schlußfolgerungen von der Seele des Menschen auf die Weltseele, Mainz 1873
- Ornithologisches Tagebuch. Handschrift mit Aquarellmalereien. 4 Bände (1816-1823).Wissenschaftliche Stadtbibliothek Mainz, Sammlung Moyat, Sign.: Moyat 658

== See also ==
- European and American voyages of scientific exploration
