= Trinectes microphthalmus =

Scientific classification
- Domain: Eukaryota
- Kingdom: Animalia
- Phylum: Chordata
- Class: Actinopterygii
- Order: Carangiformes
- Suborder: Pleuronectoidei
- Family: Achiridae
- Genus: Trinectes
- Species: T. microphthalmus

Binomial name
- Trinectes microphthalmus (Chabanaud, 1928)

Synonyms
- Achirus microphthalmus Chabanaud, 1928

Species of fish

Trinectes microphthalmus is a species of sole in the family Achiridae. It was described by Paul Chabanaud in 1928, originally under the genus Achirus. It is known from Venezuela, Brazil, Guyana, French Guiana, Suriname, and Trinidad and Tobago. It dwells in brackish lagoons at a depth range of 0 to 30 m (0 to 98 ft).

T. micropthalmus is rated as Least Concern on the IUCN redlist.
