= Catathyridium lorentzii =

Scientific classification
- Kingdom: Animalia
- Phylum: Chordata
- Class: Actinopterygii
- Order: Carangiformes
- Suborder: Pleuronectoidei
- Family: Achiridae
- Genus: Catathyridium
- Species: C. lorentzii

Binomial name
- Catathyridium lorentzii (Weyenbergh, 1877)

Synonyms
- Achirus lorentzii Weyenbergh, 1877; Hypoclinemus paraguayensis Chabanaud, 1928

Species of fish

Catathyridium lorentzii is a species of sole in the family Achiridae. It was described by Hendrik Weyenbergh in 1877, originally under the genus Achirus. It inhabits the Uruguay River and Paraguay River river. It reaches a maximum length of 5.4 cm (2.1 in).
