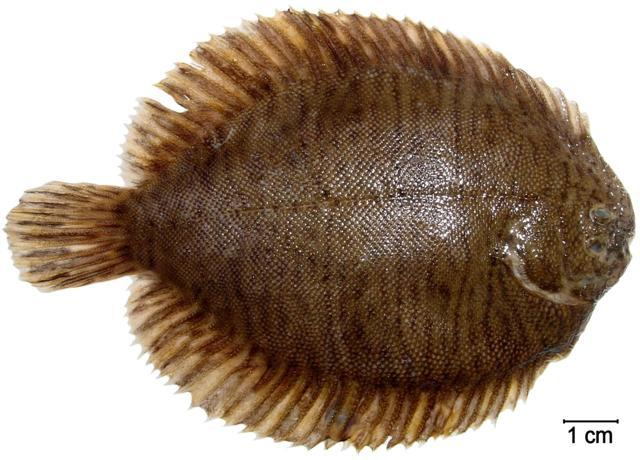

Scientific classification
- Domain: Eukaryota
- Kingdom: Animalia
- Phylum: Chordata
- Class: Actinopterygii
- Order: Carangiformes
- Suborder: Pleuronectoidei
- Family: Achiridae
- Genus: Catathyridium
- Species: C. garmani

Binomial name
- Catathyridium garmani (Jordan, 1889)

Synonyms
- Achirus garmani Jordan, 1889

= Catathyridium garmani =

Species of fish

Catathyridium garmani is a species of sole in the family Achiridae. It was described by David Starr Jordan in 1889, originally under the genus Achirus. It is known from Argentina, Brazil, and Uruguay. It reaches a maximum length of 17 cm (6.7 in).
