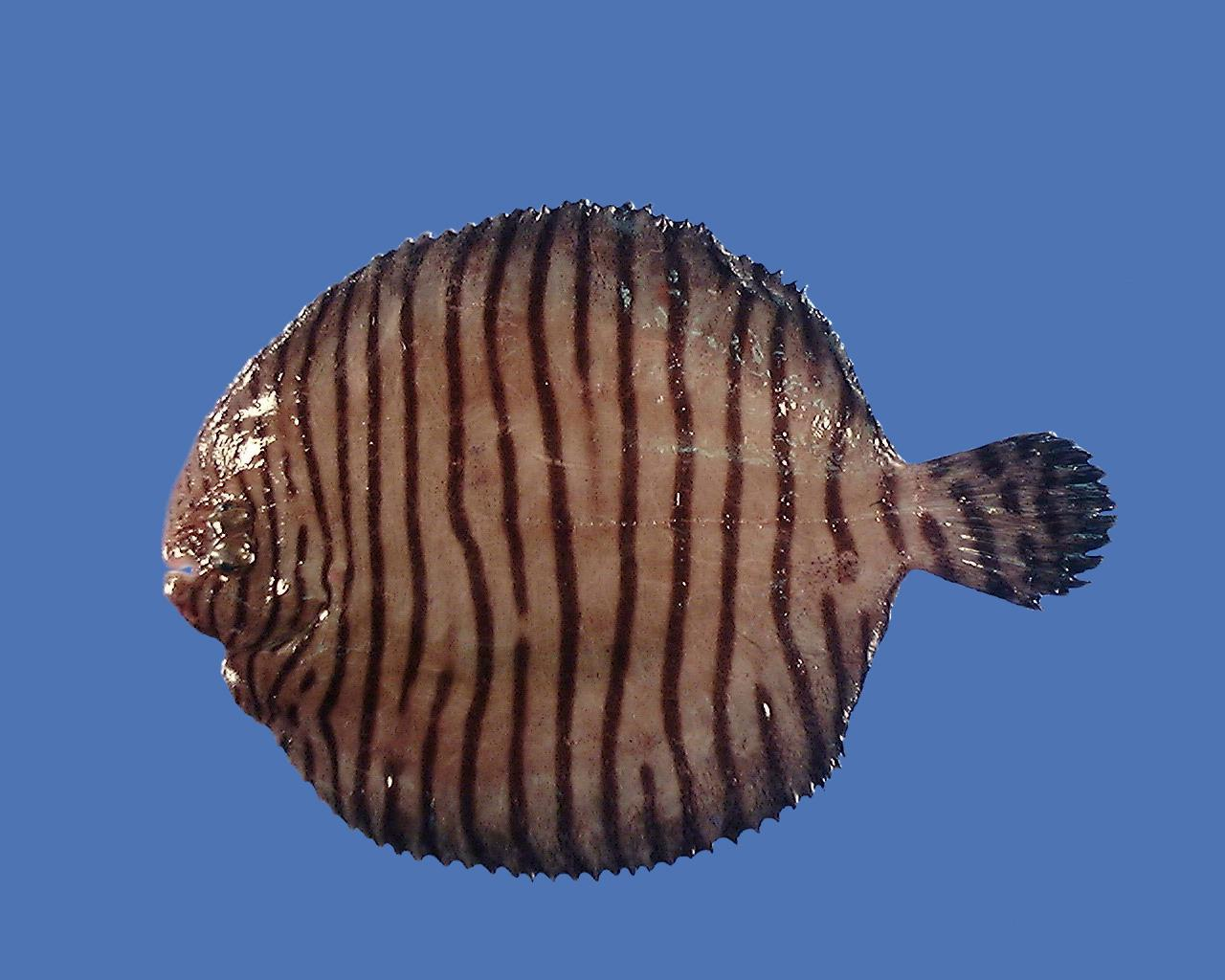

Scientific classification
- Domain: Eukaryota
- Kingdom: Animalia
- Phylum: Chordata
- Class: Actinopterygii
- Order: Carangiformes
- Suborder: Pleuronectoidei
- Family: Achiridae
- Genus: Gymnachirus
- Species: G. texae

Binomial name
- Gymnachirus texae (Gunter, 1936)

Synonyms
- Nodogymnus texae Gunter, 1936

= Gymnachirus texae =

Species of fish

The Gulf of Mexico fringed sole (Gymnachirus texae), also known as the fringed sole, is a species of sole in the family Achiridae. It was described by Gordon Gunter in 1936, originally under the genus Nodogymnus. It is known from the United States and Mexico. It dwells at a depth range of 20 to 187 m (66 to 614 ft). It reaches a maximum total length of 14 cm (5.5 in).

The Gulf of Mexico fringed sole is currently ranked as Least Concern by the IUCN redlist, although it makes note that part of its range was affected by the Deepwater Horizon oil spill in 2010. It is sometimes harvested as bycatch by shrimp trawls.
