= Apionichthys rosai =

Conservation status
- Least Concern (IUCN 3.1)

Scientific classification
- Kingdom: Animalia
- Phylum: Chordata
- Class: Actinopterygii
- Division: Teleostei
- Order: Carangiformes
- Suborder: Pleuronectoidei
- Family: Achiridae
- Genus: Apionichthys
- Species: A. rosai

Binomial name
- Apionichthys rosai R. T. C. Ramos, 2003

Species of fish

Apionichthys rosai is a species of sole in the family Achiridae. It was described by Robson Tamar da Costa Ramos in 2003. It is found in the Amazon River. It reaches a maximum standard length of 3.5 cm (1.4 in).

The species epithet "rosai" was given in honour of Ricardo de Sousa Rosa, a marine scientist at the Federal University of Paraíba in Brazil.
