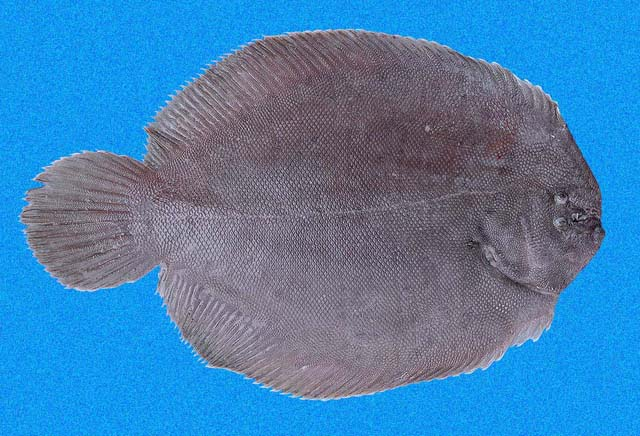

Conservation status
- Least Concern (IUCN 3.1)

Scientific classification
- Kingdom: Animalia
- Phylum: Chordata
- Class: Actinopterygii
- Order: Carangiformes
- Suborder: Pleuronectoidei
- Family: Achiridae
- Genus: Achirus
- Species: A. mazatlanus

Binomial name
- Achirus mazatlanus (Steindachner, 1869)
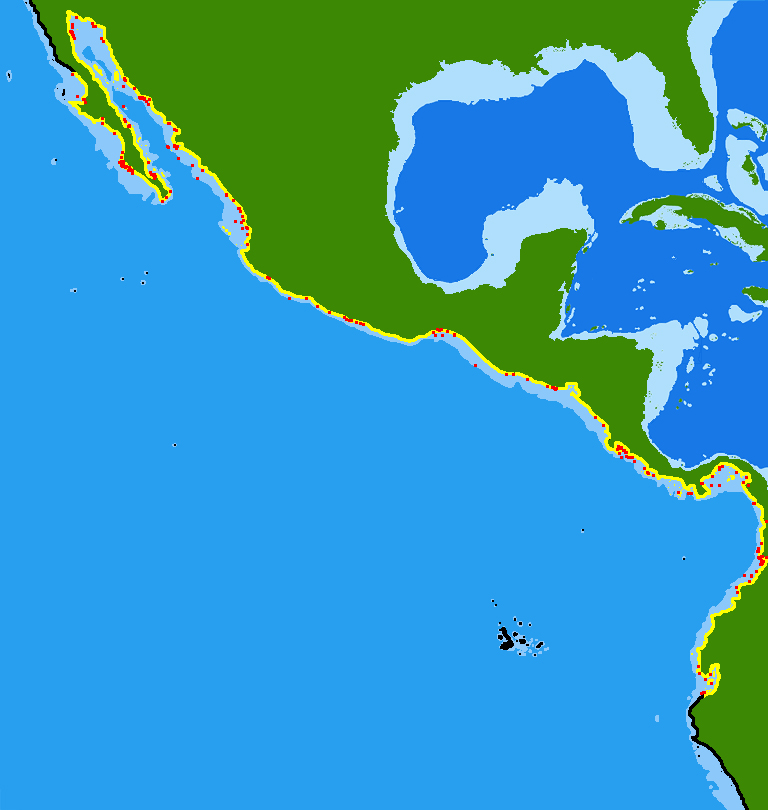

Synonyms
- Solea mazatlana Steindachner, 1869

= Achirus mazatlanus =

Species of fish

Achirus mazatlanus, the Mazatlan sole or Pacific lined sole, is a sole of the family Achiridae native to the eastern Pacific from northern Baja California and the Gulf of California to northernmost Peru. This demersal species can grow up to 22.5 cm (8.9 in). It is found at depths of 1–60 m in coastal lagoons and fresh water. Its diet consists of crustaceans, small fishes, polychaetes, and occasionally detritus.
