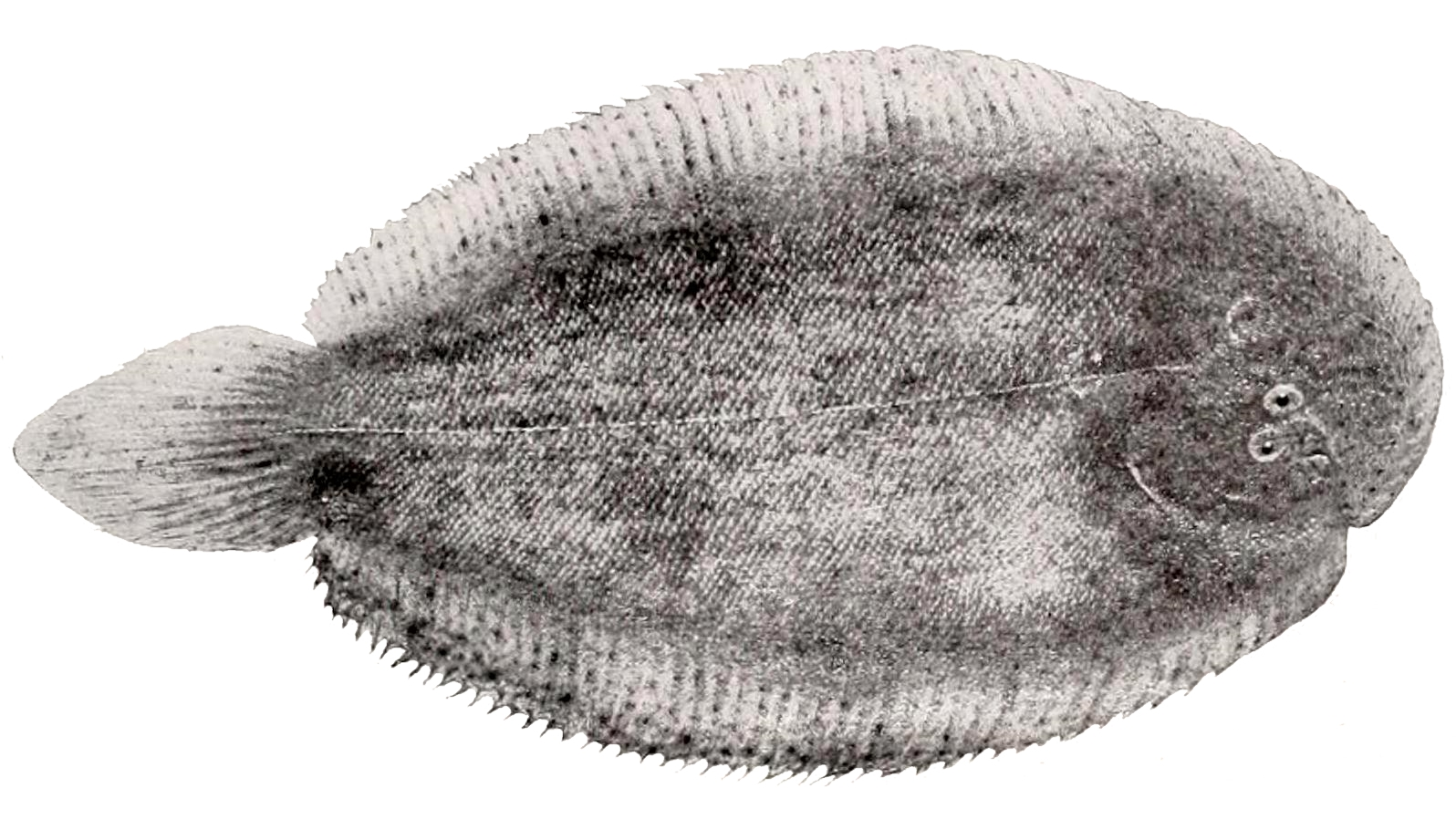

Conservation status
- Least Concern (IUCN 3.1)

Scientific classification
- Kingdom: Animalia
- Phylum: Chordata
- Class: Actinopterygii
- Division: Teleostei
- Order: Carangiformes
- Suborder: Pleuronectoidei
- Family: Achiridae
- Genus: Apionichthys
- Species: A. finis

Binomial name
- Apionichthys finis (Eigenmann, 1912)

Synonyms
- Soleonasus finis Eigenmann, 1912

= Apionichthys finis =

Species of fish

Apionichthys finis is a species of sole in the family Achiridae. It was described by Carl H. Eigenmann in 1912, originally under the genus Soleonasus. It inhabits the Essequibo, Potaro and Amazon rivers. It reaches a maximum standard length of 8.8 cm (3.5 in).
