= Apionichthys menezesi =

Conservation status
- Least Concern (IUCN 3.1)

Scientific classification
- Kingdom: Animalia
- Phylum: Chordata
- Class: Actinopterygii
- Division: Teleostei
- Order: Carangiformes
- Suborder: Pleuronectoidei
- Family: Achiridae
- Genus: Apionichthys
- Species: A. menezesi

Binomial name
- Apionichthys menezesi R. T. C. Ramos, 2003

Species of fish

Apionichthys menezesi is a species of sole in the family Achiridae. It was described by Robson Tamar da Costa Ramos in 2003. It inhabits the Amazon, Negro, Napo and Orinoco rivers. It reaches a maximum standard length of 6 cm (2.4 in).
