= Apionichthys seripierriae =

Scientific classification
- Domain: Eukaryota
- Kingdom: Animalia
- Phylum: Chordata
- Class: Actinopterygii
- Order: Carangiformes
- Suborder: Pleuronectoidei
- Family: Achiridae
- Genus: Apionichthys
- Species: A. seripierriae

Binomial name
- Apionichthys seripierriae R. T. C. Ramos, 2003

Species of fish

Apionichthys seripierriae is a species of sole in the family Achiridae. It was described by Robson Tamar da Costa Ramos in 2003. It is found in the Amazon River. It reaches a maximum standard length of 8.8 cm (3.5 in).

The species epithet "seripierriae" was given in honour of Dione Seripierri, the head librarian at the Museum of Zoology of the University of São Paulo in Brazil.
