= Apionichthys nattereri =

Conservation status
- Least Concern (IUCN 3.1)

Scientific classification
- Kingdom: Animalia
- Phylum: Chordata
- Class: Actinopterygii
- Division: Teleostei
- Order: Carangiformes
- Suborder: Pleuronectoidei
- Family: Achiridae
- Genus: Apionichthys
- Species: A. nattereri

Binomial name
- Apionichthys nattereri (Steindachner, 1876)

Synonyms
- Solea nattereri Steindachner, 1876; Achiropsis normani Chabanaud, 1928; Achiropsis nattereri (Steindachner, 1876)

Species of fish

Apionichthys nattereri is a species of sole in the family Achiridae. It was described by Franz Steindachner in 1876, originally under the genus Solea. It inhabits the Amazon River. It reaches a maximum standard length of 23.4 cm (9.2 in).

Due to a lack of known major threats to the species, A. nattereri is currently ranked as Least Concern by the IUCN Redlist.

== Etymology ==
The fish is named for Johann Natterer.
