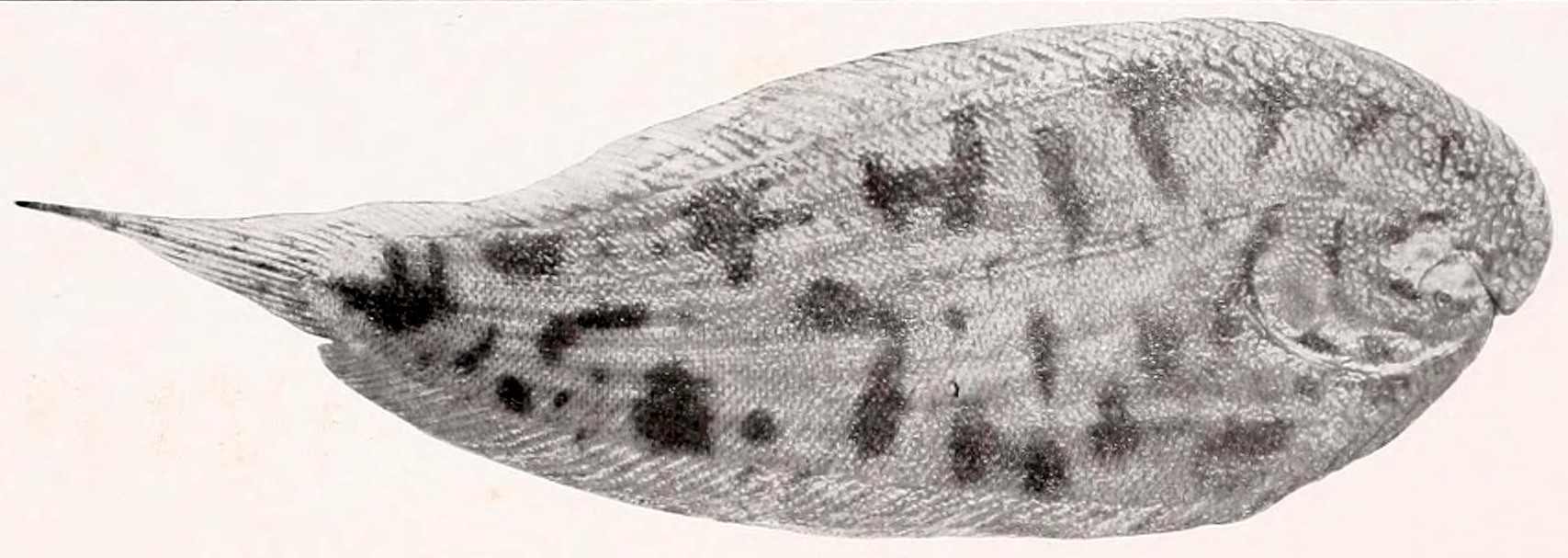

Conservation status
- Least Concern (IUCN 3.1)

Scientific classification
- Kingdom: Animalia
- Phylum: Chordata
- Class: Actinopterygii
- Division: Teleostei
- Order: Carangiformes
- Suborder: Pleuronectoidei
- Family: Achiridae
- Genus: Apionichthys
- Species: A. dumerili

Binomial name
- Apionichthys dumerili Kaup, 1858

Synonyms
- Apionichthys bleekeri Horst, 1879; Apionichthys nebulosus Peters, 1869; Apionichthys unicolor (Günther, 1862); Apionichthys ottonis Steindachner, 1868; Soleotalpa unicolor Günther, 1862

= Longtail sole =

Species of fish

The longtail sole (Apionichthys dumerili) is a species of sole in the family Achiridae. It was described by Johann Jakob Kaup in 1858. It inhabits the Amazon, Corantijn, Grajaú, Orinoco, and Oyapock rivers. It dwells at a depth range of 1 to 10 m (0 to 30 ft). It reaches a maximum total length of 15 cm (5.9 in), more commonly reaching a TL of 11 cm (4.3 in).

The longtail sole is currently ranked as Least Concern by the IUCN redlist, due to a lack of known major threats, although it notes that the species is harvested as bycatch in shrimp trawls at an undetermined rate. The longtail sole is also marketed in the aquarium hobby.
