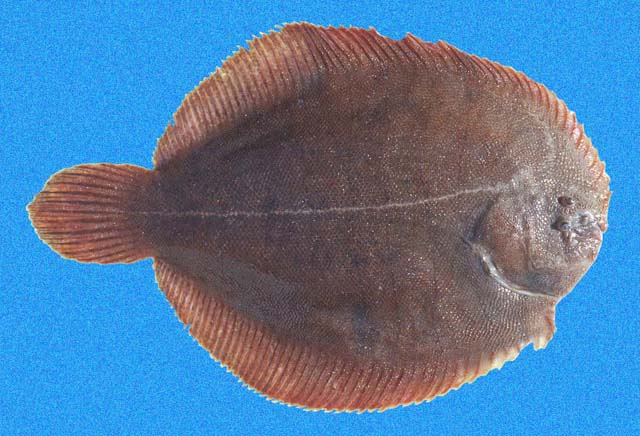

Conservation status
- Least Concern (IUCN 3.1)

Scientific classification
- Kingdom: Animalia
- Phylum: Chordata
- Class: Actinopterygii
- Order: Carangiformes
- Suborder: Pleuronectoidei
- Family: Achiridae
- Genus: Achirus
- Species: A. klunzingeri

Binomial name
- Achirus klunzingeri (Steindachner, 1880)
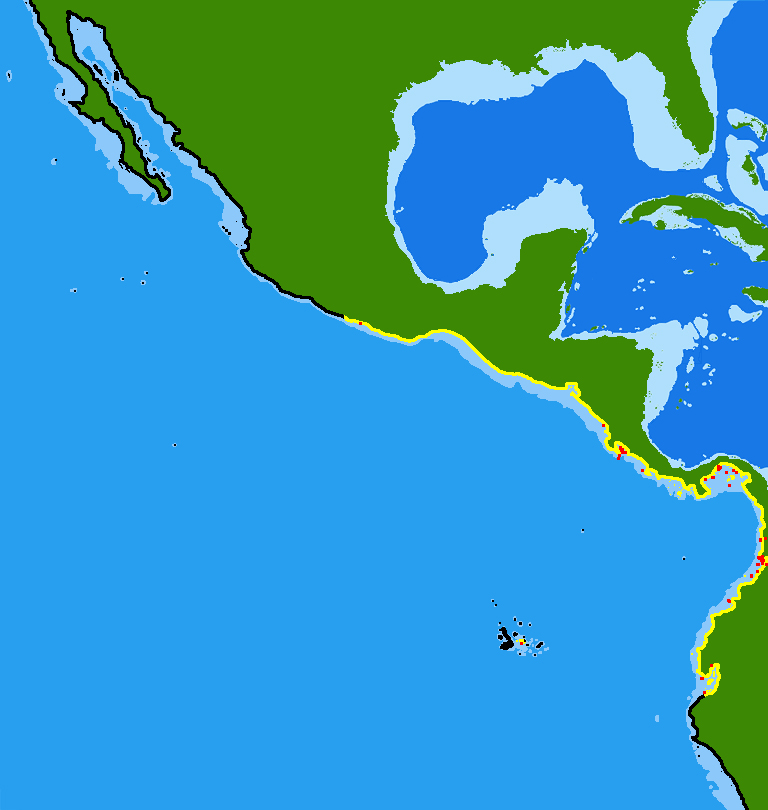
- Range in yellow

Synonyms
- Solea klunzingeri Steindachner, 1880

= Achirus klunzingeri =

Species of fish

The brown sole (Achirus klunzingeri) is a sole of the genus Achirus native to the eastern Pacific from central Mexico to northernmost Peru. This demersal species growth up to 23 cm (9.1 in). It is found at depths of 10–40 m on sandy and muddy grounds and may enter fresh waters in estuaries and mangroves. Its diet consists of invertebrates, small fishes, pelagic eggs and larvae.
