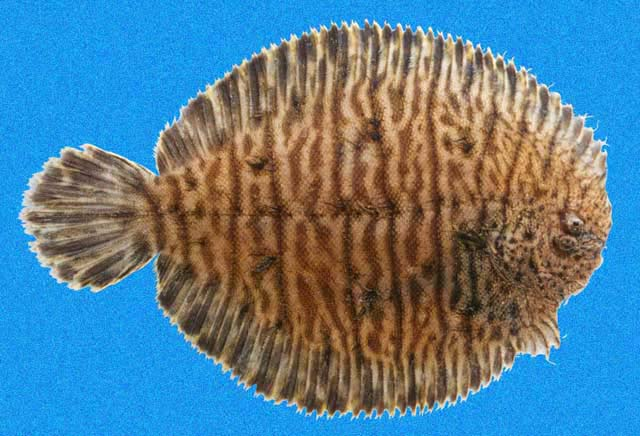

Conservation status
- Least Concern (IUCN 3.1)

Scientific classification
- Kingdom: Animalia
- Phylum: Chordata
- Class: Actinopterygii
- Order: Carangiformes
- Suborder: Pleuronectoidei
- Family: Achiridae
- Genus: Achirus
- Species: A. scutum

Binomial name
- Achirus scutum (Günther, 1862)
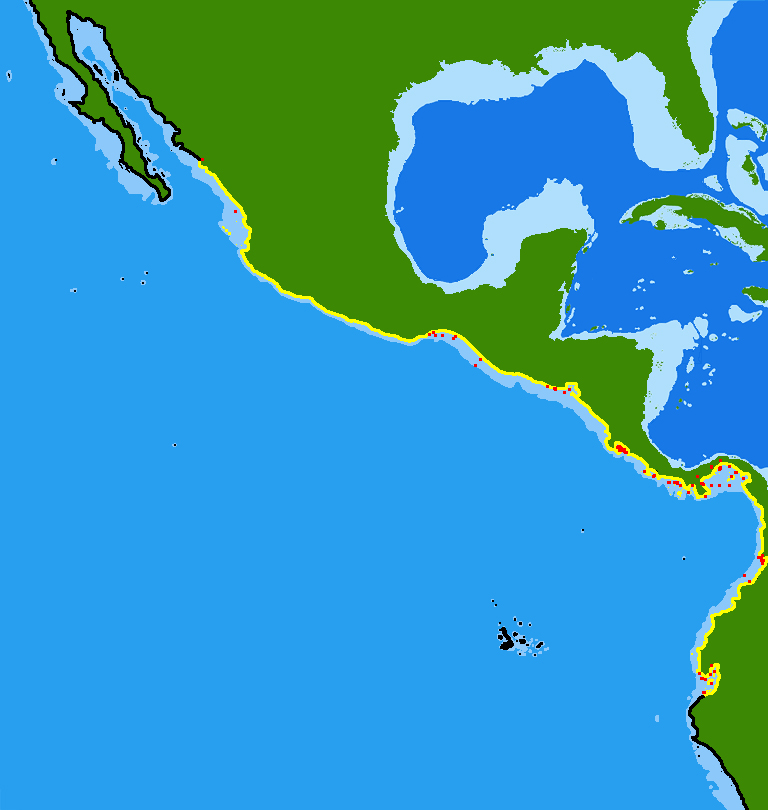

Synonyms
- Solea scutum Günther, 1862

= Achirus scutum =

Species of fish

The network sole (Achirus scutum) is a sole of the genus Achirus native to the eastern Pacific from the tip of Baja California and the southeastern Gulf of California to northern Peru. This demersal species growth up to 28 cm (11 in) (typically 13 cm). It is found at depths 5–45 m in coastal lagoons and fresh water. Its diet consists of crustaceans, small fishes, polychaetes, and occasionally detritus.
