= Gymnachirus melas =

Conservation status
- Least Concern (IUCN 3.1)

Scientific classification
- Kingdom: Animalia
- Phylum: Chordata
- Class: Actinopterygii
- Order: Carangiformes
- Suborder: Pleuronectoidei
- Family: Achiridae
- Genus: Gymnachirus
- Species: G. melas

Binomial name
- Gymnachirus melas Nichols, 1916

Species of fish

Gymnachirus melas, the North American naked sole, also known as the naked sole, is a species of sole in the family Achiridae. It was described by John Treadwell Nichols in 1916. It is known from Mexico, Cuba, the Bahamas, and the United States. It dwells at a depth range of 2 to 185 metres (10 to 610 ft). It reaches a maximum length of 22 cm (8.7 in).

Due to a lack of known threats to its population, the North American naked sole is currently ranked as Least Concern by the IUCN redlist. It is caught as bycatch in shrimp and other trawls. It is of minor interest in commercial fisheries.
