= Achirus zebrinus =

Conservation status
- Least Concern (IUCN 3.1)

Scientific classification
- Kingdom: Animalia
- Phylum: Chordata
- Class: Actinopterygii
- Order: Carangiformes
- Suborder: Pleuronectoidei
- Family: Achiridae
- Genus: Achirus
- Species: A. zebrinus

Binomial name
- Achirus zebrinus H. W. Clark, 1936

Synonyms
- Trinectes zebrinus (Clark, 1936)

Species of fish

Achirus zebrinus is a species of sole in the family Achiridae. It was described by Howard Walton Clark in 1936. It is only known from Gulf of Tehuantepec and nearby lagoons in the Pacific coast of southern Mexico. It is a demersal species most commonly found at the depths of 21–40 m (69–131 ft). It is locally common and caught as bycatch in shrimp fisheries.

Achirus zebrinus can grow to at least 18.2 cm (7.2 in) standard length.
