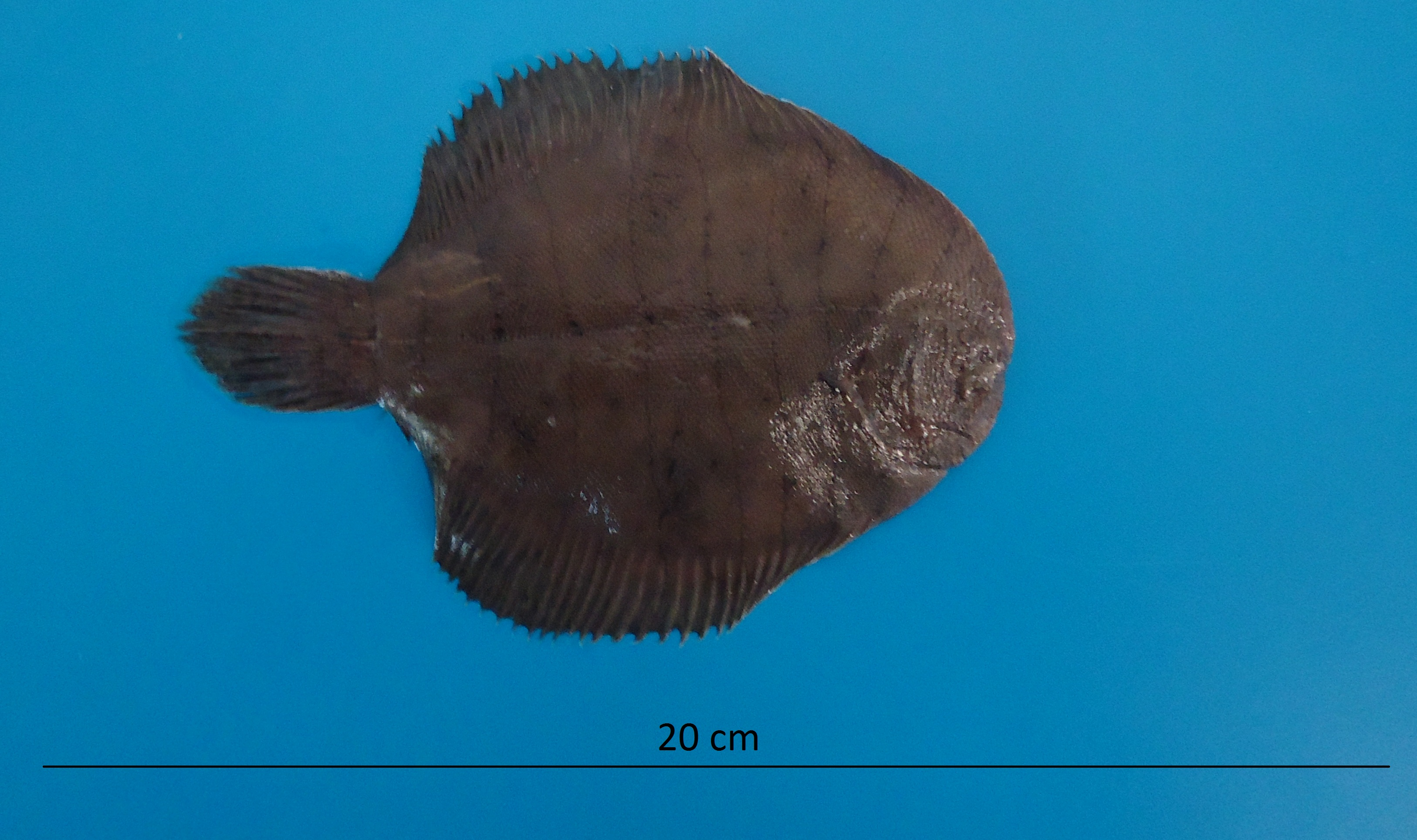

Conservation status
- Least Concern (IUCN 3.1)

Scientific classification
- Kingdom: Animalia
- Phylum: Chordata
- Class: Actinopterygii
- Order: Carangiformes
- Suborder: Pleuronectoidei
- Family: Achiridae
- Genus: Achirus
- Species: A. declivis

Binomial name
- Achirus declivis Chabanaud, 1940
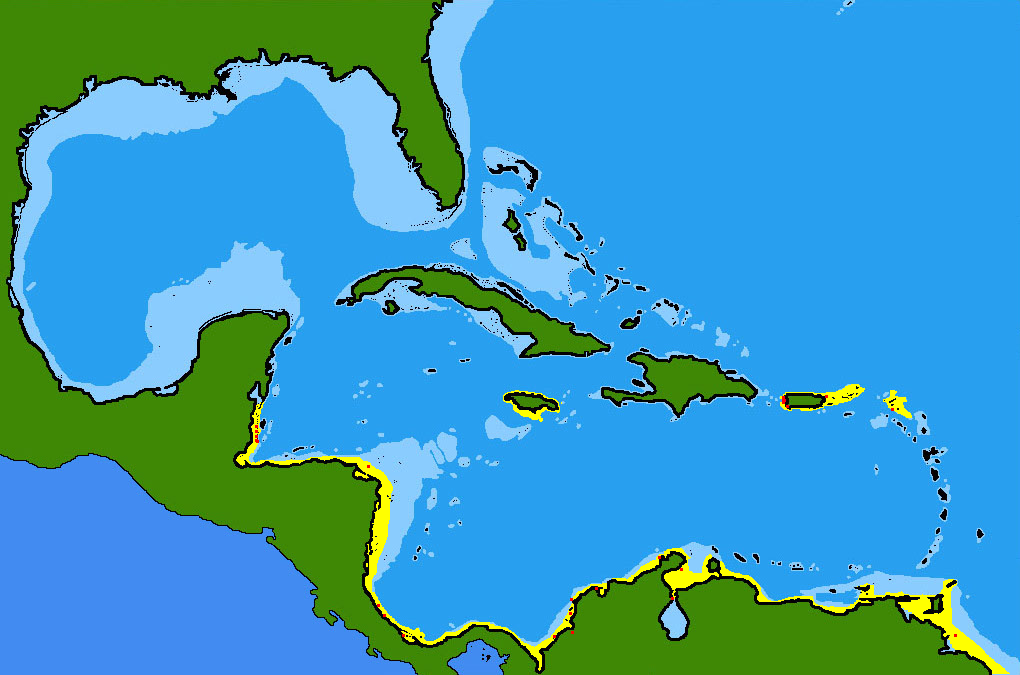

= Achirus declivis =

Species of fish

Achirus declivis, the plainfin sole, is a sole of the family Achiridae native to the western Atlantic in the Caribbean Sea and along the coast of the Americas from Belize to Santa Catarina, Brazil. This demersal species inhabits soft bottoms near the shores or estuaries. It can grow up to 18.7 cm (7.4 in).
