= Achirus novoae =

Scientific classification
- Domain: Eukaryota
- Kingdom: Animalia
- Phylum: Chordata
- Class: Actinopterygii
- Order: Carangiformes
- Suborder: Pleuronectoidei
- Family: Achiridae
- Genus: Achirus
- Species: A. novoae

Binomial name
- Achirus novoae Cervigón, 1982

Species of fish

Achirus novoae is a species of sole in the family Achiridae. It was described by Fernando Cervigón in 1982. It inhabits the Orinoco River. It reaches a maximum length of 10.6 cm (4.2 in).
