= Gymnachirus nudus =

Scientific classification
- Kingdom: Animalia
- Phylum: Chordata
- Class: Actinopterygii
- Order: Carangiformes
- Suborder: Pleuronectoidei
- Family: Achiridae
- Genus: Gymnachirus
- Species: G. nudus

Binomial name
- Gymnachirus nudus Kaup, 1858

Synonyms
- Gynmachirus nudus Kaup, 1858

Species of fish

Gymnachirus nudus, the naked sole, also known as the flabby sole, is a species of sole in the family Achiridae. It was described by Johann Jakob Kaup in 1858. It is known from throughout the western Atlantic. It dwells on soft bottoms at a depth range of 2 to 100 m (6.6 to 328.1 ft). It reaches a maximum total length of 15 cm (5.9 in), more commonly reaching a TL of 12 cm (4.7 in).

The naked sole is currently ranked as Least Concern by the IUCN redlist because of a lack of known threats to the species, although it makes note that it is sometimes harvested as bycatch in trawls for shrimp and other fish.

== Distribution ==
Muddy bottoms of the Western Atlantic, from Florida to northern South America.
