= Achirus mucuri =

Conservation status
- Endangered (IUCN 3.1)

Scientific classification
- Kingdom: Animalia
- Phylum: Chordata
- Class: Actinopterygii
- Order: Carangiformes
- Suborder: Pleuronectoidei
- Family: Achiridae
- Genus: Achirus
- Species: A. mucuri

Binomial name
- Achirus mucuri R. T. C. Ramos, T. P. A. Ramos & P. R. D. Lopes, 2009

Species of fish

The American sole (Achirus mucuri) is a species of sole in the family Achiridae. It was described by Robson Tamar da Costa Ramos, Telton Pedro Anselmo Ramos and Paulo Roberto Duarte Lopes in 2009. It inhabits the Mucuri River in Brazil, from which its species epithet is derived. It reaches a maximum standard length of 9 cm (3.5 in).
