= Catathyridium grandirivi =

Scientific classification
- Domain: Eukaryota
- Kingdom: Animalia
- Phylum: Chordata
- Class: Actinopterygii
- Order: Carangiformes
- Suborder: Pleuronectoidei
- Family: Achiridae
- Genus: Catathyridium
- Species: C. grandirivi

Binomial name
- Catathyridium grandirivi (Chabanaud, 1928)

Synonyms
- Baeostoma grandirivi Chabanaud, 1928

Species of fish

Catathyridium grandirivi is a species of sole in the family Achiridae. It was described by Paul Chabanaud at 1928, originally under the genus Baeostoma. It is known from Brazil. It reaches a maximum standard length of 11.5 cm (4.5 in).
