= Apionichthys sauli =

Conservation status
- Least Concern (IUCN 3.1)

Scientific classification
- Kingdom: Animalia
- Phylum: Chordata
- Class: Actinopterygii
- Division: Teleostei
- Order: Carangiformes
- Suborder: Pleuronectoidei
- Family: Achiridae
- Genus: Apionichthys
- Species: A. sauli

Binomial name
- Apionichthys sauli R. T. C. Ramos, 2003

Species of fish

Apionichthys sauli is a species of sole in the family Achiridae. It was described by Robson Tamar da Costa Ramos in 2003. It inhabits the Orinoco and Meta rivers in South America. It reaches a maximum standard length of 7 cm (2.8 in).

The species epithet "sauli" was given in honour of William G. Saul, a former curator in the ichthyology department at the Academy of Natural Sciences of Drexel University in Philadelphia, credited as one of the collectors of the type material for the species.
