= Catathyridium jenynsii =

Scientific classification
- Domain: Eukaryota
- Kingdom: Animalia
- Phylum: Chordata
- Class: Actinopterygii
- Order: Carangiformes
- Suborder: Pleuronectoidei
- Family: Achiridae
- Genus: Catathyridium
- Species: C. jenynsii

Binomial name
- Catathyridium jenynsii (Günther, 1862)

Synonyms
- Solea jenynsii Günther, 1862; Achirus errans Miranda Ribeiro, 1915; Achirus jenynsi (Günther, 1862); Achirus jenynsii (Günther, 1862); Achirus trichospilus Berg, 1895

Species of fish

Catathyridium jenynsii is a species of sole in the family Achiridae. It was described by Albert Günther in 1862, originally under the genus Solea. It inhabits the Paraná and Uruguay rivers. It reaches a maximum length of 23.7 cm (9.3 in).
