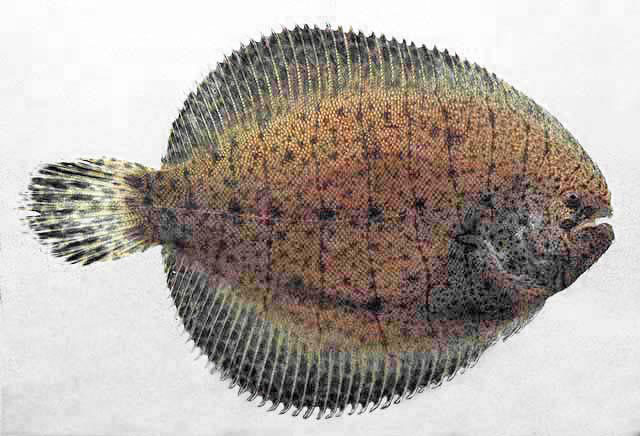
- Top side
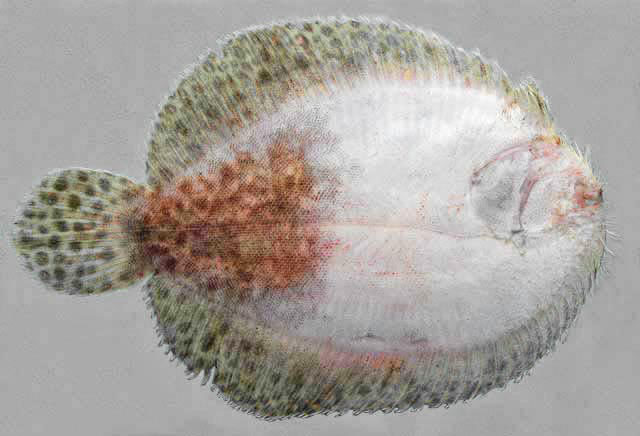
- Underside

Conservation status
- Least Concern (IUCN 3.1)

Scientific classification
- Kingdom: Animalia
- Phylum: Chordata
- Class: Actinopterygii
- Division: Teleostei
- Order: Carangiformes
- Suborder: Pleuronectoidei
- Family: Achiridae
- Genus: Achirus
- Species: A. lineatus

Binomial name
- Achirus lineatus (Linnaeus, 1758)
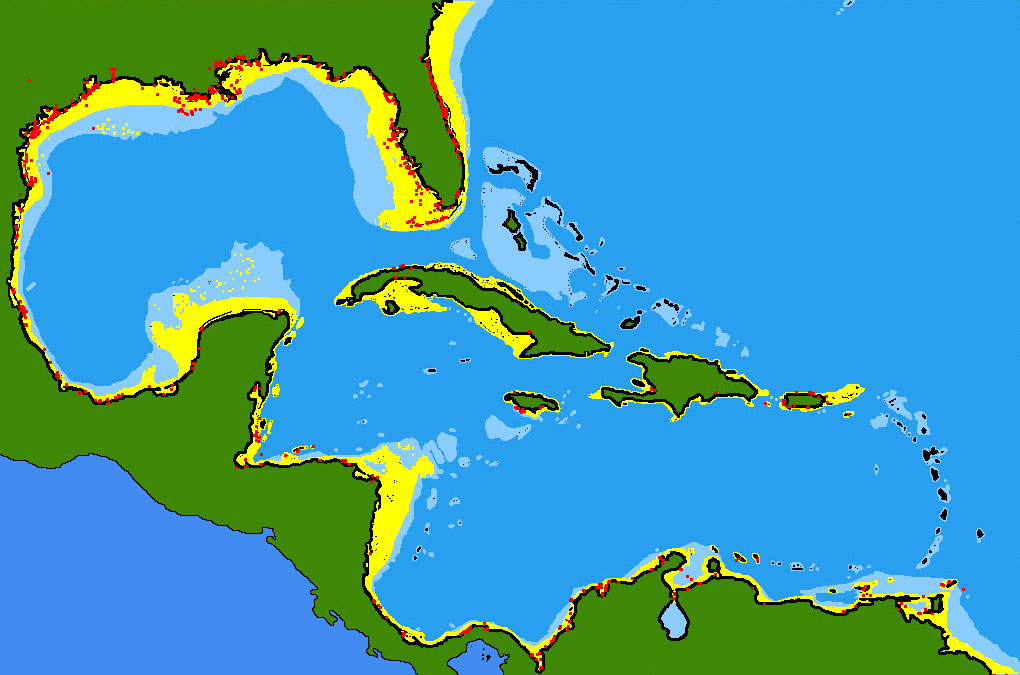

Synonyms
- Pleuronectes lineatus Linnaeus, 1758; Pleuronectes nigricans Bloch & Schneider, 1801

= Achirus lineatus =

Species of fish

The lined sole (Achirus lineatus) is a ray-finned flatfish found in the Western Atlantic. Its common length is 17 cm. Often considered a trash fish in commercial trawling, it is of little or no economic value.

== Diet and habitat ==
This species feeds on worms, crustaceans and small fishes, and occurs mainly in brackish or hypersaline lagoons, or on sandy-muddy bottoms of estuaries, as well as the littoral zone. It hides itself in the substrate, leaving its eyes uncovered to view prey and predators. It can easily disguise itself in the environment and can be associated with reefs and be found at depths to 20 m.

== Reproduction and lifecycle ==
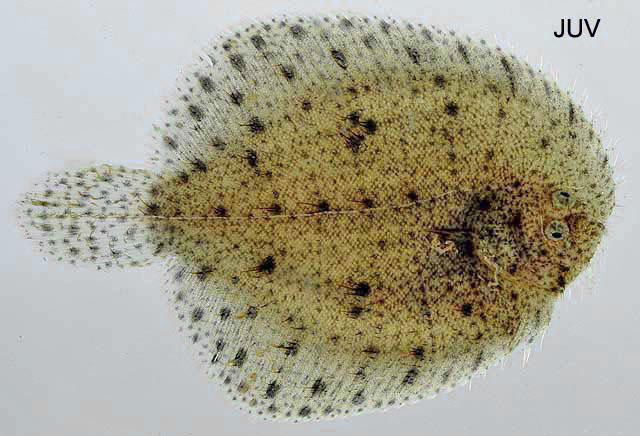
Juvenile

Reproduction appears to occur year-round, at least in some portions of the animal's range. Juveniles have a brief planktonic life, moving quickly to the benthic stage. Its growth rate is relatively slow.

== Distribution ==
Commonly, it is caught in the Western Atlantic bight: Florida and northern Gulf of Mexico to northern Argentina. A. lineatus is a broadly euryhaline species, having a wide salinity tolerance. Individuals have been collected in near-fresh water from the upper portions of the St. Lucie and Caloosahatchee estuaries, Florida.

== Common misidentified species ==
Careful examination allows A. lineatus and other right-eyed achirids to be distinguished from all co-occurring flatfish of the families Bothidae (lefteye flounders) and Cynoglossidae (tonguefishes), all of which have the left side up. The right-eyed flounders of family Pleuronectidae typically inhabit colder waters than A. lineatus. Within the Achiridae, the absence of vertical body bars should be sufficient to distinguish A. lineatus from three co-occurring species, the naked sole (Gymnachirus melas) and fringed sole (G. texae). The lined sole is sometimes confused with the hogchoker, (Trinectes maculatus) which is distinguished (at over 15 mm total length) by the latter's total lack of pectoral fin rays. Lined sole are also easily differentiated from scrawled sole (Trinectes inscriptus), whose side-up body is covered by a network of irregular dark lines.

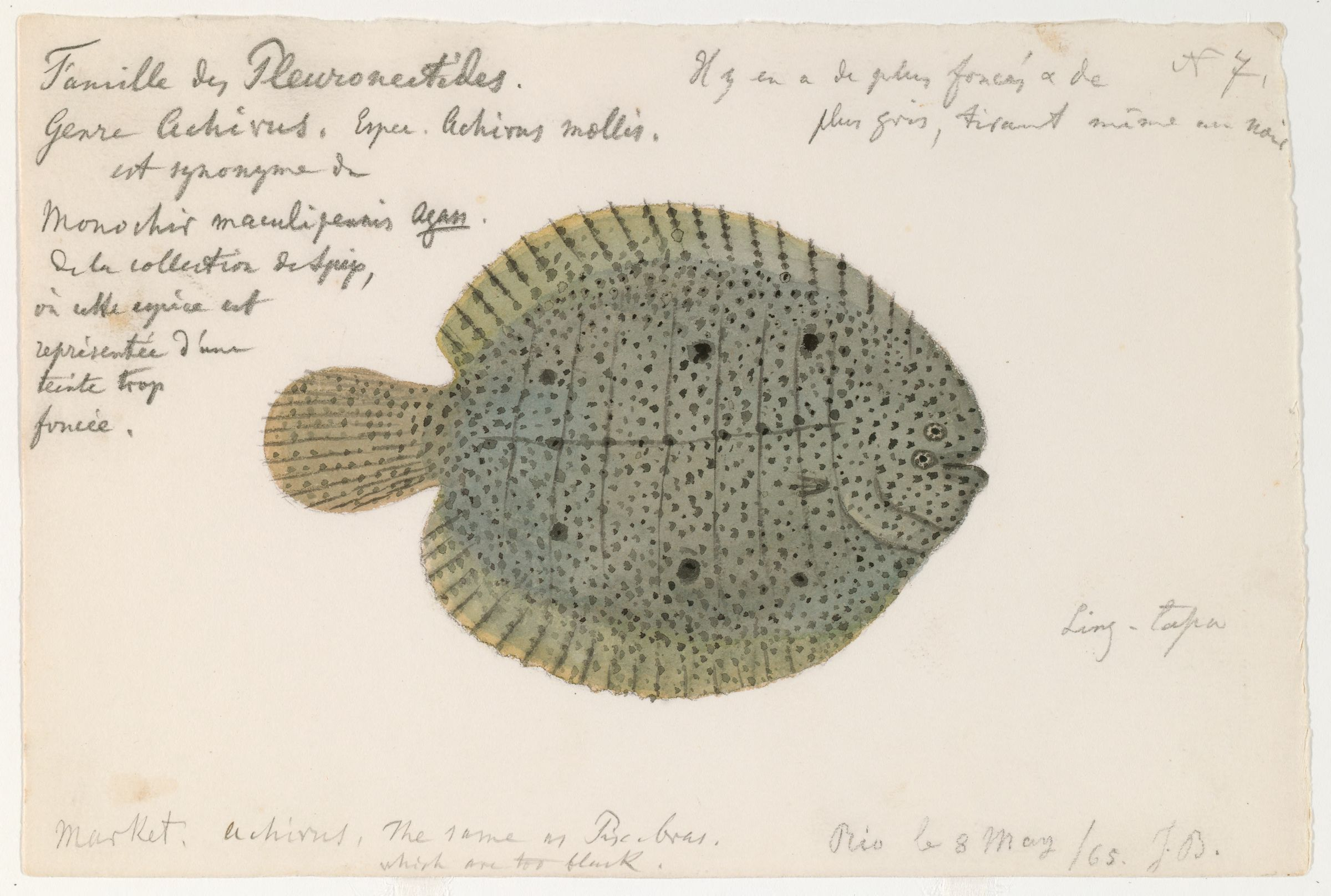
An 1865 lined sole watercolor painting by Jacques Burkhardt.
