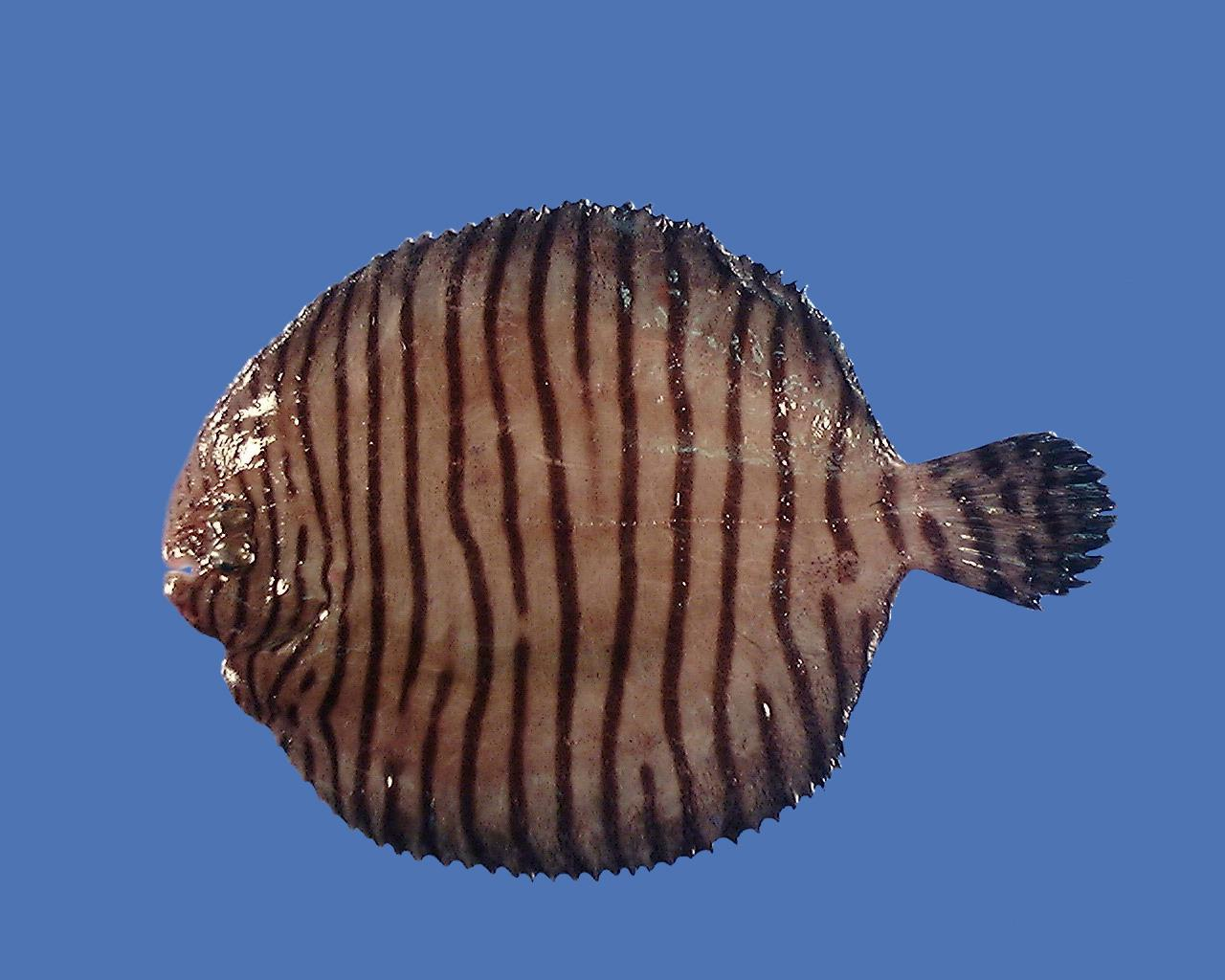
- Gulf of Mexico Fringed Sole (G. texae)

Scientific classification
- Domain: Eukaryota
- Kingdom: Animalia
- Phylum: Chordata
- Class: Actinopterygii
- Order: Carangiformes
- Suborder: Pleuronectoidei
- Family: Achiridae
- Genus: Gymnachirus; Kaup, 1858

Type species
- Gymnachirus nudus Kaup, 1858

Synonyms
- Nodogymnus Chabanaud, 1928

= Gymnachirus =

Genus of fishes

Gymnachirus is a genus of American soles native to the Atlantic coast of the Americas.

== Species ==
The currently recognized species in this genus are:

- Gymnachirus melas Nichols, 1916 (North American naked sole)
- Gymnachirus nudus Kaup, 1858 (naked sole)
- Gymnachirus texae (Gunter, 1936) (Gulf of Mexico fringed sole)
