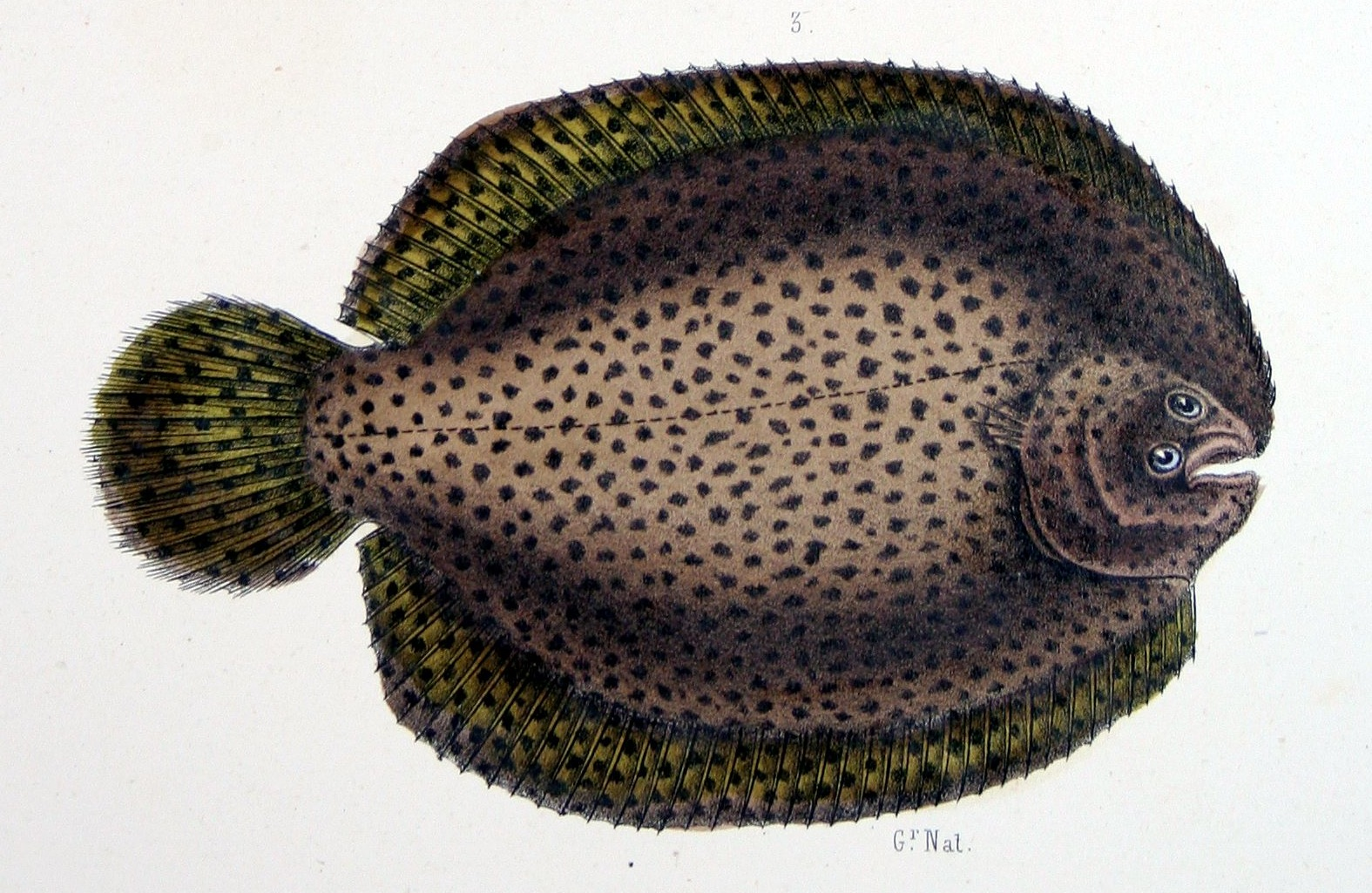

Conservation status
- Least Concern (IUCN 3.1)

Scientific classification
- Kingdom: Animalia
- Phylum: Chordata
- Class: Actinopterygii
- Division: Teleostei
- Order: Carangiformes
- Suborder: Pleuronectoidei
- Family: Achiridae
- Genus: Achirus
- Species: A. achirus

Binomial name
- Achirus achirus Linnaeus, 1758
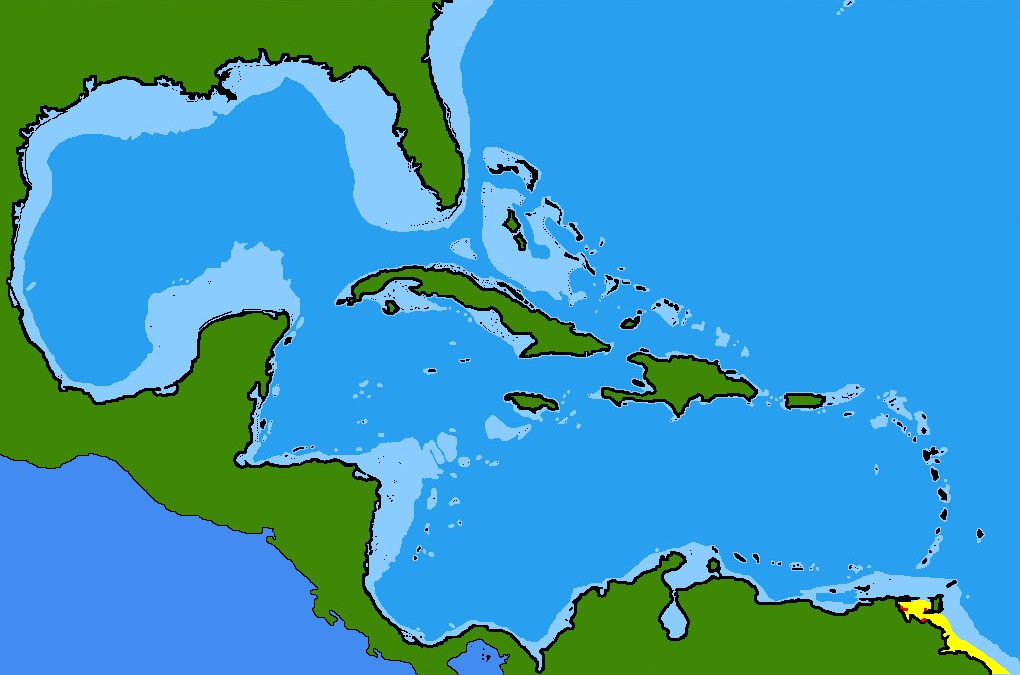

Synonyms
- Pleuronectes achirus Linnaeus, 1758; Monochirus lineatus Quoy & Gaimard, 1824; Monochir punctifer Castelnau, 1855

= Achirus achirus =

Drab sole

Species of fish

Achirus achirus, the drab sole, is a brackish water-dwelling sole of the genus Achirus native to the waters of South America, the Gulf of Mexico, and the Caribbean Sea. The drab sole is also commonly used by humans as an aquarium fish.

== Biology ==
The drab sole, like most flatfish, has both eyes on the same side of its head as an adult. It is brown with green fins and the body (including the fins) is covered in black spots. It can grow to a size of 37 cm (although they average only about 30 cm) and have been recorded as weighing up to 1 kg. The fish is an obligate carnivore and its diet consists of various smaller finfish and crustaceans living in the sediment.

== Environment ==
The drab sole is a type of flatfish that lives on the bottoms of brackish and freshwater rivers and estuaries around the Gulf of Mexico and along the coast of South America. It dwells generally in only shallow water, living in areas of about 1–20 meters in depth.

== Aquarium use ==
The drab sole is sometimes used as an aquarium fish. While sometimes advertised as being a freshwater fish and capable of surviving in freshwater, in fact it usually requires some amount of salt for it to remain in the best possible state of health. It requires a tank of at least 100 gallons at a temperature of 72-85 degrees Fahrenheit, and it usually gets along well with other fish. The drab sole is carnivorous, and while it will not prey on other fish it requires a meat-based diet (worms or small fish work well).
