= NOAAS Chapman =

American fisheries research vessel

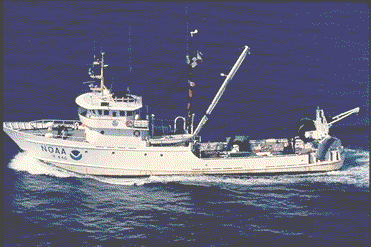
- NOAAS Chapman (R 446)

History

United States
- Name: NOAAS Chapman (R 446)
- Namesake: Wilbert McLeod "Wib" Chapman (1910-1970), American fisheries scientist
- Builder: Bender Shipbuilding and Repair Company, Mobile, Alabama
- Cost: $3,100,000 (USD)
- Launched: December 1979
- Acquired: May 1980 (delivery)
- Commissioned: 11 July 1980
- Decommissioned: 2 June 1998
- Home port: Pascagoula, Mississippi
- Identification: IMO number: 7907051; MMSI number: 306082000; Callsign: WTED
- Fate: Donated to University of Puerto Rico; Purchased by Substation Curaçao 2008

General characteristics
- Type: Fisheries research ship
- Tonnage: 427 gross tons; 290 net tons
- Displacement: 520 tons
- Length: 127 ft (39 m)
- Beam: 29.6 ft (9.0 m)
- Draft: 14.0 ft (4.3 m)
- Propulsion: One 1,250-shp (932-kW) D 339 geared diesel engine, one four-bladed controllable-pitch propeller, one 150-hp (112-kW) Omnithruster bow thruster
- Speed: 9 knots (17 km/h)
- Range: 3,020 nautical miles (5,590 km)
- Endurance: 14 days
- Boats & landing craft carried: One 16 ft (4.9 m) open boat
- Complement: 11, plus up to 6 scientists

NOAAS Chapman (R 446) was an American fisheries research vessel that was in commission in the National Oceanic and Atmospheric Administration (NOAA) fleet from 1980 to 1998. After the conclusion of her NOAA career, she spent several years operating as the University of Puerto Rico marine research vessel R/V Chapman. More recently, she has become the Curaçao-based mothership for the deep-diving submarine Curasub.

== Construction and commissioning ==
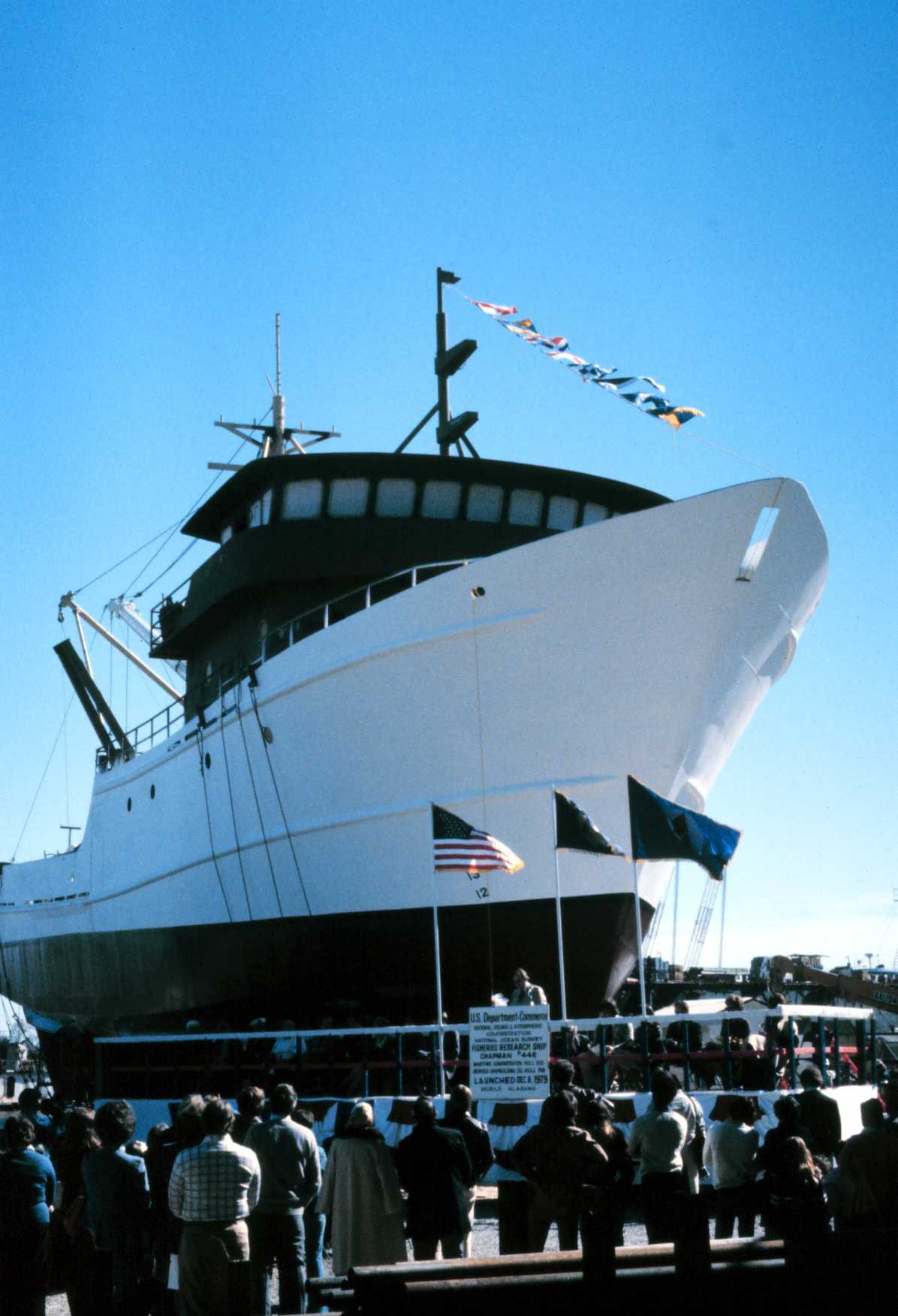
The launching ceremony for NOAAS Chapman (R 446) at the Bender Shipbuilding and Repair Company in Mobile, Alabama, in December 1979.

Chapman was built by the Bender Shipbuilding and Repair Company at Mobile, Alabama. She was launched in December 1979, delivered to NOAA in May 1980, and commissioned into service in NOAA's fleet as NOAAS Chapman (R 446) on 11 July 1980 at NOAA's Pacific Marine Center in Seattle Washington.

== Characteristics and capabilities ==
Chapman had a 4-foot (1.2-meter) fixed-length boom with a lifting capacity of 7,500 pounds (3,402 kg) and an A-frame with a safe working load of 1,000 pounds (450 kg). She also had two hydraulic trawl winches, each with a drum capacity of 6,000 feet (1,800 meters) of 3/4-inch (19-mm) line and a maximum pull of 20,000 pounds (9,100 kg), a hydraulic net sonde winch with a drum capacity of 3,937 feet (1,200 meters) and a maximum pull of 500 pounds (230 kg), and a hydraulic oceanographic winch with a drum capacity of 3,250 feet (990 meters) of 3/16-inch (4.8-mm) steel cable and a maximum pull of 84 pounds (38 kg).

Chapman carried a 16-foot (4.9-meter) Boston Whaler fiberglass boat powered by a gasoline outboard motor.

In addition to her crew of 11, Chapman could accommodate up to six scientists.

== Service history ==
Operated by NOAA's Office of Marine and Aviation Operations, Chapman conducted fishery and marine resource research supporting the research of NOAA's National Marine Fisheries Service (NMFS), collecting fish and crustacean specimens using trawls and benthic longlines and fish larvae, fish eggs, and plankton using plankton nets and surface and midwater larval nets.

Chapman spent her first four years operating in the North Pacific Ocean and Bering Sea on a variety of projects in support of NMFS's Northwest Fisheries Science Center and Alaska Fisheries Science Center. She conducted a survey of the Bering Sea king crab population each summer which was used to set king crab catch quotas for the following autumn.

In November 1984, Chapman moved to her new home port at Pascagoula, Mississippi, and for the remainder of her NOAA career she was devoted exclusively to supporting the Pascagoula Laboratory at NMFS's Southeast Fisheries Science Center, operating in the Gulf of Mexico, Caribbean Sea, and western Atlantic Ocean. Her first assignment was to explore the fishery potential of underutilized stocks of Gulf butterfish, squid, and coastal herring. In work closely connected with the emerging field of satellite imagery data acquisition and its application in fisheries science, she located commercially valuable concentrations of these species and characterized and monitored their populations.

During her career, Chapman dredged for scallops and trawled for cod off the coast of New England, and conducted winter tagging of striped bass off the Outer Banks of North Carolina. She also made physical oceanographic measurements and plankton collections in the Gulf Stream and the Loop Current, collected red tide organisms, and observed marine mammals.

Chapman also tested new designs in fishing gear and the sensors and equipment used to measure and monitor fishing gear performance, and used towed – and later remotely operated – submersibles to observe the performance of fishing gear she was testing. Scientists embarked on Chapman pioneered and developed the capability to measure fish populations using fishery acoustic systems. During her later years, Chapman used fishery acoustic systems to locate spawning aggregations of grouper and to characterize reef fish habitats during annual surveys under the Southeast Area Monitoring and Assessment Program (SEAMAP).

As an alternative to the often environmentally damaging methods of trawling and dredging, scientists aboard Chapman pioneered the use of fixed video cameras deployed on sensitive reef habitats to collect information on the kinds and abundance of reef fishes in a non-destructive manner, a novel approach in fishery data collection. Employing this technique off the Atlantic coast of Florida, Chapman conducted baseline studies of coral reefs that led to the establishment of the Experimental Oculina Research Reserve, one of the first such reserves of its kind.

After nearly 18 years of service, Chapman was decommissioned at Pascagoula on 2 June 1998. She was replaced by NOAAS Gordon Gunter (R 336).

== Later career ==
Donated to the University of Puerto Rico, the ship continued to serve as a research vessel as R/V Chapman, taking scientists and students to sea under the auspices of the university to conduct various kinds of marine research. However, she was not properly maintained, and after less than six years she lost her American Bureau of Shipping safety rating and was taken out of service.

In 2008, Substation Curaçao purchased Chapman to refurbish her and modify her for use as a seagoing mothership for the deep-diving scientific and tourist submarine Curasub. Modifications involved the installation of amenities for embarked scientists and tourists and of a 110-ton knuckle boom crane on Chapman's after deck to launch and retrieve both the submarine and its floating dock, both of which can be carried on Chapman's after deck. During submarine operations, the floating dock is lowered over the side and secured to Chapman so that Curasub's passengers have an easy and convenient way to embark on and disembark from the submarine without the danger of launching Curasub into the water with them already aboard; Curasub also is lowered over the side and operates from the floating dock, which includes a docking cradle for the submarine. Chapman's redesign also made provision for the temporary installation of two 20-foot (6.1-meter) intermodal containers, one configured for use as a wet laboratory and the other for use as a dry laboratory, which can be carried on her deck when needed for the support of embarked scientists and stored ashore during tourist use of Curasub.

Operating from Curaçao, Chapman had begun operations under Chapman Expeditions serving as Curasub's mothership by 2012, when she supported the Smithsonian Institution's Deep Reef Observation Project (DROP).

== See also ==
- NOAA ships and aircraft
