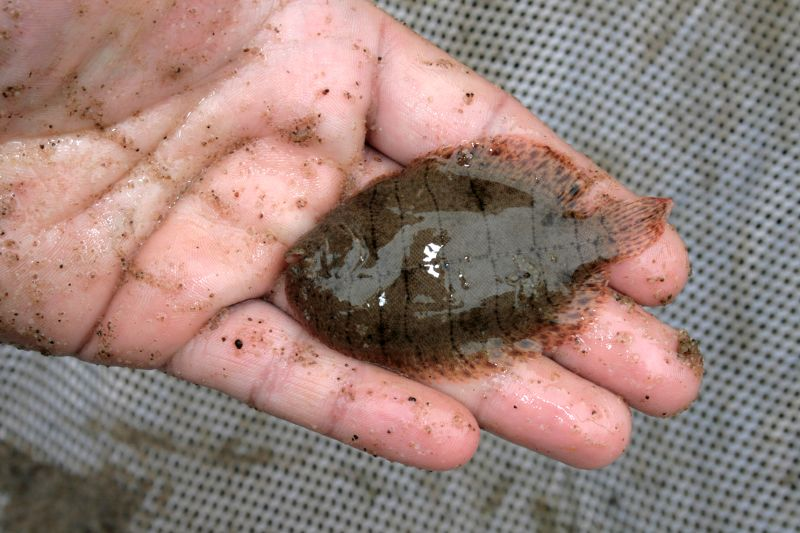
- Hogchoker (T. maculatus)

Scientific classification
- Kingdom: Animalia
- Phylum: Chordata
- Class: Actinopterygii
- Order: Carangiformes
- Suborder: Pleuronectoidei
- Family: Achiridae
- Genus: Trinectes; Rafinesque, 1832

Type species
- Trinectes scabra Rafinesque 1832

Synonyms
- Verconectes Whitley, 1931

= Trinectes =

Genus of fishes

Trinectes is a genus of American soles native to the Americas. Most species are coastal, occurring in both salt and brackish water, but several may enter fresh water and one, T. hubbsbollinger, is restricted to rivers. They are fairly small, with the largest species only reaching 25 cm (9.8 in) in length.

== Species ==
The currently recognised species in this genus are:

- Trinectes fimbriatus (Günther, 1862) (fringed sole)
- Trinectes fluviatilis (Meek & Hildebrand, 1928) (freshwater sole)
- Trinectes fonsecensis (Günther, 1862) (spotted-fin sole)
- Trinectes hubbsbollinger Duplain, Chapleau & Munroe, 2012
- Trinectes inscriptus (P. H. Gosse, 1851) (scrawled sole)
- Trinectes maculatus (Bloch & Schneider, 1801) (hogchoker)
- Trinectes microphthalmus (Chabanaud, 1928)
- Trinectes opercularis (Nichols & Murphy, 1944) (spotted-cheek sole)
- Trinectes paulistanus (A. Miranda-Ribeiro, 1915) (slipper sole)
- Trinectes xanthurus H. J. Walker & Bollinger, 2001
