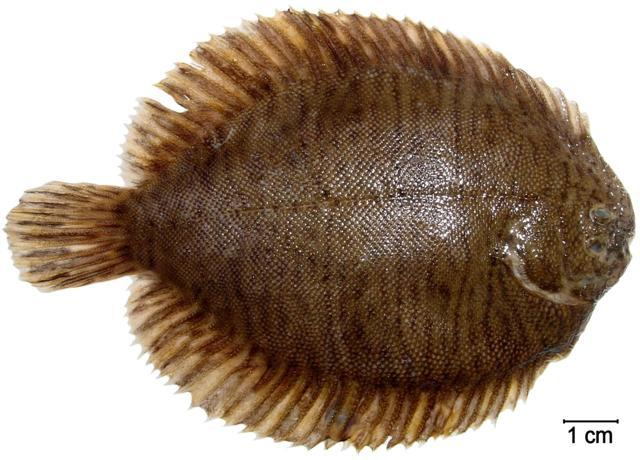
- Catathyridium.garmanii

Scientific classification
- Kingdom: Animalia
- Phylum: Chordata
- Class: Actinopterygii
- Order: Carangiformes
- Suborder: Pleuronectoidei
- Family: Achiridae
- Genus: Catathyridium; Chabanaud, 1928

Type species
- Solea jenynsii Günther 1862

= Catathyridium =

Genus of fishes

Catathyridium is a genus of mainly freshwater American soles native to South America.

== Species ==
The currently recognized species in this genus are:

- Catathyridium garmani (Jordan, 1889)
- Catathyridium grandirivi (Chabanaud, 1928)
- Catathyridium jenynsii (Günther, 1862)
- Catathyridium lorentzii (Weyenbergh (de), 1877)
