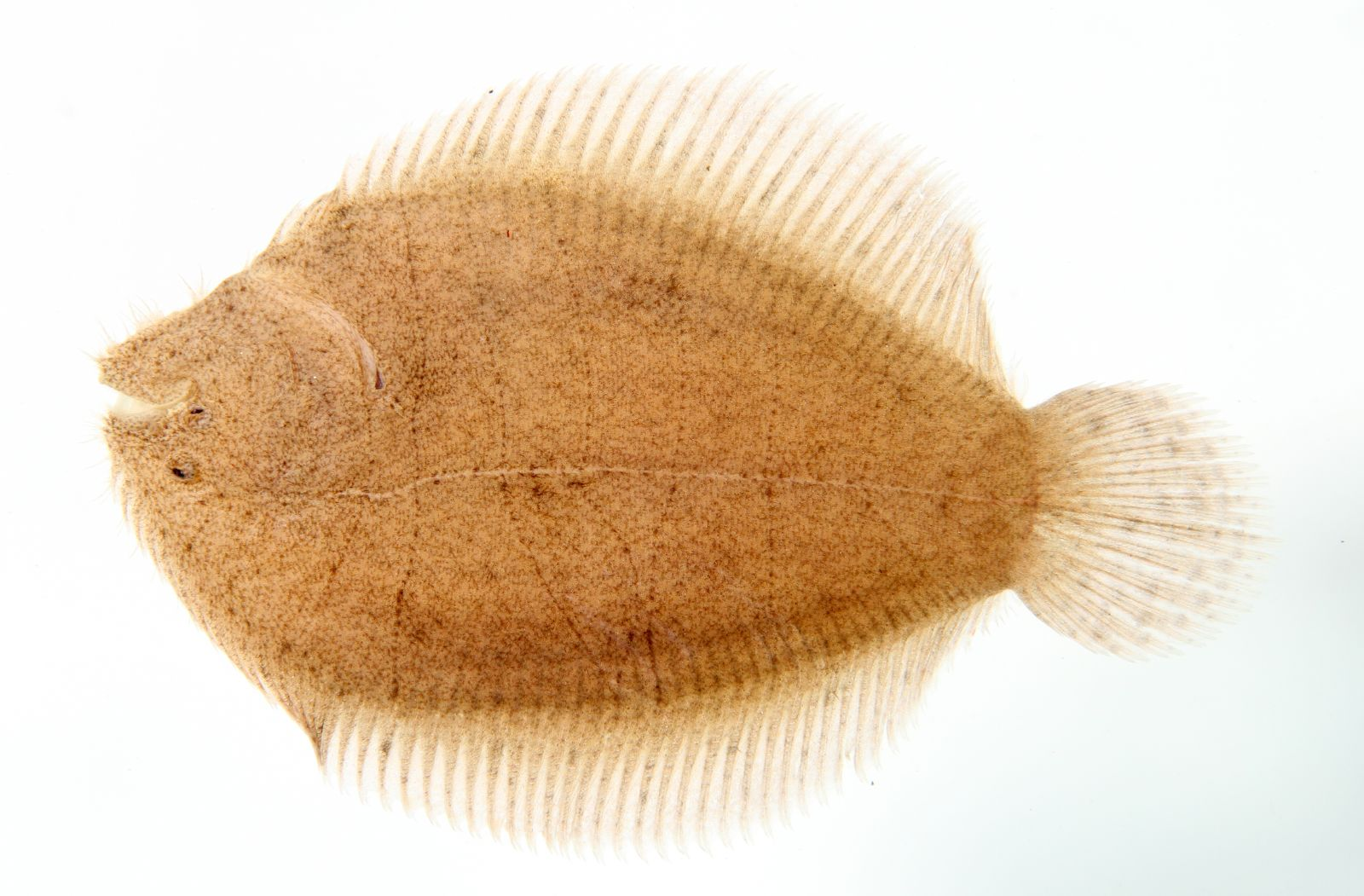

Conservation status
- Least Concern (IUCN 3.1)

Scientific classification
- Kingdom: Animalia
- Phylum: Chordata
- Class: Actinopterygii
- Order: Carangiformes
- Suborder: Pleuronectoidei
- Family: Achiridae
- Genus: Hypoclinemus; Chabanaud, 1928
- Species: H. mentalis

Binomial name
- Hypoclinemus mentalis (Günther, 1862)

Synonyms
- Solea mentalis Günther, 1862; Achirus hasemani Steindachner, 1915

= Hypoclinemus =

Genus of fishes

Hypoclinemus mentalis is a species of freshwater American sole native to the Amazon, Orinoco and Essequibo river basins in tropical South America. This species grows to a length of 21 cm (8.3 in). It is the only known species of its genus.

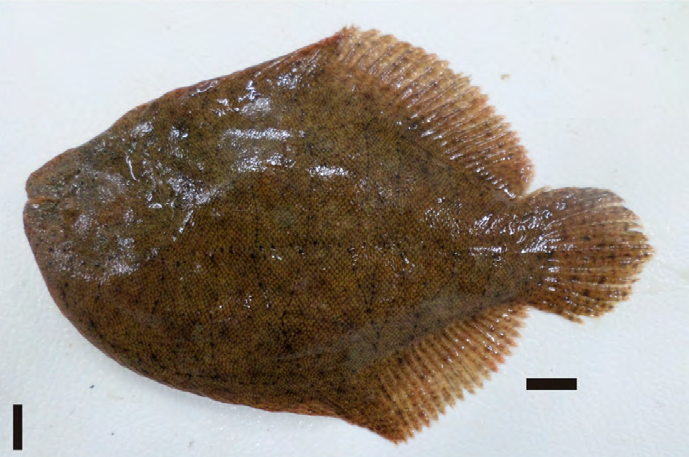
Scale bar = 1 cm
