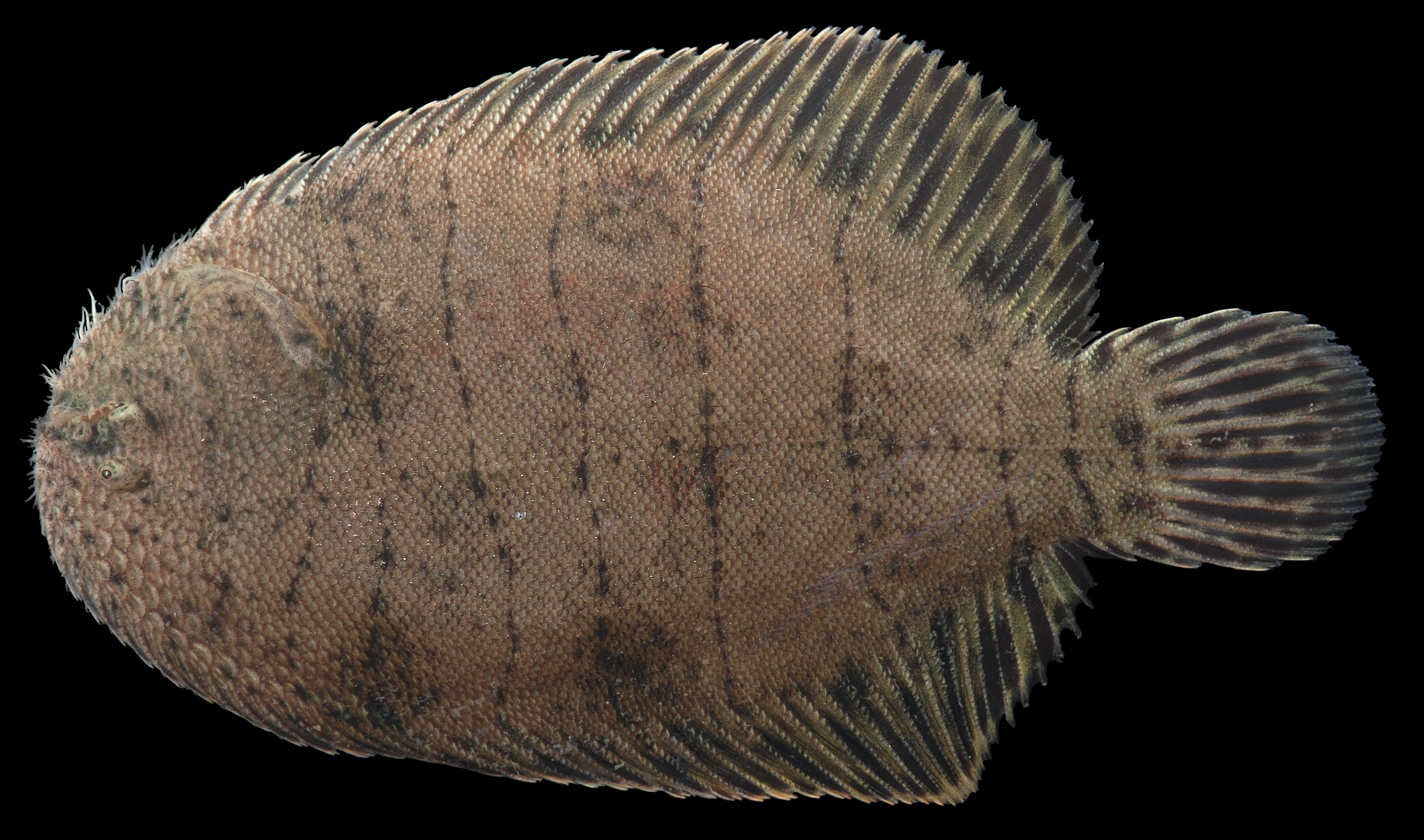

Conservation status
- Least Concern (IUCN 3.1)

Scientific classification
- Kingdom: Animalia
- Phylum: Chordata
- Class: Actinopterygii
- Division: Teleostei
- Order: Carangiformes
- Suborder: Pleuronectoidei
- Family: Achiridae
- Genus: Trinectes
- Species: T. maculatus

Binomial name
- Trinectes maculatus (Bloch & Schneider, 1801)

Synonyms
- Pleuronectes maculatus Bloch & Schneider, 1801; Achirus fasciatus Lacépède, 1802; Trinectes fasciatus (Lacepède, 1802); Pleuronectes mollis Mitchill, 1814; Trinectes scabra Rafinesque, 1832

= Hogchoker =

Species of flatfish

The hogchoker (Trinectes maculatus) is a small species of flatfish found along the Atlantic and Gulf coasts of North and South America, ranging from Massachusetts to Venezuela. They prefer brackish water, and the nominate subspecies is abundant in many bays and estuaries north of the Carolinas (the southern subspecies T. m. fasciatus replaces it south of the Carolinas). It is a member of the American sole family Achiridae. They are usually brown to dark brown in color, and lighter on their "blind side" (side lacking an eye). The overall body color is often broken by a series of spots and thin stripes, which can be lighter or darker than the main body color. The fins and tail have fringed edges helping hide the fish from its prey. They mainly feed on small aquatic insects and invertebrates. They get their common name because East Coast fishermen would feed these so-called "trash" fish to their hogs, after which the fish would bow its body into a suction cup and stick to the soft palate of the hog, rather like peanut butter in a dog's mouth.

Distinguished from other species by an interbrachial septum lacking a foramen, T. maculatus often has no rays, or rarely one ray, in its pectoral fin.

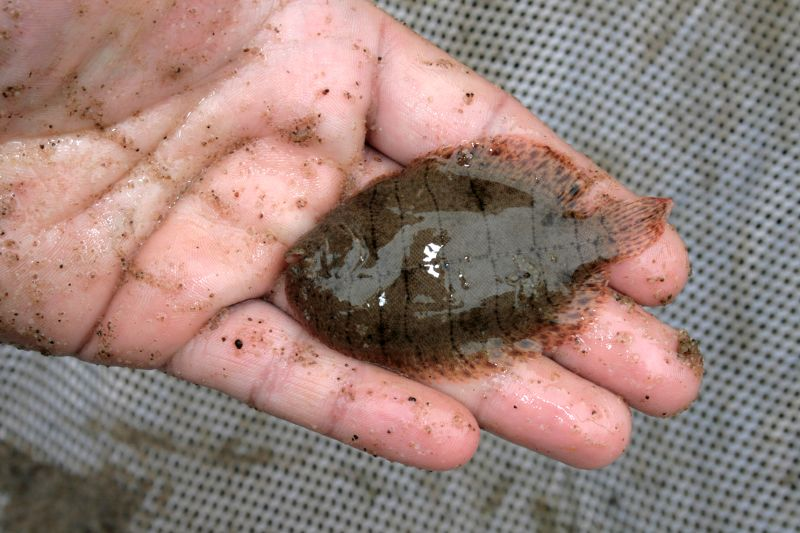
From Sabine River, Texas

== In the aquarium ==
Hogchokers are sometimes offered for sale in aquarium stores, often marketed as "freshwater flounder" or "freshwater fluke". This is not entirely accurate, however. While some species of full freshwater flatfish exist from Southeast Asia and South America, the hogchoker is thought to be a species of coastal estuaries and mud flats. While some aquarists have kept specimens for their whole lives in freshwater, it is not known whether or not they can thrive without salt. Large adult specimens have been found quite regularly up the Mississippi, Hudson, and East Rivers, so long as the bottom is soft sand and rich enough to cultivate small invertebrates on the substrate. They spend their time in aquariums attached to rocks, driftwood, and the glass, using their bellies as suction cups in much the same manner as hillstream loaches. They are known to spawn in various salinities but prefer moderate salinities of 10 to 16 parts per thousand and a temperature of around 25 °C (77 °F). After hatching the larvae move upstream into freshwater. In Spring they migrate back downstream to spawn.

They are hard to feed, preferring live food such as brine shrimp, Daphnia, mosquito larvae, and Tubifex worms. In the wild, they feed mainly by sifting tiny organisms (white sandworms in salt and brackish water, insect larvae in fresh) out of sand and mud. When unhealthy, the spots on this fish's belly often change color or move.
