= USNS Relentless =

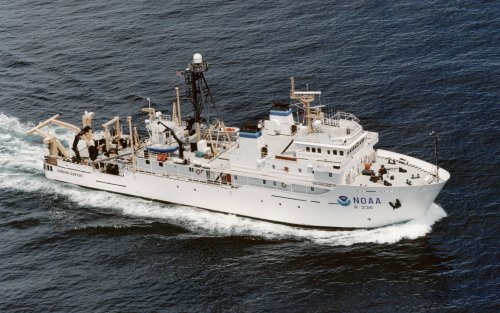
- NOAAS Gordon Gunter (R 336), ex-USNS Relentless (T-AGOS-18)

History

United States
- Name: USNS Relentless (T-AGOS-18)
- Namesake: Relentless: Unyielding in severity; unremitting, steady, and persistent
- Operator: Military Sealift Command
- Awarded: 20 February 1987
- Builder: VT Halter Marine, Inc., Moss Point, Mississippi
- Laid down: 22 April 1988
- Launched: 12 May 1989
- In service: 12 January 1990
- Out of service: 17 March 1993
- Stricken: 20 May 1993
- Fate: Transferred to National Oceanic and Atmospheric Administration 17 March 1993

United States
- Name: NOAAS Gordon Gunter (R 336)
- Namesake: Dr. Gordon Gunter (1909–1998), American marine biologist and fisheries scientist who pioneered marine research and education in the northern Gulf of Mexico
- Acquired: 17 March 1993
- Commissioned: 28 August 1998
- Home port: Pascagoula, Mississippi
- Identification: IMO number: 8835255; MMSI number: 303913000; Call sign: WTEO
- Status: Active in NOAA Atlantic Fleet

General characteristics (as U.S. Navy ocean surveillance ship)
- Class & type: Stalwart-class ocean surveillance ship
- Displacement: 1,565 tons (light) 2,535 tons (full)
- Length: 224 ft (68 m)
- Beam: 43 ft (13 m)
- Draft: 15 ft (4.6 m)
- Propulsion: Diesel-electric, two shafts, 1,600 hp (1,193 kW)
- Speed: 11 knots (20 km/h; 13 mph)
- Complement: 33 (15 U.S. Navy personnel and 18 civilians)

General characteristics (as NOAA oceanographic research ship)
- Class & type: ex-Stalwart-class fisheries research ship
- Displacement: 2,323 tons
- Length: 224 ft (68 m)
- Beam: 43 ft (13 m)
- Draft: 15 ft (4.6 m)
- Propulsion: Diesel-electric, two shafts, 1,600 hp (1,200 kW)
- Speed: 12 knots (22 km/h; 14 mph) (emergency); 10 knots (19 km/h; 12 mph) (cruising)
- Boats & landing craft carried: one 18-foot (5.5-m) RHIB
- Complement: 20 (6 NOAA Corps officers, 3 licensed engineers, and 11 other crew members), plus up to 15 scientists

USNS Relentless (T-AGOS-18) was a Stalwart-class modified tactical auxiliary general ocean surveillance ship in service in the United States Navy from 1990 to 1993. Since 1998, she has been in commission in the National Oceanic and Atmospheric Administration (NOAA) fleet as the fisheries research ship NOAAS Gordon Gunter (R 336).

== Construction ==
The U.S. Navy ordered Relentless from VT Halter Marine, on 20 February 1987. VT Halter Marine laid her down at Moss Point, Mississippi, on 22 April 1988, launched her on 12 May 1989, and delivered her to the U.S. Navy on 12 January 1990.

== United States Navy service ==
On the day of her delivery, the U.S. Navy placed the ship in non-commissioned service in the Military Sealift Command as USNS Relentless (T-AGOS-18). Like the other Stalwart-class ships, she was designed to collect underwater acoustical data in support of Cold War anti-submarine warfare operations against Soviet Navy submarines using Surveillance Towed Array Sensor System (SURTASS) sonar equipment. She operated with a mixed crew of U.S. Navy personnel and civilian merchant mariners.

After the Cold War ended with the collapse of the Soviet Union in late December 1991, the requirement for SURTASS collection declined. The Navy took Relentless out of service on 17 March 1993 and transferred her to the National Oceanic and Atmospheric Administration (NOAA) the same day. She was stricken from the Naval Vessel Register on 20 May 1993.

== National Oceanic and Atmospheric Administration service ==
NOAA converted the ship into a fisheries research ship and commissioned her into NOAA service as NOAAS Gordon Gunter (R 336) on 28 August 1998. Gordon Gunter (1909–1998), the marine biologist and fisheries scientist for whom she was named, attended her commissioning ceremony 16 weeks before his death. She replaced the decommissioned NOAA fisheries research ship NOAAS Chapman (R 446).

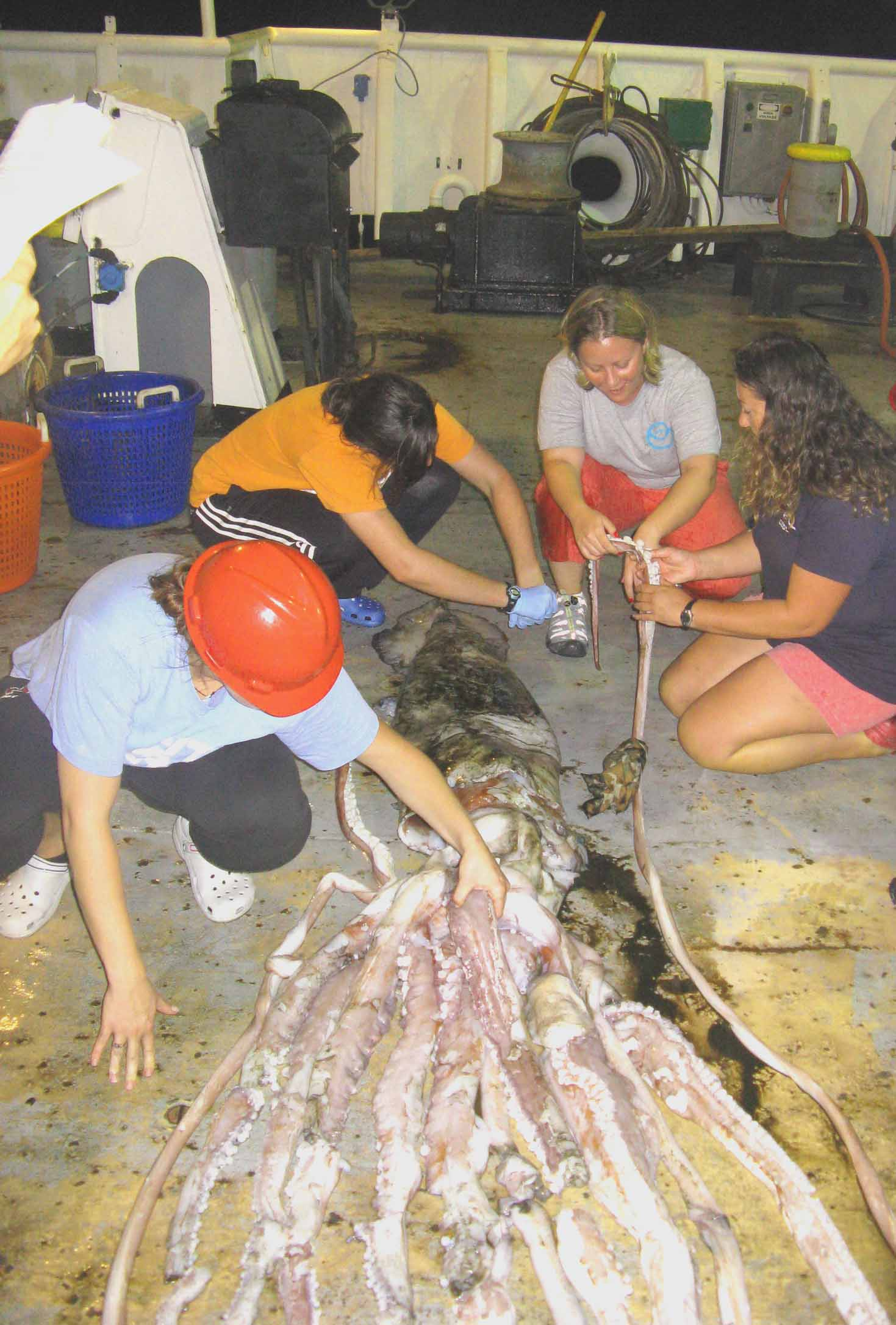
A rare giant squid trawl-netted by Gordon Gunter on 30 July 2009.

=== Capabilities ===
Gordon Gunter is outfitted for fishing operations employing stern trawling, longlining, plankton tows, dredging, and trap fishing. She is fitted with modern navigation electronics and oceanographic winches, as well as sophisticated sensors and sampling equipment which her crew and embarked scientists use to monitor the atmospheric and oceanic environment, such as a thermosalinograph, a conductivity-temperature-depth instrument (CTD), a fluorometer, and NOAA's Scientific Computer System. Gordon Gunter has a marine mammal observation and survey station located on top of her pilot house and, as an acoustically quieted research vessel, serves as an excellent platform for the study and observation of marine mammals.

Gordon Gunter has 1,229.5 square feet (sq. ft.) (114.2 square meters) (m^{2}) of mission-dedicated laboratory spaces, including a 360-sq.-ft. (33.4-m^{2}) dry laboratory, a 429-sq.-ft. (39.9-m^{2}) wet laboratory, and a 135-sq.-ft. (12.5-m^{2}) wet laboratory. On deck, two hydraulic trawl winches each have a capacity of 2,200 meters (7,200 feet) of 5/8-inch (16 mm) or 1,800 meters (5,900 feet) of 3/4-inch (19 mm) wire, an electric CTD winch with a capacity of 10,000 meters (33,000 feet) of .322" (8.2-mm) electromechanical cable, and an electric winch with a capacity of 2,000 meters (6,600 feet) of 0.322 in (8.2 mm) electromechanical cable. The ship has two 45-foot (14-meter) telescoping booms – one with a lifting capacity of 3,500 pounds (1,588 kg) at an extension of 16.3 feet (5.0 meters) and the other with a lifting capacity of 18,000 pounds (8,200 kg) – as well as a movable A-frame with a lifting capacity of 10,000 pounds (4,500 kg), and a movable J-frame with a maximum lifting capacity of 3,500 pounds (1,600 kg).

Gordon Gunter has an ice-strengthened steel hull. She normally carries one 18-foot (5.5-meter) rigid-hulled inflatable boat (RHIB) with a 90-horsepower (67-kilowatt) motor and a maximum capacity of four persons.

In addition to her crew of 20, Gordon Gunter can accommodate up to 15 scientists.

=== Service history ===
From her home port at Pascagoula, Mississippi, Gordon Gunter operates throughout the Gulf of Mexico, Atlantic Ocean, and Caribbean Sea. A multi-use platform, she primarily serves NOAA's National Marine Fisheries Service Pascagoula Laboratory in Pascagoula, Mississippi. She conducts scientific surveys of the health and abundance of adult and larval commercial and recreational fish, the health and distribution of marine mammals, oceanographic studies, and habitat investigations.

Gordon Gunter's first international project, the Windwards Humpback Cruise, took place in the Caribbean Sea. The primary objective of the cruise was to obtain scientific information on humpback whales that was used in a comprehensive assessment by the International Whaling Commission in June 2001, and to support U.S. management requirements for these endangered whales under the Marine Mammal Protection Act of 1972. Scientists aboard Gordon Gunter used both visual and acoustic techniques to locate humpback whales and other marine mammal species and located many whales by tracking their songs with sonar buoys.

Gordon Gunter supported the Sustainable Seas Expeditions – a five-year project of NOAA, the National Marine Sanctuaries Program and the National Geographic Society carried out between 1998 and 2002 – at several United States national marine sanctuaries. The project featured underwater exploration of the sanctuaries with crewed submersible units.

Gordon Gunter has demonstrated mission flexibility through her ability to undergo quick reconfiguration. On one occasion, her after working deck was reconfigured to deploy a weather buoy about 160 nautical miles (295 km; 185 mi) off the Louisiana coast. This mission helped fill a critical data gap in weather information that commercial fishermen, the petroleum industry, and recreational boaters rely upon heavily.
