= Pnictes =

Scientific classification
- Kingdom: Animalia
- Phylum: Chordata
- Class: Actinopterygii
- Division: Teleostei
- Order: Carangiformes
- Suborder: Pleuronectoidei
- Family: Achiridae
- Genus: Pnictes; Jordan, 1919
- Species: P. asphyxiatus

Binomial name
- Pnictes asphyxiatus (D. S. Jordan, 1889)

Synonyms
- Achiropsis asphyxiatus Jordan, 1889; Apionichthys asphyxiatus (Jordan, 1889)

Species of fish

Pnictes asphyxiatus is a species of freshwater American sole known only from the Amazon Basin in Brazil. This species grows to a standard length of 9.6 cm (3.8 in). It is so far known from only one specimen. This species is the only known member of its genus, Pnictes.
