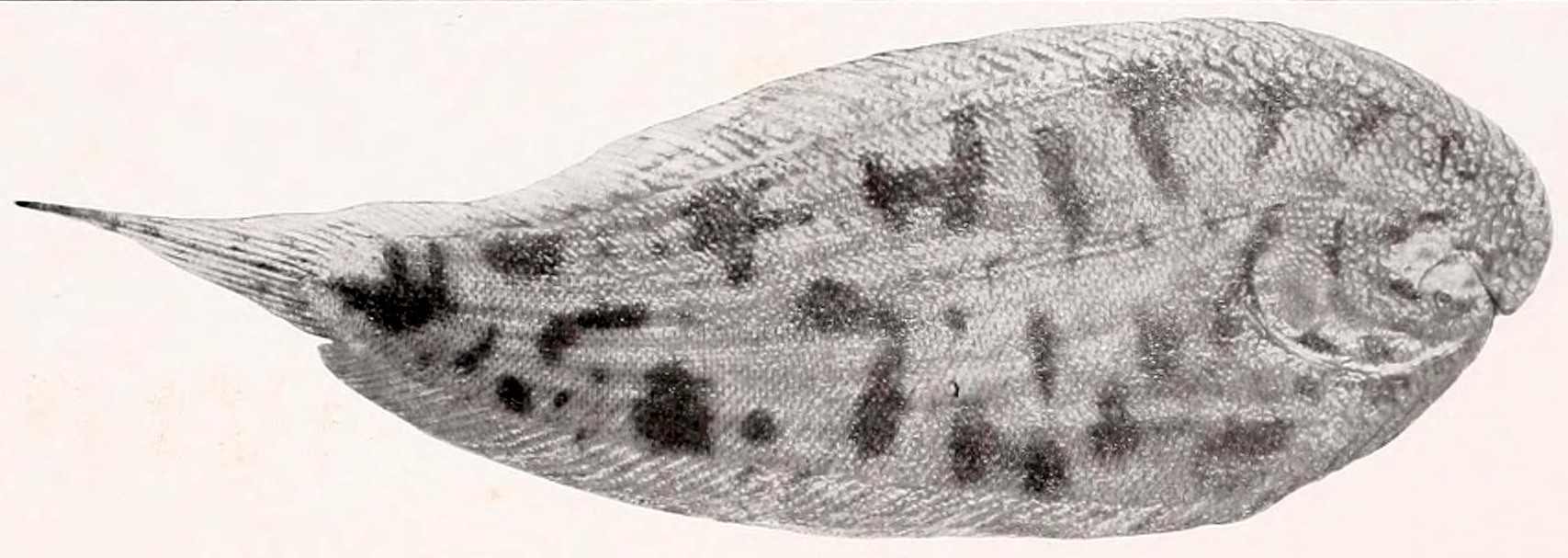

Scientific classification
- Kingdom: Animalia
- Phylum: Chordata
- Class: Actinopterygii
- Order: Carangiformes
- Suborder: Pleuronectoidei
- Family: Achiridae
- Genus: Apionichthys; Kaup, 1858

Type species
- Apionichthys dumerili Kaup, 1858

Synonyms
- Achiropsis Steindachner 1876; Soleotalpa Günther, 1862

= Apionichthys =

Genus of fishes

Apionichthys is a genus of mostly freshwater American soles native to South America.

== Species ==
The currently recognized species in this genus are:

- Apionichthys dumerili Kaup, 1858 (longtail sole)
- Apionichthys finis (C. H. Eigenmann, 1912)
- Apionichthys menezesi R. T. C. Ramos, 2003
- Apionichthys nattereri (Steindachner, 1876)
- Apionichthys rosai R. T. C. Ramos, 2003
- Apionichthys sauli R. T. C. Ramos, 2003
- Apionichthys seripierriae R. T. C. Ramos, 2003
