= Gordon Gunter =

American marine biologist and fisheries scientist (1909–1998)

- Born: Gordon Pennington Gunter; August 18, 1909; Goldonna, Louisiana
- Died: December 19, 1998 (aged 89); Ocean Springs, Mississippi
- Education: Bachelor of Arts in Zoology, Louisiana State Normal College 1929; Master of Arts, University of Texas 1931; PhD, University of Texas 1945
- Known for: Study of fisheries in northern Gulf of Mexico
- Spouses: Carlotta Gertrude Gunter nee La Cour (m. 1932); Frances Gunter née Hudgins (m. 1955)
- Scientific career
- Fields: Marine biology, Fisheries science
- Institutions: United States Bureau of Fisheries & Scripps Institution of Oceanography 1932–1939; Texas Fish, Game and Oyster Commission 1939–1949; University of Texas 1939–1955; University of Texas Institute of Marine Science 1949–1955; University of Southern Mississippi Gulf Coast Research Laboratory 1955–1979

Gordon Pennington Gunter (August 18, 1909 – December 19, 1998) was an American marine biologist and fisheries scientist. He is noted for his pioneering study of fisheries in the northern Gulf of Mexico, a topic to which he devoted his entire professional life over a career spanning 60 years. His own research, and that of the scientists under his direction, established an understanding of the ecology, comparative physiology of the plant and animal life, and commercial fisheries of the region, and he coined the phrase "fertile fisheries crescent" to refer to Mississippi Sound and adjacent waters along the United States Gulf Coast. He also pioneered the study of the comparative physiology of shellfish and fish.

== Early life ==
Gordon Pennington Gunter was born in Goldonna, Louisiana, on August 18, 1909. Arriving at Louisiana State Normal College in Natchitoches, Louisiana, with plans to study to become a lawyer or a French scholar, he instead took a strong interest in biology as soon as he took his first college course in the subject, and he graduated in 1929 with a Bachelor of Arts in Zoology. He then attended the University of Texas in Austin, Texas, to study bacteriology and received a master's degree in 1931.

== Career ==
=== Early career ===
After graduation, Gunter became a researcher for the United States Bureau of Fisheries, studying shrimp and oysters in Louisiana and Florida. He also studied ichthyology at the Scripps Institution of Oceanography in La Jolla, California, and participated in the U.S. Engineers Office′s Debris Dam Fisheries Survey.

=== University of Texas ===
In 1939, Gunter returned to the University of Texas as an instructor in physiology, concurrently taking a position as a marine biologist with the Texas Fish, Game and Oyster Commission. He received a Ph.D. in physiology and zoology from the University of Texas in 1945.

The University of Texas founded the Institute of Marine Science at Port Aransas, Texas, in 1945, and Gunter began research there after receiving his Ph.D. He served as acting director of the institute from 1949 to 1954 and as its director from 1954 to 1955. He also was the editor of the University of Texas's Publications of the Institute of Marine Science from 1950 to 1955 and founded the publication Contributions to Marine Science.

=== Gulf Coast Research Laboratory ===
In 1955, Gunter left Texas to become director of the University of Southern Mississippi′s Gulf Coast Research Laboratory in Ocean Springs, Mississippi, a position he assumed on September 1, 1955. At the time, the laboratory was merely a part-time summer school teaching facility with one full-time scientist (a marine biologist) and two part-time support personnel making up its entire paid staff and a physical plant that was so limited that students often worked and studied outdoors. Gunter had a vision of the laboratory becoming a major research center for the study of marine biology and fisheries in the Gulf of Mexico; he set about fulfilling that vision, and he is best known for his tenure at the laboratory. During its 16 years with Gunter as its director, the laboratory experienced tremendous growth in the size of its scientific staff, its educational efforts, and its physical plant. The laboratory's first project under Gunter's direction funded by the United States Fish and Wildlife Service was a study of the life cycle of the menhaden published in 1958, and much of the significant early fisheries research in the northern Gulf of Mexico took place under his direct supervision as director.

Gunter was an avid and voracious reader and believed strongly in keeping up to date on current professional literature, and on September 1, 1955, as one of his first initiatives as director, he established a research library at the laboratory for use by faculty, staff, visiting scientists, and students. The library began as a collection of books and reprints in Gunter's office, and he built its collection almost singlehandedly, purchasing and donating to it many of the early volumes in its collection. In April 1961 he established the publication Gulf Research Reports – renamed Gulf and Caribbean Research in 2002 – which he described as "...devoted primarily to publication of the data of the Marine Sciences, chiefly of the Gulf of Mexico and adjacent waters." He also used Gulf Research Reports as a means of further building the laboratory's library, trading issues of the publication for scientific journals to add to the library's collection, and the library became arguably the premier marine library on the U.S. Gulf Coast. In 1963, a full-time professional staff began working at the library, by 1971 it took up a third of the ground floor of one of the laboratory's buildings, and by May 2010 its collection exceeded 27,000 volumes.

After he arrived in 1955, Gunter oversaw a construction program to give the laboratory far more extensive and modern facilities. His tenure saw the construction of the laboratory's oceanography building, a 40-room brick dormitory, the anadromous fisheries building (destroyed by Hurricane Katrina in 2005), the research building, the Caylor Building, and a maintenance shop, as well as the rebuilding of the Hopkins teaching laboratory (destroyed by Hurricane Camille in 1969). The 65-foot (20-meter) research vessel Gulf Researcher also was constructed for the laboratory while he was the director. Gunter also pursued other goals to build a significant research program at the laboratory, including the recruitment of high-quality personnel, developing a network of affiliated colleges and universities to enhance the summer field program by bringing in students from other universities and other states, the founding of a museum, and championing the laboratory and its work to state university presidents and the members of the Board of Trustees of the Institutes of Higher Learning of the State of Mississippi, the Mississippi Legislature, and the Mississippi Academy of Sciences.

Gunter was an early advocate of aquaculture, and he foresaw an industry involving the mariculture of shrimp eventually growing along the U.S. Gulf Coast. In 1968, although no advanced technology for the farming of shrimp yet existed, Gunter created and led one of the first research teams – a handpicked staff of physiologists – to look into the development of artificial shrimp feed for use in raising shrimp in commercial aquaculture. His pioneering work helped lead to a burgeoning shrimp-farming industry along the U.S. Gulf Coast by the mid-1980s.

In addition to furthering the interests of the laboratory, Gunter found time to conduct his research. Investigating oyster mortality in the Gulf of Mexico, Gunter conducted research that aided in identifying the parasitic protist Dermocystidium marinum, later renamed Perkinsus marinus, the pathogen causing the disease perkinsosis, also known as dermo, in oysters.

Gunter saw an understanding of the effects of the Mississippi River on the biology of fisheries in the north-central Gulf of Mexico as essential to understanding and managing fisheries resources in the area, and he supported the idea of a large, 20-to-25-year effort by a multidisciplinary team of scientists to discover and assess the river's impact. As the sole expert consultant to the United States Army Corps of Engineers in Mississippi for several years, he researched the paleogeography of the Mississippi River and projected the course of the river if the Corps of Engineers did not engage in flood control and other efforts designed to modify the river's behavior. He concluded that without the work of the Corps of Engineers, the Atchafalaya River increasingly would capture the waters of the Mississippi, that the two rivers would be of equal size by 2038, and that the Mississippi eventually would cease to flow past New Orleans, and instead would turn westward to flow down to the Gulf of Mexico down the course of the Atchafalaya, entering the Gulf of Mexico near Morgan City, Louisiana. Colleagues credited Gunter with being instrumental in urging the Corps of Engineers to require environmental impact statements.

Gunter also saw the laboratory through Hurricane Camille, which struck during the night of August 17–18, 1969, flooding its grounds with a storm surge that reached a depth of 18.5 feet (5.6 meters). Although its research vessels rode out the storm safely, the laboratory suffered the destruction of about half of its buildings – three of brick construction and four wooden ones – and severe damage to its wooden dining hall. Gunter told the students at the laboratory to go home the day after the storm because of the destruction of the facilities necessary to accommodate them, which he described as "one if the sadder duties of my life."

Gunter stepped down as director of the Gulf Coast Research Laboratory in 1971, but he continued to work at the laboratory as professor of zoology and director emeritus until 1979 when he retired from active service to the state government of Mississippi at the age of 70. By the time of his retirement, the laboratory had grown tremendously from what it had been when he arrived in 1955, becoming a major marine research center. In 1971, it had a staff of 100 employees, technicians, and support personnel, including over 20 scientists and other professionals divided into 13 sections (botany, chemistry, data processing, ecological physiology, fisheries management, fisheries research and development, geology, library, microbiology, museum, noxious animals, parasitology, and public information), each with technical staff, aides, and a few supervised graduate students, as well as custodial workers, tradesmen, and groundskeepers to clean and maintain the building and grounds. Its summer field program had grown from an enrollment of 40 students in 1955 to 80 in 1971, and the laboratory's annual budget had increased from $25,000 in 1955 to about $1,000,000 – supplemented by about $500,000 per year in grants and contracts – in 1971, by which time it had become one of the best-known and most respected marine research laboratories on the U.S. Gulf Coast.

== Publications ==
Gunter wrote over 330 scientific papers and scholarly and popular articles, covering every aspect of U.S. Gulf Coast fisheries, and his writings on the relationships of salinity and temperature to marine life in the northern Gulf of Mexico became standard college marine biology texts. In addition to his writings on fisheries, he wrote articles on a variety of other topics, such as the abilities and behaviors of shore birds, insects, and primroses. He became known among animal rights groups for an article he wrote for the journal Science in 1961 entitled "Painless Killing of Crabs and Other Large Crustaceans" in which he called the boiling of live lobsters "unnecessary torture."

Some of his more important papers were:

- "Notes on invasion of fresh water by fishes of the Gulf of Mexico, with special reference to the Mississippi- Atchafalaya river system." Copeia 1938(2):69-72. (1938)
- "Seasonal variations in abundance of certain estuarine and marine fishes in Louisiana, with particular reference to life histories." Ecological Monographs 8:3 13-346. (1938)
- "Relative numbers of shallow water fishes of the northern Gulf of Mexico, with some records of rare fishes from the Texas coast." The American Midland Naturalist 26: 194- 200.(1941)
- "Studies of marine fishes of Texas." Publications of the Institute of Marine Science, University of Texas 1:l-190. (1945)
- "Seasonal population changes and distributions as related to salinity, of certain invertebrates of the Texas coast, including the commercial shrimp." Publications of the Institute of Marine Science, University of Texas 1:7-5 1. (1950)
- "Correlation between the temperature of water and size of marine fishes on the Atlantic and Gulf coasts of the United States." Copeia 1950(4):298-304. (1950)
- "Historical changes in the Mississippi River and the adjacent marine environment". Publications of the Institute of Marine Science, University of Texas 2: 119–139. (1952)
- "Predominance of the young among fishes found in fresh water." Copeia 1957(1):13-16. (1957)
- "Salinity." Chapter 7. In: "Treatise on Marine Ecology and Paleoecology." Vol. 1 Ecology. Memoir 67, Geological Society of America. p. 129-1 57. (A.S. Pearse and Gunter). (1957)
- "Temperature." Chapter 8. In: "Treatise on Marine Ecology and Paleoecology." Vol. 1 Ecology. Memoir 67, Geological Society of America. p. 159-18 4. (1957)
- "Some relations of estuarine organisms to salinity." Limnology and Oceanography 6: 182–190. (1961)
- "Salinity and size in marine fishes." Copeia 1961(2):234- 235. (1961)
- "Biological investigations of the St. Lucie Estuary (Florida) in connection with Lake Okeechobee discharges through the St. Lucie Canal." Gulf Research Reports, 1:189-307. (Gunter and G.E. Hall). (1963)
- "Some relations of salinity to population distributions of motile estuarine organisms, with special reference to penaeid shrimp." Ecology 45:181-185. (with J. Y. Christmas and R. Killebrew). (1964)
- "A biological investigation of the Caloosahatchee Estuary of Florida". Gulf Research Reports 2: 1-71. (1965)
- "Some relationships of estuaries to the fisheries of the Gulf of Mexico. Part IX Fisheries." In: G. H. Lauff, ed., Estuaries, Publication No. 83. American Association for the Advancement of Science, Washington, D.C. p. 621-638. (1967)
- "A review of salinity problems of organisms in United States coastal areas subject to the effects of engineering works." Gulf Research Reports 4:3 (1974)

== Professional associations and awards ==
Gunter belonged to the American Fisheries Society for 50 years, and received its highest honor when he was named an Honorary Member of the Society. An active member of the National Shellfisheries Association, he became its first paid Life Member in 1959, and in 1973 he received its highest honor when he was named an Honored Life Member. He was a member of the Mississippi Academy of Sciences and was elected its president in 1966; it presented him with its prestigious Outstanding Contributions to Science in Mississippi award in 1975. A charter member of the World Mariculture Society, later renamed the World Aquaculture Society, he hosted its first meeting in 1969, and he served as its president from 1973 to 1974.

== Personal life ==
Gunter married the former Carlotta "Lottie" Gertrude La Cour in 1932, with whom he had a daughter and two sons. In 1955, he married the former Frances Hudgins, with whom he had two sons.

An American Civil War (1861–1865) enthusiast who sympathized strongly with the Southern cause, Gunter wrote in 1969 that he found comfort and inspiration in the sight of the Confederate battle flag flying over the Gulf Coast Research Laboratory grounds after the destruction wrought by Hurricane Camille that year. He was an active member of the Sons of Confederate Veterans and the Military Order of the Stars and Bars. He also was an active member of the Sons of the American Revolution.

== Death ==
Gunter died on December 19, 1998, in Ocean Springs. His career in marine biology and fisheries science had lasted more than 60 years.

== Commemoration ==
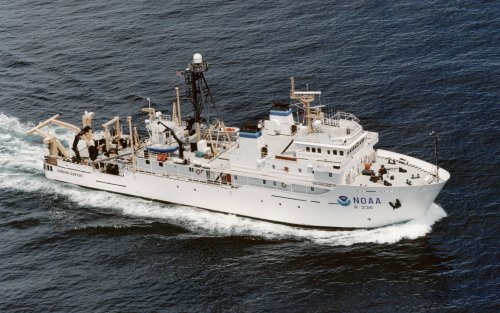
NOAAS Gordon Gunter (R 336)

On December 21, 1972, the Board of Trustees of the Institutes of Higher Learning of the State of Mississippi named the library Gunter established and expanded at the Gulf Coast Research Library the Gunter Library in his honor.

The National Shellfish Association created its Gordon Gunter Poster Award in Gunter's honor.

Thomas D. McIlwain, a student of Gunter's who served as director of the Gulf Coast Research Laboratory from 1989 to 1994 and then became an administrator at the National Marine Fisheries Service, an element of the National Oceanic and Atmospheric Administration (NOAA), led an effort to honor Gunter's fisheries work in the Gulf of Mexico by having a ship of the NOAA fleet named after him, saying of Gunter, "He was one of the pioneers." McIlwain's efforts paid off when the NOAA research ship NOAAS Gordon Gunter (R 336) was named in honor of Gunter. Gunter attended the ship's commissioning ceremony on August 28, 1998, only 16 weeks before his death.
