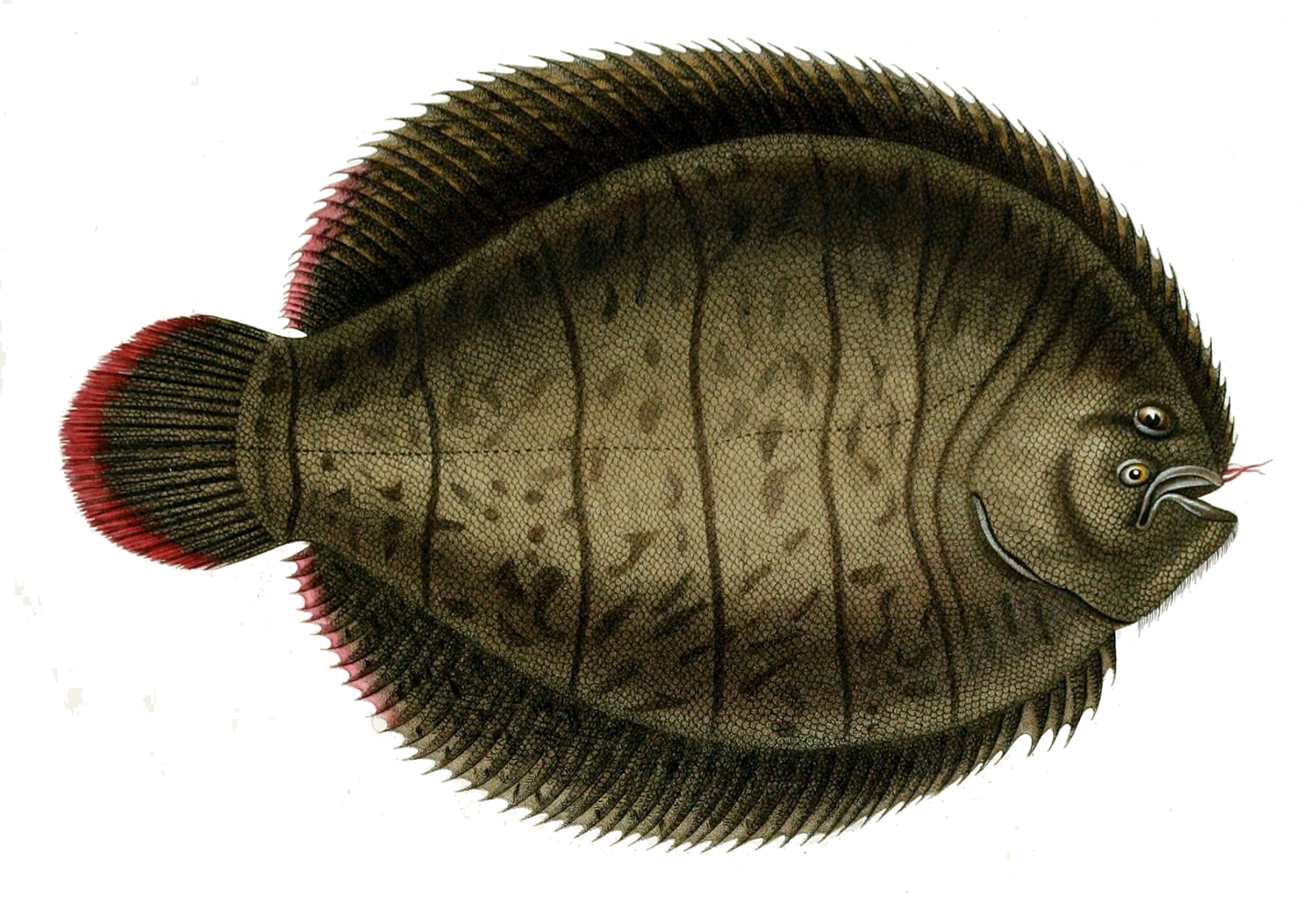
- Achirus lineatus

Scientific classification
- Kingdom: Animalia
- Phylum: Chordata
- Class: Actinopterygii
- Order: Carangiformes
- Suborder: Pleuronectoidei
- Family: Achiridae
- Genus: Achirus; Lacépède, 1802

Type species
- Pleuronectes achirus Linnaeus, 1758

Synonyms
- Anathyridium Chabanaud, 1928; Baiostoma Bean, 1882; Grammichthys Kaup. 1858

= Achirus =

Genus of fishes

Achirus is a genus of American soles native to tropical and subtropical parts of the Americas. They are mainly found in coastal areas, including salt and brackish water, but some species are found in fresh water.

== Species ==
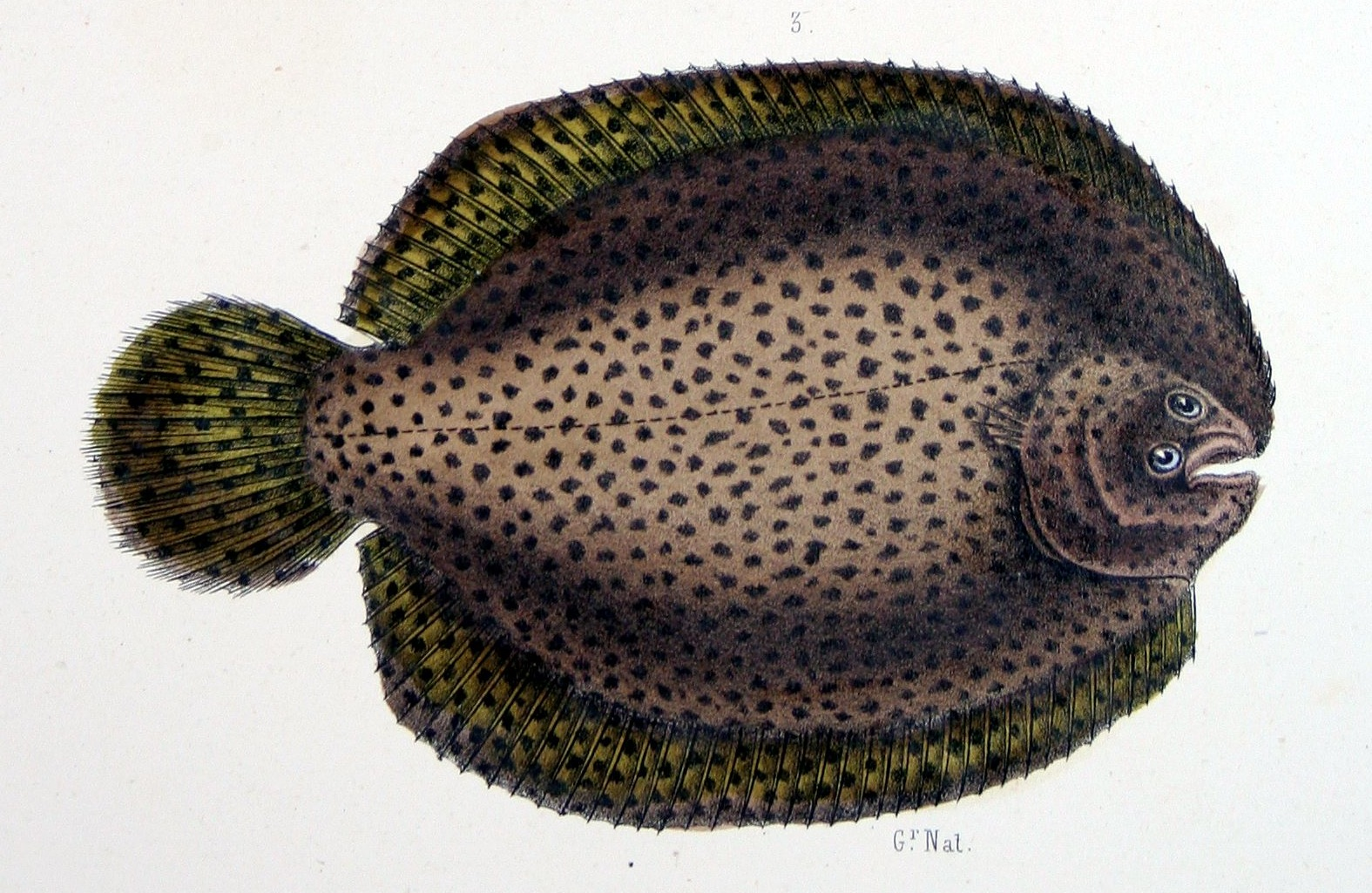
Achirus achirus

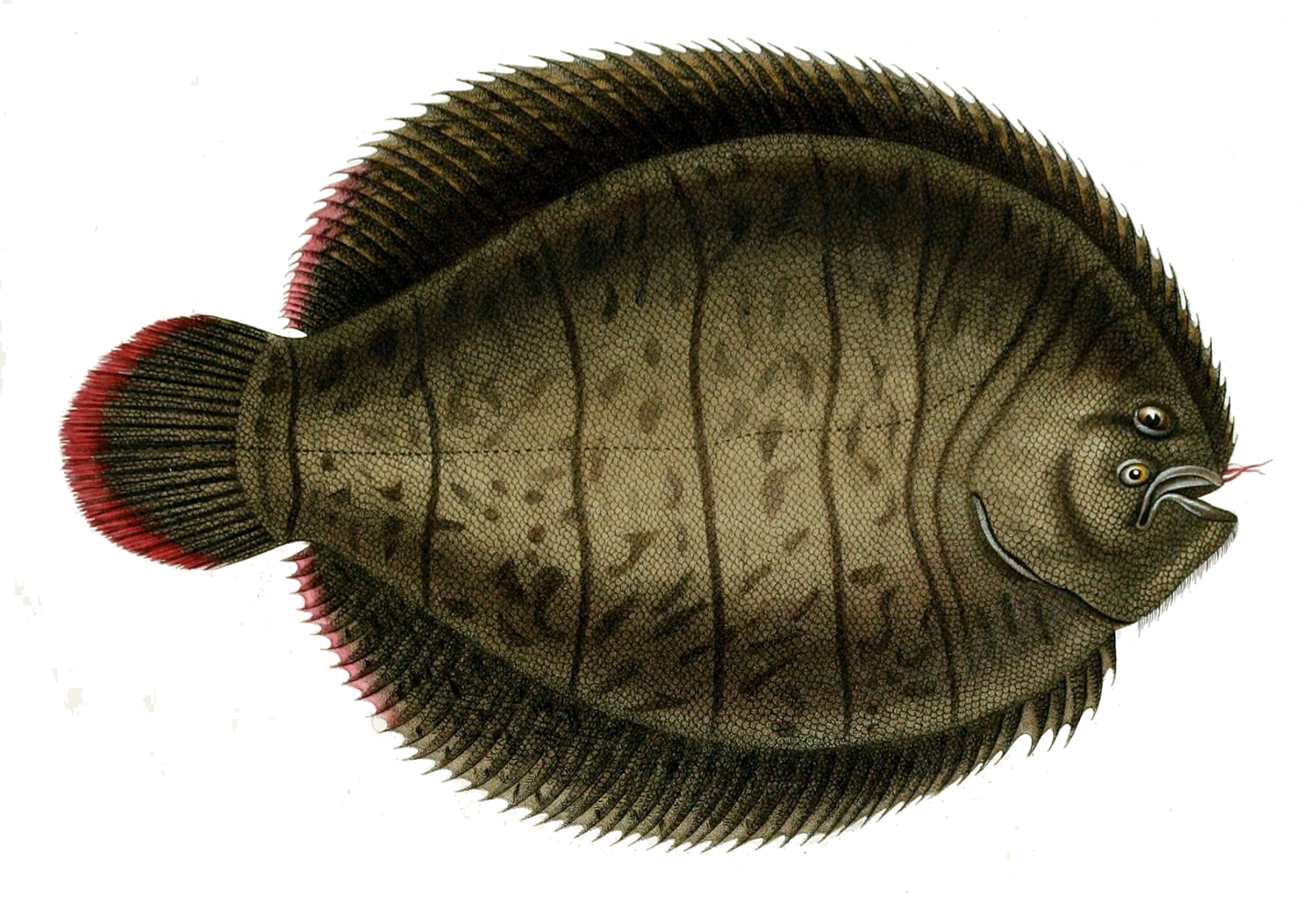
Achirus linetus

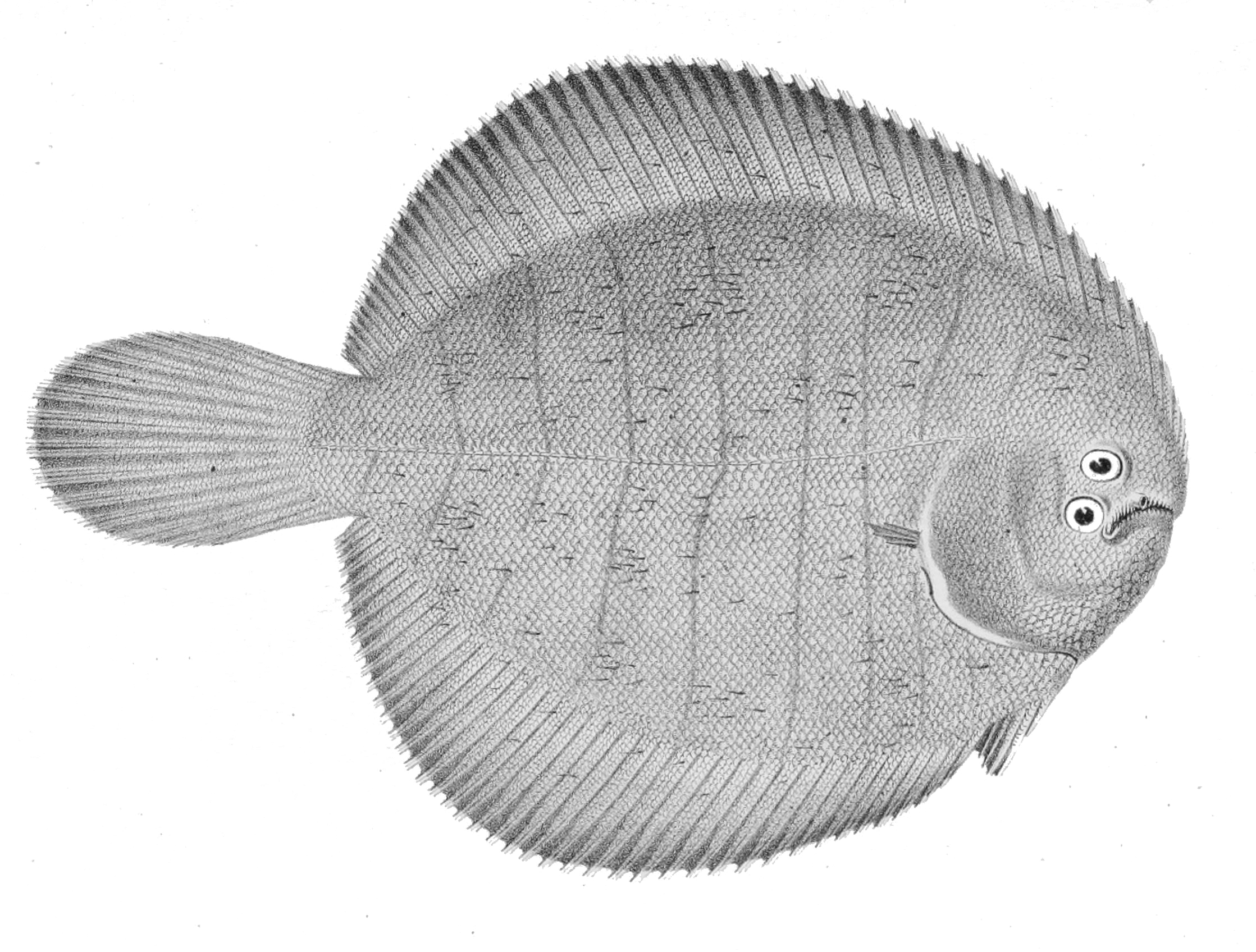
Achirus mazatlanus

The currently recognized species in this genus are:

- Achirus achirus (Linnaeus, 1758) (drab sole)
- Achirus declivis Chabanaud, 1940 (plainfin sole)
- Achirus klunzingeri (Steindachner, 1880) (brown sole)
- Achirus lineatus (Linnaeus, 1758) (lined sole)
- Achirus mazatlanus (Steindachner, 1869) (Mazatlan sole)
- Achirus mucuri R. T. C. Ramos, T. P. A. Ramos & P. R. D. Lopes, 2009 (American sole)
- Achirus novoae Cervigón, 1982
- Achirus scutum (Günther, 1862) (network sole)
- Achirus zebrinus H. W. Clark, 1936
