= Sole (fish) =

Fish name belonging to several families

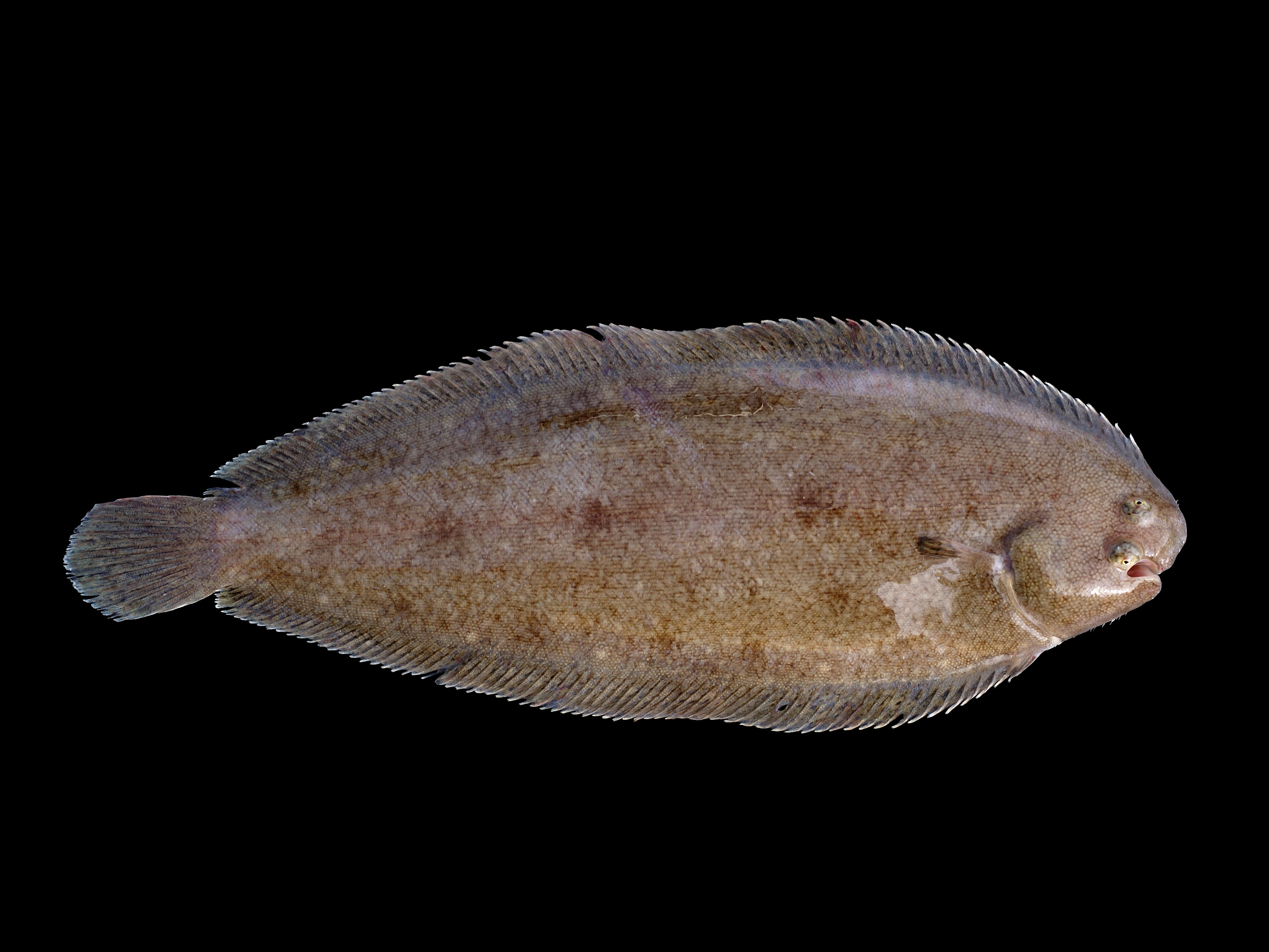
The common sole (or Dover sole) is a species of marine flatfish widely found around the coasts of Europe

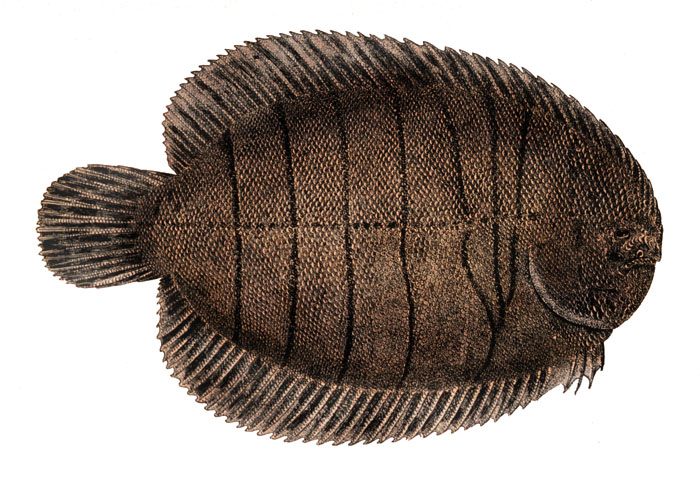
The American soles are a family of flatfish found in both freshwater and marine environments of the Americas

A sole is a fish belonging to several families in the suborder Pleuronectoidei. Generally speaking, they are members of the family Soleidae, but, outside Europe, the name sole is also applied to various other similar flatfish, especially other members of the sole suborder Soleoidei as well as members of the flounder family. In European cookery, there are several species which may be considered true soles, but the common or Dover sole Solea solea, often simply called the sole, is the most esteemed and most widely available.

== Etymology of the word ==
The word sole in English, French, and Italian comes from its resemblance to a sandal, Latin solea. In other languages, it is named for the tongue, e.g. Greek glóssa (γλώσσα), German Seezunge, Dutch zeetong or tong or the smaller and popular sliptong (young sole), Hungarian nyelvhal, Spanish lenguado, Cantonese lung lei (龍脷, 'dragon tongue'), Arabic lisan Ath-thawr (لسان الثور) (for the common sole) meaning 'the tongue of ox' in Qosbawi accent, Turkish dil.

A partial list of common names for species referred to as sole include:

- In the sole suborder Soleoidei:
  - The true soles, Soleidae, including the common or Dover sole, Solea solea. These are the only fishes called soles in Europe.
  - The American soles, Achiridae, sometimes classified among the Soleidae.
  - The tonguefishes or tongue soles, Cynoglossidae, whose common names usually include the word 'tongue'.
- Several species of righteye flounder in the family Pleuronectidae, including the lemon sole, the Pacific Dover sole, and the petrale sole.

== Threats ==
The true sole, Solea solea, is sufficiently distributed that it is not considered a threatened species; however, overfishing in Europe has produced severely diminished populations, with declining catches in many regions. For example, the western English Channel and Irish Sea sole fisheries face potential collapse according to data in the UK Biodiversity Action Plan.

Sole, along with the other major bottom-feeding fish in the North Sea such as cod, monkfish, and plaice, is listed by the ICES as "outside safe biological limits." Moreover, they are growing less quickly now and are rarely older than six years, although they can reach forty. World stocks of large predatory fish and large ground fish such as sole and flounder were estimated in 2003 to be only about 10% of pre-industrial levels. According to the World Wildlife Fund in 2006, "of the nine sole stocks, seven are overfished with the status of the remaining two unknown."

In 2010, Greenpeace International has added the common sole to its seafood red list, as they are primarily caught by beam trawlers, which have a very high bycatch rate. The Greenpeace International seafood red list is a list of fish that are commonly sold in supermarkets around the world, and which have a very high risk of being sourced from unsustainable fisheries.
