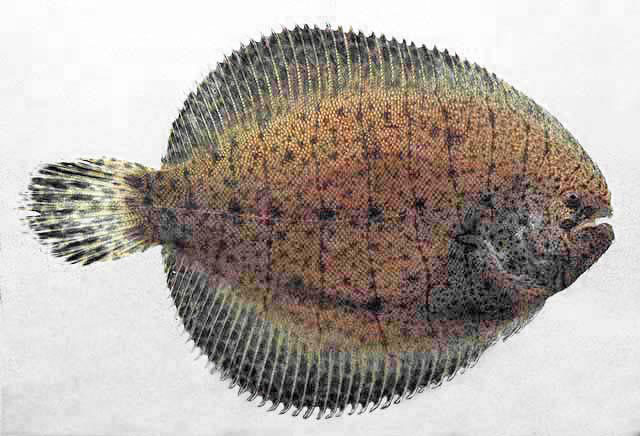
- Achirus lineatus

Scientific classification
- Kingdom: Animalia
- Phylum: Chordata
- Class: Actinopterygii
- Order: Carangiformes
- Suborder: Pleuronectoidei
- Family: Achiridae; Rafinesque, 1810

Type genus
- Achirus Lacépède, 1802

Genera
- Achirus; Apionichthys; Catathyridium; Gymnachirus; Hypoclinemus; Pnictes; Trinectes

= American sole =

American soles

Family of fishes

The American soles are a family (Achiridae) of flatfish occurring in both freshwater and marine environments of the Americas. The family includes about 35 species in seven genera. These are closely related to the soles (Soleidae), and have been classified as a subfamily of it, but achirids have a number of distinct characteristics.

Eyes are on the right side, and the eyed-side lower lip has a distinctive fleshy rim. The dorsal and anal fins are usually separate from the caudal fin. The pectoral fins are small or nonexistent. They are fairly small; only Achirus achirus is known to surpass 30 cm (1 ft) in length.

== See also ==
- List of fish common names
- List of fish families
