= List of hammerhead sharks =

This is a list of hammerhead sharks.

== Sphyrna ==
Name	Binomial Name	Status	Distribution
Bonnethead	Sphyrna tiburo	LR/lc	Northern South American coast, Gulf of Mexico, Southern California coast
Great hammerhead	Sphyrna mokarran	EN	Tropical and subtropical coasts
Scalloped bonnethead	Sphyrna corona	NT	California and Northwest South American coasts
Scalloped hammerhead	Sphyrna lewini	EN	Tropical and subtropical coasts worldwide
Carolina hammerhead	Sphyrna gilberti	?	western Atlantic Ocean
Scoophead	Sphyrna media	DD	California and northern South American coast
Smalleye hammerhead	Sphyrna tudes	VU	eastern South American coast
Smooth hammerhead	Sphyrna zygaena	VU	worldwide subtropical coasts, southern South America, Australia and New Zealand coast
Whitefin hammerhead	Sphyrna couardi	DD	western Spain coast, west African coast

== Eusphyra ==
Name	Binomial_Name	Status	Distribution
Winghead shark	Eusphyra blochii	LC/nt	Southeast Asian coasts
