= Zygaena (disambiguation) =

Zygaena is a genus of moths in the family Zygaenidae.

Zygaena may also refer to:

- Sphyrna zygaena, the smooth hammerhead shark
- Zygaena dissimilis and Zygaena mokarran, synonyms of the great hammerhead shark, Sphyrna mokarran
- Zygaena blochii, Zygaena laticeps, Zygaena latycephala, synonyms of the winghead shark, Eusphyra blochii
- Zygaena lewini, Zygaena erythraea, obsolete names for the scalloped hammerhead shark, Sphyrna lewini
- Zygocranchia zygaena, a synonym for Galiteuthis armata, the armed cranch squid
