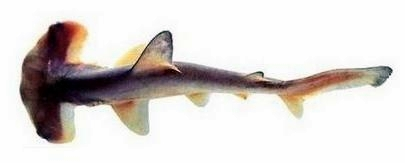

Conservation status
- Critically Endangered (IUCN 3.1)
- CITES Appendix II

Scientific classification
- Kingdom: Animalia
- Phylum: Chordata
- Class: Chondrichthyes
- Subclass: Elasmobranchii
- Division: Selachii
- Order: Carcharhiniformes
- Family: Sphyrnidae
- Genus: Sphyrna
- Species: S. tudes

Binomial name
- Sphyrna tudes (Valenciennes, 1822)
- Range of the smalleye hammerhead

Synonyms
- Sphyrna bigelowi S. Springer, 1944

= Smalleye hammerhead =

Species of fish

The smalleye hammerhead (Sphyrna tudes), also called the golden hammerhead or curry shark, is a small species of hammerhead shark in the family Sphyrnidae. This species was historically common in the shallow coastal waters of the western Atlantic Ocean, from Venezuela to Uruguay. It favors muddy habitats with poor visibility, reflected by its relatively small eyes. Adult males and juveniles are schooling and generally found apart from the solitary adult females. Typically reaching 1.2–1.3 m (3.9–4.3 ft) in length, this shark has a unique, bright golden color on its head, sides, and fins, which was only scientifically documented in the 1980s. As in all hammerheads, its head is flattened and laterally expanded into a hammer-shaped structure called the cephalofoil, which in this species is wide and long with an arched front margin bearing central and lateral indentations.

The yellow-orange pigments of the smalleye hammerhead seem to have been acquired from the penaeid shrimp Xiphopenaeus kroyeri, the main food of juvenile sharks, and from sea catfish and their eggs, the main food of adults. The golden color may serve to conceal it from predators such as larger sharks. This species is viviparous, with the developing embryos sustained by a placental connection formed from the depleted yolk sac. Females bear litters of five to 19 pups every year following a gestation period of 10 months. Reproductive seasonality, litter size, and size at maturity vary between geographical regions. Because of its abundance, the smalleye hammerhead is an economically important bycatch of artisanal gillnet fisheries throughout its range, and is used as food. In recent years, overfishing has caused marked declines in its numbers off Trinidad, northern Brazil, and probably elsewhere. Coupled with the smalleye hammerhead's low reproductive rate, this led the International Union for Conservation of Nature to list the smalleye hammerhead as critically endangered in 2020.

== Taxonomy and phylogeny ==
Despite being one of the most easily recognizable sharks, the smalleye hammerhead has had a long history of taxonomic confusion that still remains to be fully resolved. Its scientific name originated in 1822, with French zoologist Achille Valenciennes' description of Zygaena tudes in the scientific journal Mémoires du Muséum National d'Histoire Naturelle; the specific epithet tudes is Latin for "hammer". Valenciennes made reference to three specimens, one from Nice in France, one from Cayenne in French Guiana, and one from the Coromandel Coast of India. For over two centuries, though, taxonomists believed Valenciennes' account matched the great hammerhead, which thus became known as Zygaena (later Sphyrna) tudes. The smalleye hammerhead was known by a different name, Sphyrna bigelowi, coined by Stewart Springer in a 1944 issue of Journal of the Washington Academy of Sciences.

In 1950, Enrico Tortonese examined the Nice and Cayenne specimens of S. tudes (the Coromandel specimen having been lost in the interim), and concluded that they were not great hammerheads, but rather the same species as S. bigelowi. Carter Gilbert concurred in his 1967 revision of the hammerhead sharks, noting that while the lost Coromandel specimen was probably a great hammerhead, none of the existing material belonged to that species. Thus, Sphyrna tudes became the accepted name for the smalleye hammerhead, taking precedence over S. bigelowi because it was published earlier, and the great hammerhead received the next available name Sphyrna mokarran. Gilbert designated the Nice specimen as the lectotype that would define S. tudes, having priority over the Cayenne specimen (the paralectotype). This was meant to stabilize the name, but had the opposite effect.

In 1981, Jean Cadenat and Jacques Blache revisited the type specimens of S. tudes and found that the lectotype from Nice is likely not a smalleye hammerhead, but rather a fetal whitefin hammerhead (S. couardi, likely a synonym of the scalloped hammerhead, S. lewini). This would also explain the anomalous locality of the Nice specimen, as the smalleye hammerhead is not otherwise known outside of the Americas. By the rules of binomial nomenclature, Sphyra tudes should then become the valid name for the whitefin hammerhead, taking precedence over S. couardi, and the smalleye hammerhead would revert to being Sphyrna bigelowi. Taxonomists, though, have been reluctant to change the names again, preferring to keep the smalleye hammerhead as S. tudes. For this solution to have official status would require a decision by the International Commission on Zoological Nomenclature (ICZN), to reject the Nice specimen as the lectotype and designate the Cayenne specimen in its place. The relevant petition to the ICZN has not yet been put forth.

- - Eusphyra blochii
  - - - Sphyrna mokarran
      - Sphyrna zygaena
    - - Sphyrna lewini
      - - - Sphyrna tudes
          - Sphyrna media
        - - Sphyrna tiburo
          - Sphyrna corona

Phylogenetic tree of hammerhead sharks:

Until the first detailed study of the smalleye hammerhead was carried out in 1985–86 by José Castro of Clemson University for the Food and Agriculture Organization of the United Nations, its distinctive golden coloration was unknown to science. The color fades after death, and the pigments leach into the preservative, resulting in the "yellowish cast" of museum specimens being regarded as an artifact of preservation. The names "yellow hammerhead" or "golden hammerhead" are used by fishermen in Trinidad for this shark, and the latter was promoted for wider usage by Castro. Another common name for this species is the curry shark. Phylogenetic analyses based on nuclear and mitochondrial DNA have found that the hammerheads with the smallest cephalofoils are the most derived members of their lineage. The closest relative of the smalleye hammerhead appears to be the scoophead (S. media), and the two of them in turn form a clade with the sister species pair of the scalloped bonnethead (S. corona) and the bonnethead (S. tiburo).

== Description ==
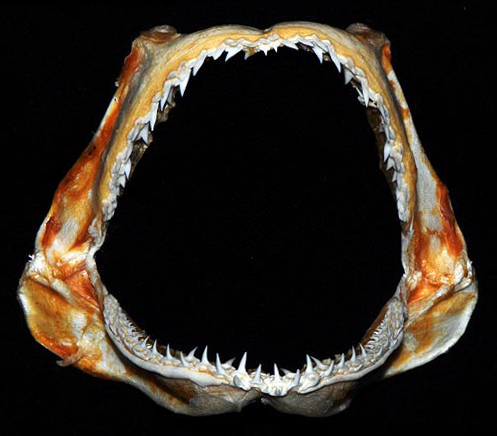
Jaws

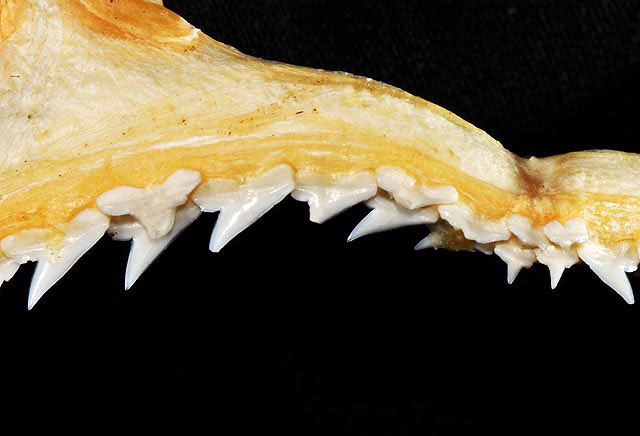
Upper teeth

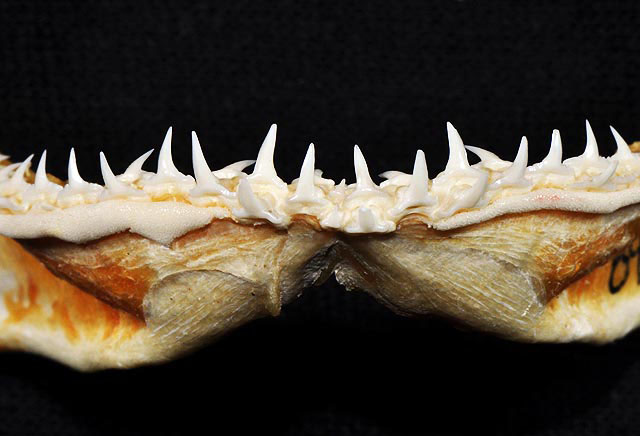
Lower teeth

One of the smaller members of its family, the smalleye hammerhead can reach a length of 1.5 m (4.9 ft), though 1.2–1.3 m (3.9–4.3 ft) is more typical, and a weight of 9 kg (20 lb). The body is streamlined and fairly slender. The mallet-shaped cephalofoil is wide and long, with a span measuring 28–32% of the body length; the leading margin forms a broad arch with indentations in the middle and on either side. The cephalofoils of newborns are longer, more arched, and less indented in front than those of adults. The eyes, placed at the ends of the cephalofoils, are proportionately smaller than in other hammerheads and equipped with nictitating membranes (protective third eyelids). The nostrils are positioned just inside of the eyes, each with a well-developed groove running towards the center of the cephalofoil. The mouth is strongly curved, containing on either side 15–16 upper tooth rows and 15–17 lower tooth rows. The teeth have single narrow cusps with smooth or weakly serrated edges, that are angled in the upper jaw and upright in the lower jaw.

The first dorsal fin is tall and slightly falcate (sickle-shaped), originating behind the pectoral fin bases; its free rear tip lies over the origin of the pelvic fins. The second dorsal fin is smaller than the first, but still rather large, with a concave, trailing margin. The pelvic fins have nearly straight trailing margins. The anal fin is taller and longer than the second dorsal fin. The caudal fin has a well-developed lower lobe and a notch near the tip of the upper lobe. The dermal denticles are oval with five horizontal ridges leading to marginal teeth. The most distinctive trait of this species is its coloration; the back and dorsal fins are gray to yellowish gray, and the cephalofoil margins, flanks, underside, pectoral fins, pelvic fins, and anal fin are bright yellow to orange with a metallic or iridescent sheen. Newborn sharks are gray above, darkening on the first dorsal fin and upper caudal fin lobe, and whitish below. They gain a bright yellow cast on their undersides by a length of 45 cm (18 in), which turns to orange by a length of 50 cm (20 in). The golden color is brightest in sharks 55–70 cm (22–28 in) long, and tends to fade with the onset of sexual maturity.

== Distribution and habitat ==
The smalleye hammerhead is found along the eastern coast of South America from Uruguay to Venezuela, though it seldom occurs further west than the Orinoco Delta southeast of Trinidad. Reports of this species from off Panama, Mexico, and western Florida are unconfirmed; records from other parts of the world are most likely erroneous, resulting from its tangled taxonomic history. This species inhabits inshore murky waters 5–40 m (16–131 ft) deep, over muddy bottoms. Segregation occurs by sex and age; newborns and juveniles under 40 cm (16 in) long are found in the shallowest waters, moving deeper after a few months of life. Adult females are mostly found at depths of 9–18 m (30–59 ft), while larger juveniles and adult males are mostly found at depths of 27–36 m (89–118 ft). This species is tolerant of brackish water, and can be found over a salinity range of 20–34 ppt.

== Biology and ecology ==
Four other species of hammerhead sharks overlap in range with the smalleye hammerhead - the small-sized scoophead and bonnethead, and the large-sized scalloped hammerhead and great hammerhead. Little competition occurs between these species because of their differing habitats and dietary preferences. The smalleye hammerhead is the dominant hammerhead in shallow, muddy areas, where high turbidity limits the utility of vision (hence its smaller eyes). Adult males and juveniles of both sexes form schools of uniform body size; these schools do not appear to relate to reproduction or migration. Adult females are apparently solitary.

Young smalleye hammerheads under 67 cm (26 in) long feed predominantly on penaeid shrimp, mostly Xiphopenaeus kroyeri. Larger sharks feed mainly on bony fishes, especially ariid sea catfish and their eggs. The shrimp and the surface mucus layer and eggs of the catfish contain carotenoid pigments that appear to be the source of the sharks' golden color; whether the pigments in the catfish also ultimately come from the shrimp is uncertain. Another shark species in the region, the yellow smooth-hound (Mustelus higmani), also feeds on shrimp and has a yellowish color, albeit not nearly as bright. This species has also been known to consume swimming crabs, squid, grunts, and newborn scalloped hammerheads. The smalleye hammerhead may fall prey to larger sharks such as the bull shark (Carcharhinus leucas), while smaller individuals may also be taken by bony fishes. Its coloration may provide camouflage. A known parasite of this species is the hexabothriid monogenean Erpocotyle schmitti; it may also serve as a host to common copepod ectoparasites such as Echthrogaleus coleoptratus, Pandarus satyrus, and P. cranchii.

Like all hammerhead sharks, the smalleye hammerhead is viviparous: when the developing embryos exhaust their supply of yolk, the depleted yolk sac develops into a placental connection through which the mother delivers nourishment. Mature females have a single functional ovary and two functional uteri. Ovulation occurs at the same time as gestation, allowing females to bear young every year. The details of the smalleye hammerhead's life history vary across its range. Off Trinidad, reproduction occurs on a well-defined annual cycle with mating in August and September, and birthing in late May and June of the following year. The females carry between five and 12 pups for 10 months, and make use of food-rich, shallow coastal bays as nursery areas. The newborns measure around 30 cm (0.98 ft) long, and males and females attain sexual maturity at 80 cm (31 in) and 98 cm (39 in) long, respectively. By contrast, smalleye hammerheads off the northern Brazilian state of Maranhão are substantially larger, with males maturing at over 92 cm (36 in) long and females at over 101 cm (40 in) long. As the litter size increases with female size, Maranhão sharks have been recorded carrying up to 19 pups. The seasonality of breeding also differs, with pregnant females found from June to October and January to April, and males in apparent reproductive condition from May to November and in March.

== Human interactions ==
Timid and harmless to humans, the smalleye hammerhead is caught incidentally by inshore artisanal multispecies fisheries throughout its range, and marketed as food. It is the most or second-most important shark caught by such fisheries off Trinidad and Tobago, Guyana, and Brazil. Because of its head shape, individuals of all ages are readily caught in gillnets; small numbers are also caught on line gear and in bottom trawls. The IUCN assessed this species as critically endangered in 2020, as it is subjected to intense fishing pressure, often without management, by techniques ranging from beach seine netting to trawling, and is unable to replenish this harvest. Smalleye hammerheads are also bycatch in commercial shrimp trawls, which are often run through the shark's shallow-water habitat. Anecdotal evidence suggests that smalleye hammerhead catches have declined significantly off Trinidad and northern Brazil, which are likely indicative of population trends in the rest of its range. The smalleye shark is federally protected in Brazil and Colombia.
