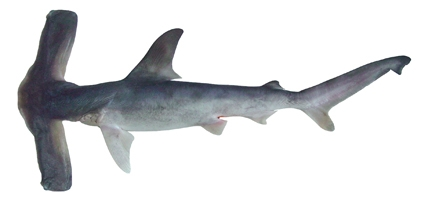

Conservation status
- Critically Endangered (IUCN 3.1)
- CITES Appendix II

Scientific classification
- Kingdom: Animalia
- Phylum: Chordata
- Class: Chondrichthyes
- Subclass: Elasmobranchii
- Division: Selachii
- Order: Carcharhiniformes
- Family: Sphyrnidae
- Genus: Eusphyra; T. N. Gill, 1862
- Species: E. blochii

Binomial name
- Eusphyra blochii (G. Cuvier, 1816)
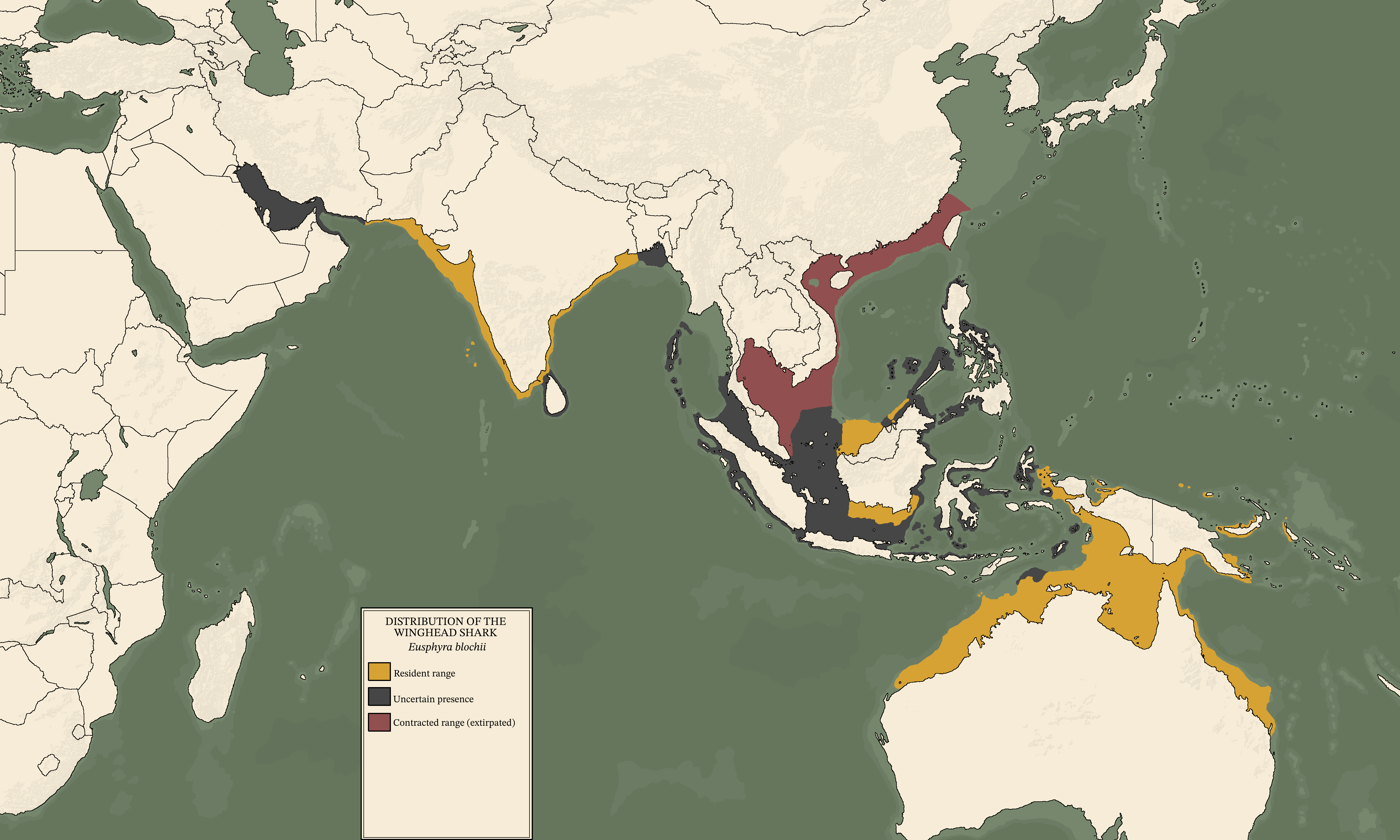
- Range of the winghead shark (IUCN)

Synonyms
- Zygaena blochii G. Cuvier, 1816; Zygaena laticeps Cantor, 1837; Zygaena latycephala van Hasselt, 1823

= Winghead shark =

Species of shark

The winghead shark (Eusphyra blochii) is a species of hammerhead shark, and part of the family Sphyrnidae. It is the sole member of the genus Eusphyra. Reaching a length of 1.9 m (6.2 ft), this small brown to gray shark has a slender body with a tall, sickle-shaped first dorsal fin. Its name comes from its exceptionally large "hammer", or cephalofoil, which can be as wide as half of the shark's total length. The function of this structure is unclear, but may relate to the shark's senses. The wide spacing of its eyes grants superb binocular vision, while the extremely long nostrils on the leading margin of the cephalofoil may allow for better detection and tracking of odor trails in the water. The cephalofoil also provides a large surface area for its ampullae of Lorenzini and lateral line, with potential benefits for electroreception and mechanoreception, respectively.

Inhabiting the shallow coastal waters of the central and western Indo-Pacific, the winghead shark feeds on small bony fishes, crustaceans, and cephalopods. It gives birth to live young, with the developing embryos receiving nourishment through a placental connection. Females produce annual litters of six to 25 pups; depending on region, birth may occur from February to June after a gestation period of 8–11 months. This harmless species is widely fished for meat, fins, liver oil, and fishmeal. The International Union for Conservation of Nature has assessed it as endangered in 2016, as it is thought to have declined in some parts of its range due to overfishing.

== Taxonomy ==
In 1785, German naturalist Marcus Elieser Bloch described a shark that he referred to Squalus zygaena (a synonym of Sphyrna zygaena, the smooth hammerhead). French zoologist Georges Cuvier, as a brief footnote to the account of S. zygaena in his 1817 Le Règne animal distribué d'après son organisation, pour servir de base à l'histoire naturelle des animaux et d'introduction à l'anatomie comparée, observed that Bloch's specimen (which he labeled "z. nob. Blochii") was not a smooth hammerhead, but rather a different species. Although Cuvier did not propose a proper binomial name, his colleague Achille Valenciennes interpreted it as such in 1822 when he described another specimen of the same species in detail, calling it Zygaena Blochii nobis and attributing the name to Cuvier.

In 1862, Theodore Gill placed the winghead shark in its own genus Eusphyra, derived from the Greek eu ("good" or "true") and sphyra ("hammer"). However, subsequent authors did not accept Eusphyra and preferred to keep this species with the other hammerheads in the genus Sphyrna. Eusphyra was resurrected by Henry Bigelow and William Schroeder in 1948, and came into wider usage after additional taxonomic research was published by Leonard Compagno in 1979 and 1988. Nevertheless, some sources still refer to this species as Sphyrna blochii. Other common names for the winghead shark include arrowhead, arrow-headed hammerhead shark, and slender hammerhead.

== Phylogeny ==
- - Eusphyra blochii
  - - - Sphyrna mokarran
      - Sphyrna zygaena
    - - Sphyrna lewini
      - - - Sphyrna tudes
          - Sphyrna media
        - - Sphyrna tiburo
          - Sphyrna corona

Phylogenetic tree of hammerhead sharks based on mitochondrial and nuclear DNA

The traditional view of hammerhead shark evolution is that species with smaller cephalofoils evolved first from a requiem shark ancestor, and later gave rise to species with larger cephalofoils. Under this interpretation, the winghead shark is the most derived hammerhead, as it has the most extreme cephalofoil morphology. However, molecular phylogenetic research based on isozymes, mitochondrial DNA, and nuclear DNA have found the opposite pattern, with the winghead shark as the most basal member of the hammerhead family. This result supports the counterintuitive idea that the first hammerhead shark to evolve had a large cephalofoil. It also supports the separation of Eusphyra from Sphyrna by keeping the latter monophyletic (including all descendants of a single ancestor). The winghead shark lineage is estimated to have diverged from the rest of the hammerheads some 15–20 million years ago during the Miocene.

== Description ==
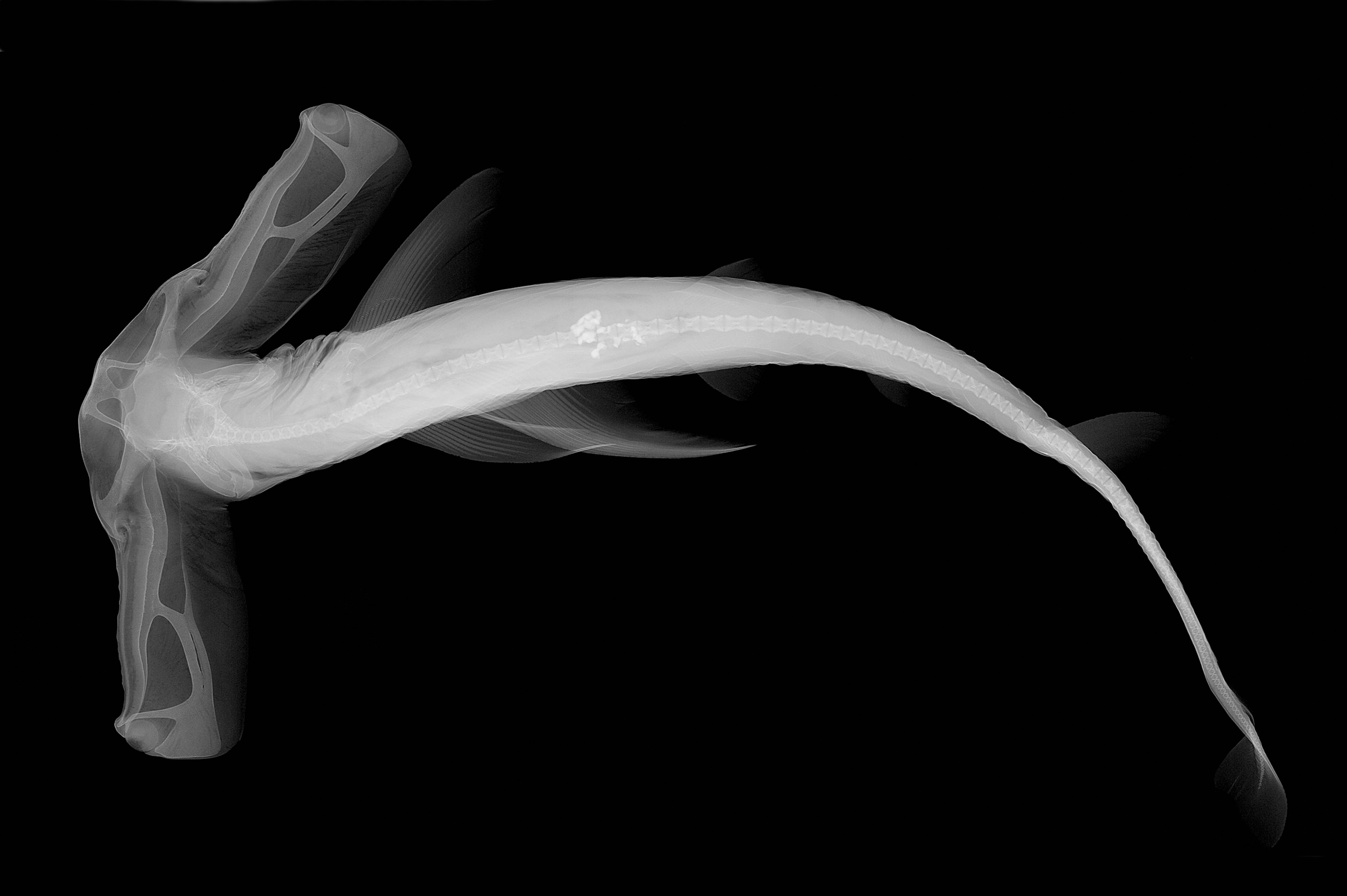
Winghead shark, X-ray image

True to its name, the winghead shark's cephalofoil consists of a pair of long, narrow, and gently swept-back blades. The width of the cephalofoil is equal to 40–50% of the shark's total length. The front of the cephalofoil has a slight indentation in the middle and a gentle bump on each side in front of the nostrils. Each nostril is roughly twice as long as the width of the mouth and extends along almost the entire leading margin of each blade. The circular eyes, located at the forward outer corners of the cephalofoil, are equipped with protective nictitating membranes. The relatively small, arched mouth contains 15–16 upper and 14 lower tooth rows on each side, and sometimes also a single row of tiny teeth at the upper and/or lower symphyses (jaw midpoints). The teeth are small and smooth-edged, with angled triangular cusps. Five pairs of gill slits are seen, with the fifth pair over the pectoral fin origins.

The body is slim and streamlined, with a very tall, narrow, and falcate (sickle-shaped) first dorsal fin that originates over the bases of the rather small pectoral fins. The second dorsal fin is much smaller and originates over the caudal third of the anal fin base. The anal fin is about half again as long as the second dorsal fin. A lengthwise groove is on the caudal peduncle at the dorsal origin of the caudal fin. The upper caudal fin lobe is longer than the lower lobe, and bears a notch in the trailing margin near the tip. The skin is covered by overlapping dermal denticles, each with three horizontal ridges leading to marginal teeth. This species is brownish gray to gray above and off-white below, and lacks fin markings. It grows up to 1.9 m (6.2 ft) long.

== Distribution and habitat ==
The winghead shark is found in the tropical central and western Indo-Pacific, from the Persian Gulf eastward across South and Southeast Asia to New Guinea and northern Queensland. Its range extends as far north as Taiwan and as far south as the Montebello Islands off Western Australia. This species inhabits shallow waters close to shore and has been known to enter estuaries.

== Biology and ecology ==
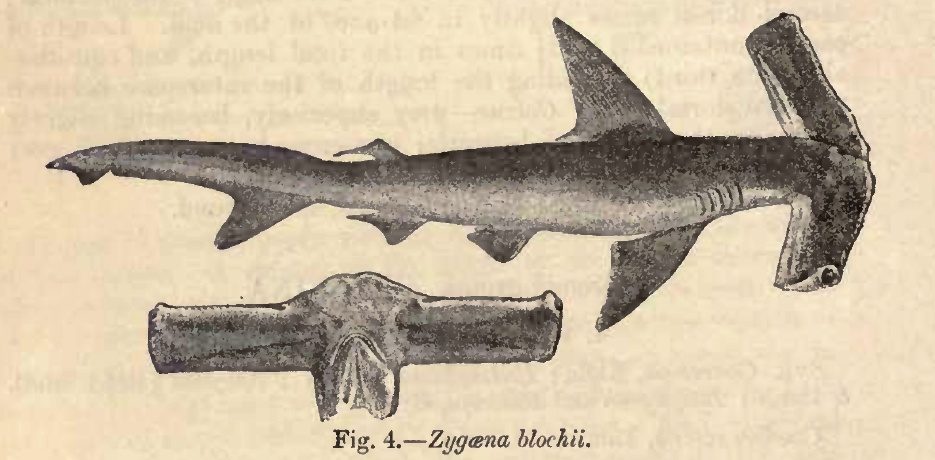
Illustration of a winghead shark from Fauna of British India (1889), showing the remarkably wide cephalofoil: The function of this structure is yet unclear.

Several nonexclusive hypotheses have been proposed to explain the extreme size of the winghead shark's cephalofoil. The placement of the eyes at the ends of the cephalofoil provides a binocular field of view of 48°, the most of any hammerhead and four times that of a requiem shark; this species thus has excellent depth perception, which may aid in hunting. This species also has proportionately the longest nostrils among the hammerheads; longer nostrils contain more chemosensory receptors and can sample more water at a time, increasing the chances of detecting an odor molecule. A winghead shark 1 m (3.3 ft) long is theoretically capable of sampling over 2,300 cm^{3} (140 in^{3}) of water per second. Another potential olfactory benefit of the cephalofoil is increased separation between the midpoints of the left and right nostrils, which enhances the shark's ability to resolve the direction of a scent trail. Finally, the cephalofoil may increase the shark's ability to detect the electric fields and movements of its prey, by providing a larger surface area for its electroreceptive ampullae of Lorenzini and mechanoreceptive lateral line. The lateral blades seem too large to function in maneuvering, which has been suggested for other hammerheads.

The winghead shark usually hunts close to the sea floor. Its diet consists mainly of small bony fishes, followed by crustaceans and cephalopods. Known parasites of this species include the tapeworms Callitetrarhynchus blochii, Heteronybelinia heteromorphi, Otobothrium carcharidis, O. mugilis, Phoreiobothrium puriensis, and Phyllobothrium blochii, the nematodes Hysterothylacium ganeshi, Pseudanisakis sp., Raphidascaroides blochii, and Terranova sp., the copepod Caligus furcisetifer, and the protozoan Eimeria zygaenae.

=== Life history ===
The winghead shark is viviparous like the rest of its family, with the developing young sustained to term by a placental connection to the mother. Adult females have a single functional ovary, on the right, and two functional uteri. Compartments form inside the uteri during pregnancy, one for each embryo. In the waters around Mumbai, the mating season is in July and August during the monsoon. The males bite at the sides of the females as a prelude to copulation. Females can reproduce every year; the litter size ranges from six to 25 pups, and increases with the size of the female. The gestation period lasts 8–9 months off western India, and 10–11 months off northern Australia. Pregnant females have been reported to quarrel with each other.

Initially, the embryo is nourished by yolk and develops in a similar fashion to other sharks. At a length of 4.0–4.5 cm (1.6–1.8 in), the cephalofoil and the fins begin to form. When the embryo is 12–16 cm (4.7–6.3 in) long, the yolk supply begins to run low and folds appear on the yolk sac and uterine wall, which later interlock to form the placenta. At this stage, the embryo has most of the features of an adult, albeit rudimentary and colorless. The blades of the cephalofoil are folded back along the body, and long external gill filaments protrude from the gill slits. At a length of 20–29 cm (7.9–11.4 in), the placenta has formed; the first teeth, dermal denticles, and skin pigmentation appear on the embryo, and the external gills are much reduced in size. By the time the embryo is 30 cm (12 in) long, it resembles a miniature version of the adult.

Birthing takes place in May and June off Mumbai and Parangipettai, in March and April in the Gulf of Mannar, and in February and March off northern Australia. The pups emerge tail first, and their cephalofoils remain folded until after birth to facilitate passage through the cloaca. The newborns measure 32–47 cm (13–19 in) in length. Sexual maturity is reached around 1.0–1.1 m (3.3–3.6 ft) long for males and 1.1–1.2 m (3.6–3.9 ft) long for females. Their maximum lifespan is at least 21 years.

== Human interactions ==
Harmless to humans, the winghead shark is caught throughout its range using gillnets, seines, stake nets, longlines, and hook-and-line. The meat is sold fresh, the fins are exported to Asia for shark fin soup, the liver is a source of vitamin oil, and the offal is processed into fishmeal. This species is taken in large numbers in some areas, such as in the Gulf of Thailand and off India and Indonesia, and anecdotal evidence indicates its population has suffered as a result. The International Union for Conservation of Nature has listed the winghead shark as endangered. This species is only infrequently caught in Australian waters, where it has been assessed regionally as least concern by the IUCN.
