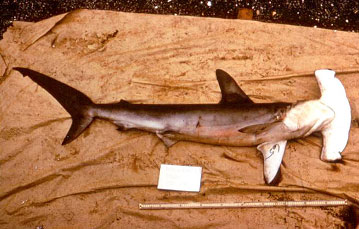

Conservation status
- Vulnerable (IUCN 3.1)
- CITES Appendix II (CITES)

Scientific classification
- Kingdom: Animalia
- Phylum: Chordata
- Class: Chondrichthyes
- Subclass: Elasmobranchii
- Division: Selachii
- Order: Carcharhiniformes
- Family: Sphyrnidae
- Genus: Sphyrna
- Species: S. zygaena

Binomial name
- Sphyrna zygaena (Linnaeus, 1758)
- Range of the smooth hammerhead

Synonyms
- Squalis pictus* Blainville, 1816; Squalus carolinensis* Blainville, 1816; Squalus zygaena Linnaeus, 1758; Zygaena malleus Valenciennes, 1822; Zygaena subarcuata Storer, 1848; Zygaena vulgaris Cloquet, 1830; * ambiguous synonym

= Smooth hammerhead =

Species of shark

The smooth hammerhead (Sphyrna zygaena) is a species of hammerhead shark, and part of the family Sphyrnidae. This species is named "smooth hammerhead" because of the distinctive shape of the head, which is flattened and laterally extended into a hammer shape (called the "cephalofoil"), without an indentation in the middle of the front margin (hence "smooth"). Unlike other hammerheads, this species prefers temperate waters and occurs worldwide at medium latitudes. In the summer, these sharks migrate towards the poles following cool water masses, sometimes forming schools numbering in the hundreds to thousands.

The second-largest hammerhead shark after the great hammerhead shark, the smooth hammerhead can measure up to 5 m (16 ft) long. It is an active predator that takes a wide variety of bony fishes and invertebrates, with larger individuals also feeding on sharks and rays. As in the rest of its family, this shark is viviparous and gives birth to litters of 20–40 pups. A relatively common shark, it is captured, intentionally or otherwise, by many commercial fisheries throughout its range; its fins are extremely valuable for use in shark fin soup. This shark is potentially dangerous and has likely been responsible for a few attacks on humans, though it is less likely to encounter swimmers than other large hammerhead species due to its temperate habitat.

== Taxonomy and phylogeny ==
The Swedish natural historian Carl Linnaeus, known as the "father of taxonomy", originally described the smooth hammerhead as Squalus zygaena in the 1758 tenth edition of Systema Naturae, without designating a type specimen. The name was later changed to Sphyrna zygaena. The specific epithet zygaena originates from the Greek word zygòn, meaning "yoke", referring to the shape of its head. The Greek name zýgaina had already been used for the hammerhead shark by Aristotle in the second book of his History of Animals. Other common names for this species include common hammerhead, common smooth hammerhead, round-headed hammerhead, or simply hammerhead.

- - Eusphyra blochii
  - - - Sphyrna mokarran
      - Sphyrna zygaena
    - - Sphyrna lewini
      - - - Sphyrna tudes
          - Sphyrna media
        - - Sphyrna tiburo
          - Sphyrna corona

Phylogenetic tree of hammerhead sharks.

Studies based on morphology have generally regarded the smooth hammerhead as one of the more derived members of its family, grouped together with the scalloped hammerhead (S. lewini) and the great hammerhead (S. mokarran). Phylogenetic analyses based on nuclear and mitochondrial DNA have concluded differently: while the smooth and great hammerheads are closely related, they are not as closely related to the scalloped hammerhead as the other Sphyrna species. Furthermore, the smooth hammerhead is among the more basal hammerhead species, indicating that the first hammerheads to evolve had large cephalofoils.

== Description ==
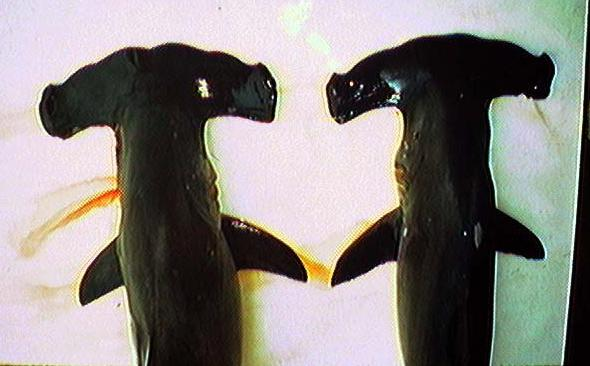
The scalloped hammerhead (left) and the smooth hammerhead (right) differ in cephalofoil shape.

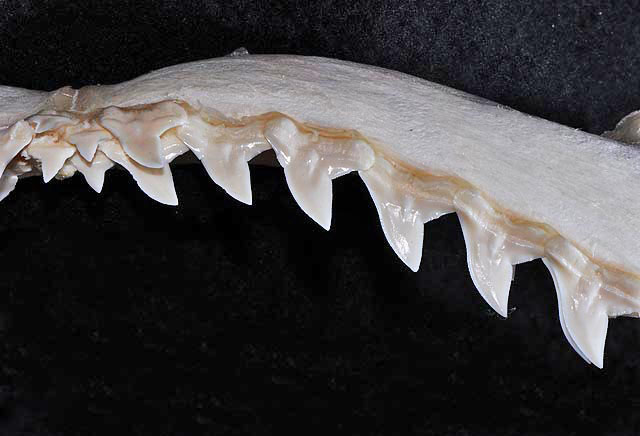
Upper teeth

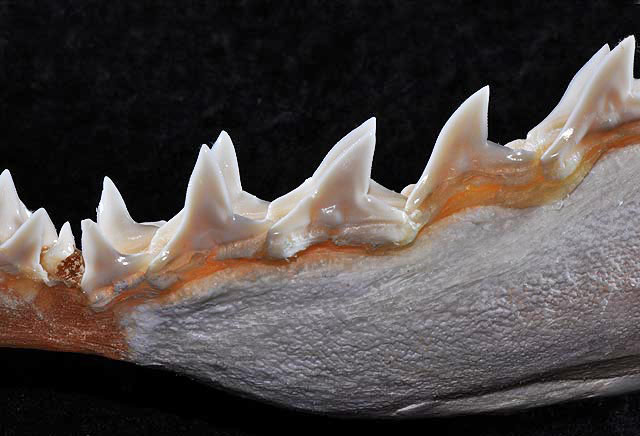
Lower teeth

The second-largest hammerhead next to the great hammerhead, the smooth hammerhead typically measures 2.5–3.5 m (8.2–11.5 ft) long, with a maximum recorded length and weight of 5 m (16 ft) and 400 kg (880 lb) respectively. The smooth hammerhead differs from other large hammerheads in the shape of its cephalofoil, which has a curved front margin without an indentation in the center. The cephalofoil is wide but short, measuring 26–29% of the body length across. The nostrils are located near the ends of the cephalofoil, with long grooves running towards the center. There are 26–32 tooth rows in the upper jaw and 25–30 tooth rows in the lower jaw. Each tooth is triangular in shape, with smooth to weakly serrated edges.

The body is streamlined, without a dorsal ridge between the two dorsal fins. The first dorsal fin is moderately tall and falcate (sickle-like) in shape, with a rounded tip. The pectoral and pelvic fins are not falcate, rather having nearly straight rear margins. The anal fin is larger than the second dorsal fin, with long free rear tip and a strong notch in the rear margin. The dermal denticles are densely packed, each with 5–7 horizontal ridges (3 in juveniles) leading to a W-shaped rear margin. The back is dark brownish gray to olive in color, in contrast to the simple brown of most other hammerheads, becoming lighter on the flanks. The belly is white, and sometimes the pectoral fins have dark edges underneath.

== Distribution and habitat ==
Of the hammerhead sharks, the smooth hammerhead is the species most tolerant of temperate water, and occurs worldwide to higher latitudes than any other species. In the Atlantic, it occurs from Nova Scotia to the Virgin Islands and from Brazil to southern Argentina in the west, and from Ireland to Côte d'Ivoire, including the Mediterranean Sea, in the east. Only 8 have been recorded in British waters, all but one (at Banffshire) in the southern part of the island and all but two (in 2004 and 2019) from more than 100 years ago. The oft-repeated claim of a 1937 capture from the Kattegat (Denmark) is incorrect, as a photo from the incident has revealed that it was a basking shark, although there was a confirmed observation of a hammerhead in the North Sea off Jutland in 2003, which most likely was a smooth hammerhead. In the Indian Ocean, it is found off South Africa, India, and Sri Lanka. In the western Pacific, it occurs from the Gulf of Tonkin to southern Japan and the Russian Far East, as well as off Australia and New Zealand. In the central and eastern Pacific, it occurs off the Hawaiian Islands, California, Panama, the Galapagos Islands, Ecuador, and Chile, with a report in 1954 of two unidentified hammerheads off British Columbia which probably were smooth hammerheads. This species is usually considered to be amphitemperate (absent from the tropics) in distribution, though there are rare reports from tropical waters such as in the Gulf of Mannar off India, and off southern Mozambique. Its presence in the tropics is difficult to determine due to confusion with other hammerhead species. Although generally preferring subtropical and warm temperate regions, a study of captures in the West Atlantic and Gulf of Mexico off the United States recorded smooth hammerheads in water temperatures ranging from 7.5 to 27.5 °C (45.5–81.5 °F).

Compared to the scalloped and great hammerheads, the smooth hammerhead stays closer to the surface, in water less than 20 m (66 ft) deep. However, it has been recorded diving to a depth of 200 m (660 ft). It prefers inshore waters such as bays and estuaries, but is sometimes found in the open ocean over the continental shelf, and around oceanic islands. This shark has also been reported entering freshwater habitats, such as the Indian River in Florida. In the summer, smooth hammerheads migrate poleward to stay in cooler water, heading back towards the equator in winter.

== Biology and ecology ==
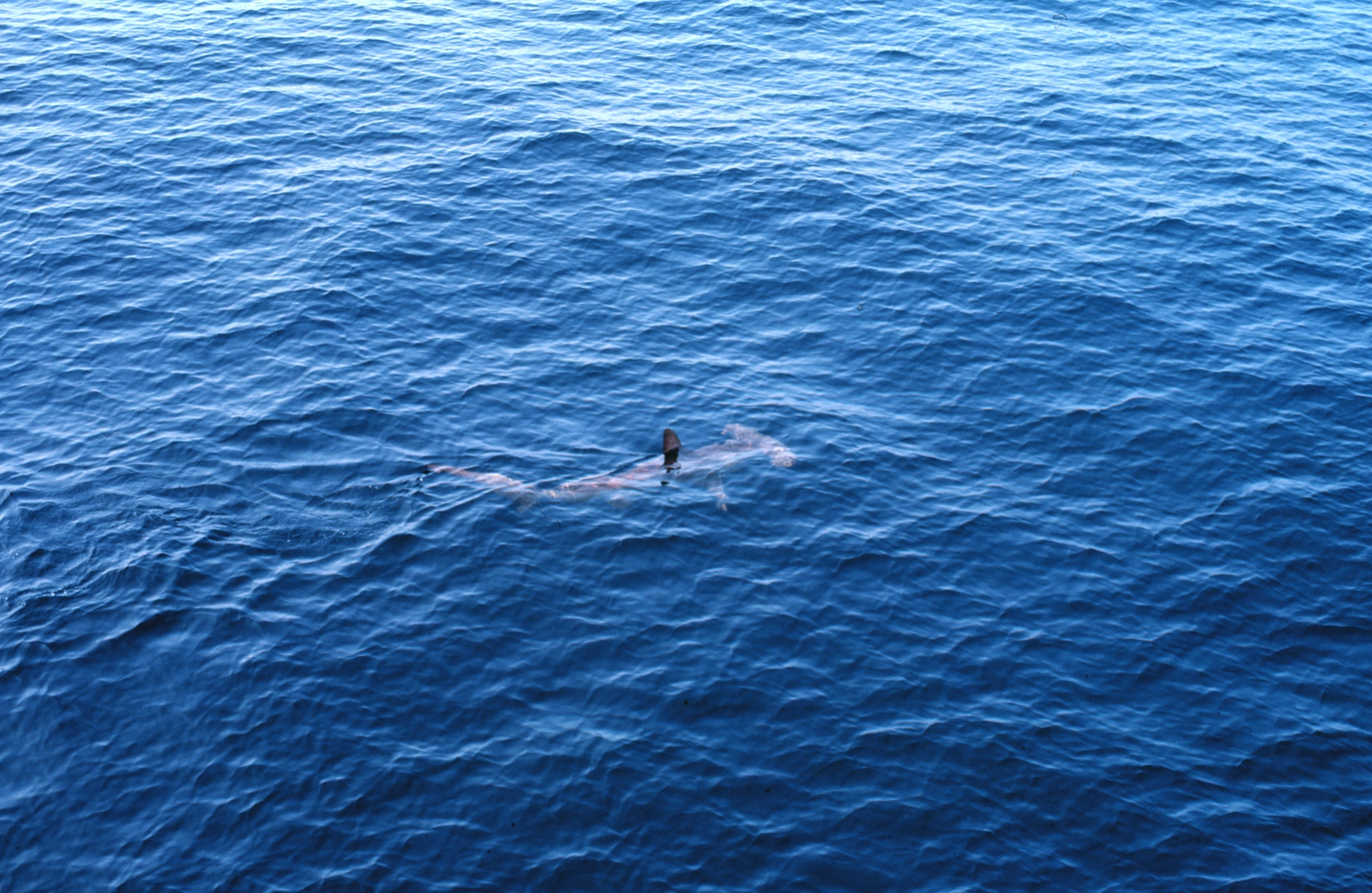
A migrating smooth hammerhead swimming with its dorsal fin exposed

Adult smooth hammerheads are either solitary or form small groups. They may come together in great numbers during their annual migrations; schools of over a hundred juveniles under 1.5 m (4.9 ft) long have been observed off the eastern Cape of South Africa, and schools thousands strong have been reported off California. During hot summer weather, they can be seen swimming just below the surface with their dorsal fins exposed. Young smooth hammerheads are preyed upon by larger sharks such as the dusky shark (Carcharhinus obscurus); adults have been observed being consumed by killer whales (Orcinus orca) off New Zealand. Known parasites of the smooth hammerhead include the nematodes Parascarophis sphyrnae and Contracaecum spp.

The smooth hammerhead is an active-swimming predator that feeds on bony fishes, rays, sharks (including of its own species), cephalopods, and to a lesser extent crustaceans such as shrimp, crabs, and barnacles. They readily scavenge from fishing lines. In some areas, stingrays are a favored prey and comprise a majority of its diet. The venomous barbs of stingrays are often found lodged in and around the mouths of these sharks; one specimen examined contained 95 such spines. In northern Europe, the smooth hammerhead feeds on herring and seabass, while in North America it takes Spanish mackerel and menhaden. Off South Africa, smooth hammerheads feed on squid such as Loligo vulgaris and small schooling fish such as pilchard over the deep coral reefs at the edge of the continental shelf, with individuals over 2 m (6.6 ft) long taking increasing numbers of smaller sharks and rays. Off Australia, squid are the most important prey, followed by bony fish. Though definitely rare, there are observations of smooth hammerheads attempting to predate on dolphins.

Like other hammerheads, the smooth hammerhead is viviparous: once the young exhaust their supply of yolk, the empty yolk sac is converted into a placental connection through which the mother delivers nourishment. Females bear relatively large litters of 20–50 pups after a gestation period of 10–11 months. Birthing occurs in shallow coastal nurseries, such as Bulls Bay in North Carolina. The pups measure 50–61 cm (20–24 in) long at birth; females reach maturity at 2.7 m (8.9 ft) long and males at 2.1–2.5 m (6.9–8.2 ft) long, depending upon locality. Off South Africa, newly mated females have been caught in February and females with full-term embryos in November; off the east coast of Australia, birthing takes place between January and March, with ovulation taking place around the same time. This shark is thought to live for 20 years or more.

== Human interactions ==
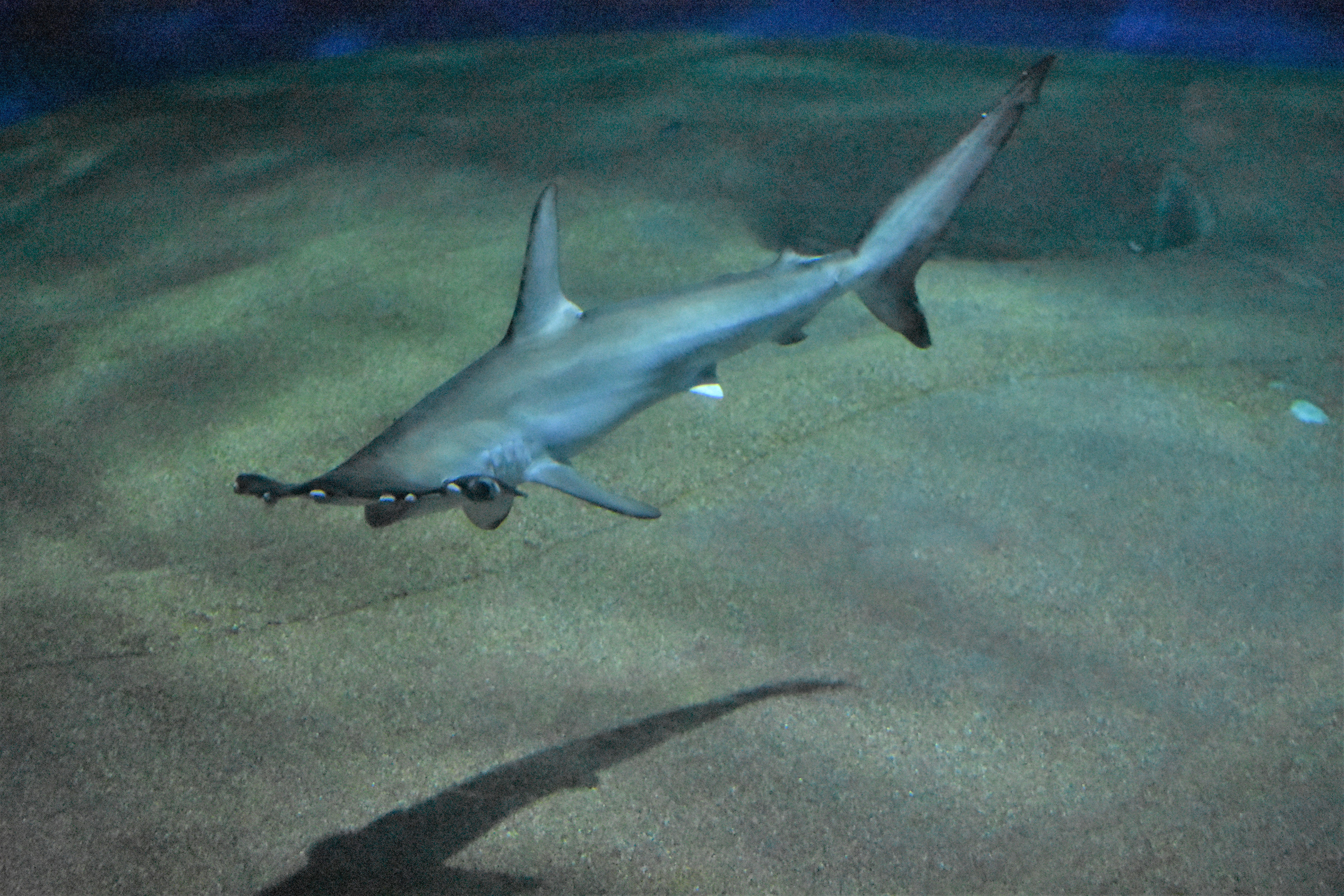
A smooth hammerhead in Aqua World, Japan

The smooth hammerhead is potentially dangerous to humans. As of 2008, the International Shark Attack File lists 34 attacks attributable to large hammerhead sharks, 17 of them unprovoked (none fatal). However, due to the smooth hammerhead's occurrence in temperate regions where people are less likely to enter the water, it was likely responsible for a minority of these attacks. Off southern California, this species has been reported to steal catches from sport fishers and divers.

Smooth hammerheads are caught by commercial fisheries throughout the world, including those off the United States (East and West Coasts), Brazil, Spain, Taiwan, the Philippines, southwestern Australia, and western Africa, primarily using gillnets and longlines. Fishery catches of smooth hammerheads are difficult to quantify due to a frequent lack of distinction between them and other large hammerheads. The meat is sold fresh, dried and salted, or smoked, though in most markets it is considered undesirable and there are reports of poisoning. Much more valuable are the fins, which have the highest rating for use in shark fin soup and often leads to captured sharks being finned at sea. Additionally, the liver oil is used for vitamins, the skin for leather, and the offal for fishmeal. This shark is also used in Chinese medicine.

Many other fisheries from every ocean also take smooth hammerheads as bycatch, and they are caught in some numbers by recreational anglers. Smooth hammerheads are also killed by entanglement in shark nets used to protect beaches. Fewer than 10 smooth hammerheads were caught annually in the nets off KwaZulu-Natal, South Africa, from 1978–1990. In contrast, in the nets off New South Wales, Australia, smooth hammerheads comprised 50% of the 4,715 sharks captured from 1972–1990. At present, this species remains relatively common and has been assessed as "Vulnerable (VU)" by the World Conservation Union. Off New Zealand, it is a prohibited target species and is the most abundant shark along the northwest coast. In June 2018 the New Zealand Department of Conservation classified the smooth hammerhead as "Not Threatened" with the qualifier "Secure Overseas" under the New Zealand Threat Classification System.

It also does not appear to have been negatively impacted by fishing off southern Australia. Off the eastern United States, catches of this species are regulated by the National Marine Fisheries Service (NMFS) Atlantic shark Fishery Management Plan (FMP), under which it is classified as a Large Coastal Shark (LCS). In 2013, the smooth hammerhead and other great elasmobranchs were added to Appendix 2 of CITES, meaning international trade (including in parts and derivatives) is regulated by the CITES permitting system.
