= Marisla Seamount =

Undersea mountain north-northeast of La Paz, Mexico

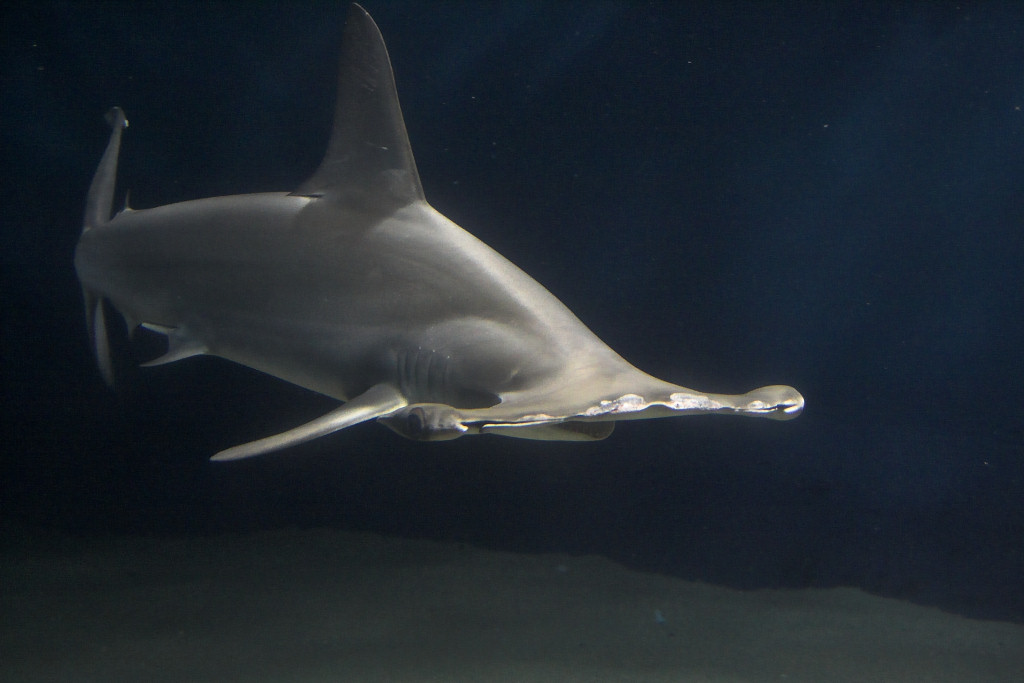
- A hammerhead shark, one of the inhabitants of the seamount
- Summit depth: 83 ft (25 m), 52 ft (16 m), 69 ft (21 m).

Location
- Location: 8 miles (13 km) NNE of La Paz, Mexico.
- Country: Baja California, Mexico

Geology
- Type: Seamount

Marisla Seamount, also known as "El Bajo", is located about 8 miles (13 km) north-northeast of La Paz, Mexico. There are three underwater peaks arrayed three hundred yards, 120°-300°; at depths of 83 ft (25 m) (northern peak), 52 ft (16 m) (central peak), and 69 ft (21 m) (southern peak).

== Name ==
Marisla Seamount was named after dive-cruise ship Marisla II (Mexican Flag), formerly USCG Cutter Columbine, owned by Maria Luisa Adcock and Richard M. Adcock. Richard was the first known sport diver, using SCUBA gear, to dive on the Seamount in 1957. Adcock began making commercial sport diving cruises to the sea mount utilizing Marisla (a converted LCM 56) and continued the dive business with Marisla II from 1968 through 2009. Marisla and Marisla II have both been scrapped.
