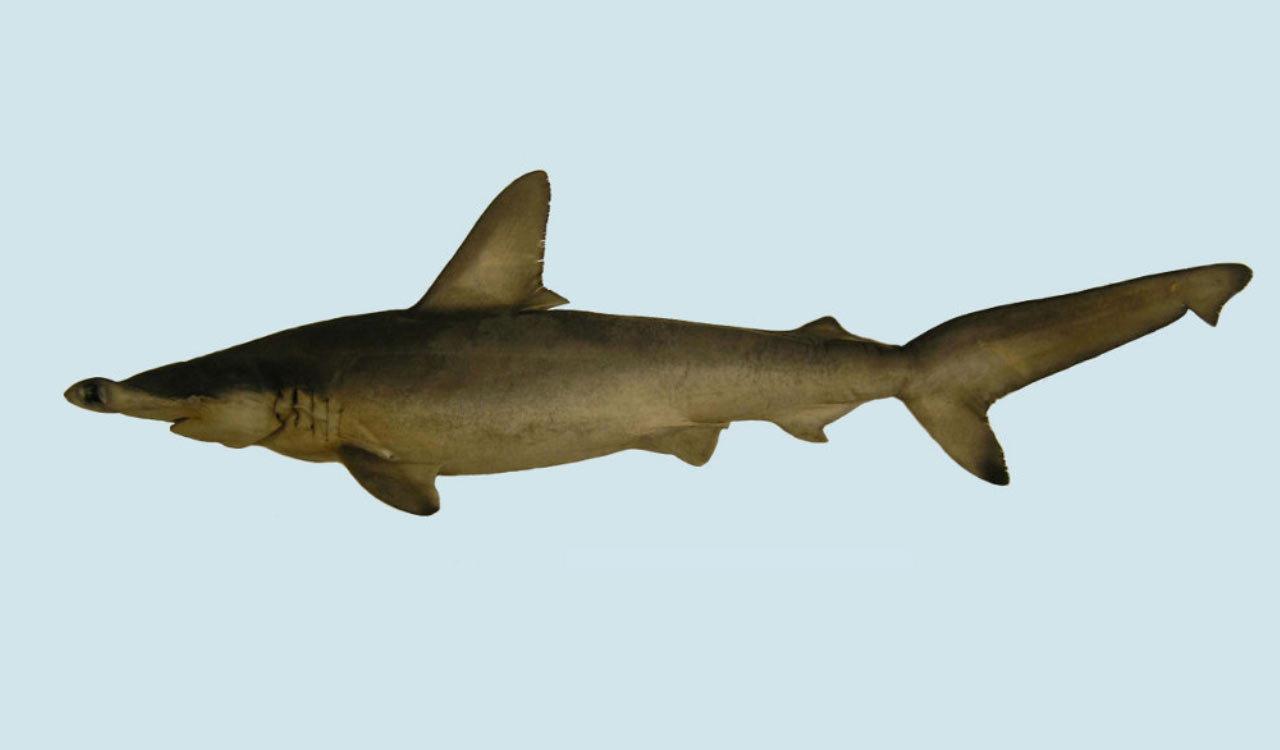

Conservation status
- Data Deficient (IUCN 3.1)
- CITES Appendix II

Scientific classification
- Kingdom: Animalia
- Phylum: Chordata
- Class: Chondrichthyes
- Subclass: Elasmobranchii
- Division: Selachii
- Order: Carcharhiniformes
- Family: Sphyrnidae
- Genus: Sphyrna
- Species: S. gilberti

Binomial name
- Sphyrna gilberti Quattro, Driggers, Grady, Ulrich & M. A. Roberts, 2013

= Carolina hammerhead =

Species of shark

The Carolina hammerhead (Sphyrna gilberti) is a species of hammerhead shark, and part of the family Sphyrnidae, found in the western Atlantic Ocean. Their pupping grounds are in nearshore waters off the southeastern U.S. with the highest concentrations found in Bulls Bay, South Carolina. The Carolina hammerhead has also been found in nearshore waters off of Brazil. It was formally described in 2013.

Little is known about the habits of the species. It is a sister species to S. lewini. Having been described in 2013, this species has been a relatively new addition to the hammerhead shark genus. The species possesses a major genetic difference from their cousins. The most notable differences are the lower vertebral number and a lighter outer tone. The Carolina hammerhead is named in honor of Carter Gilbert, who unknowingly recorded the first known specimen of the shark off Charleston, South Carolina, in 1967. Dr. Gilbert, who was the curator of the Florida Museum of Natural History from 1961 to 1998, caught what he believed was an anomalous scalloped hammerhead shark with ten fewer vertebrae than a typical scalloped hammerhead. It was not confirmed to be a different species altogether until Quattro's discovery in 2013. The general diet of the Carolina hammerheads consists of bony fishes and cephalopods such as squids, octopuses, and cuttlefishes. They also feed on shrimps, lobsters, crabs, and other smaller sharks and rays.
