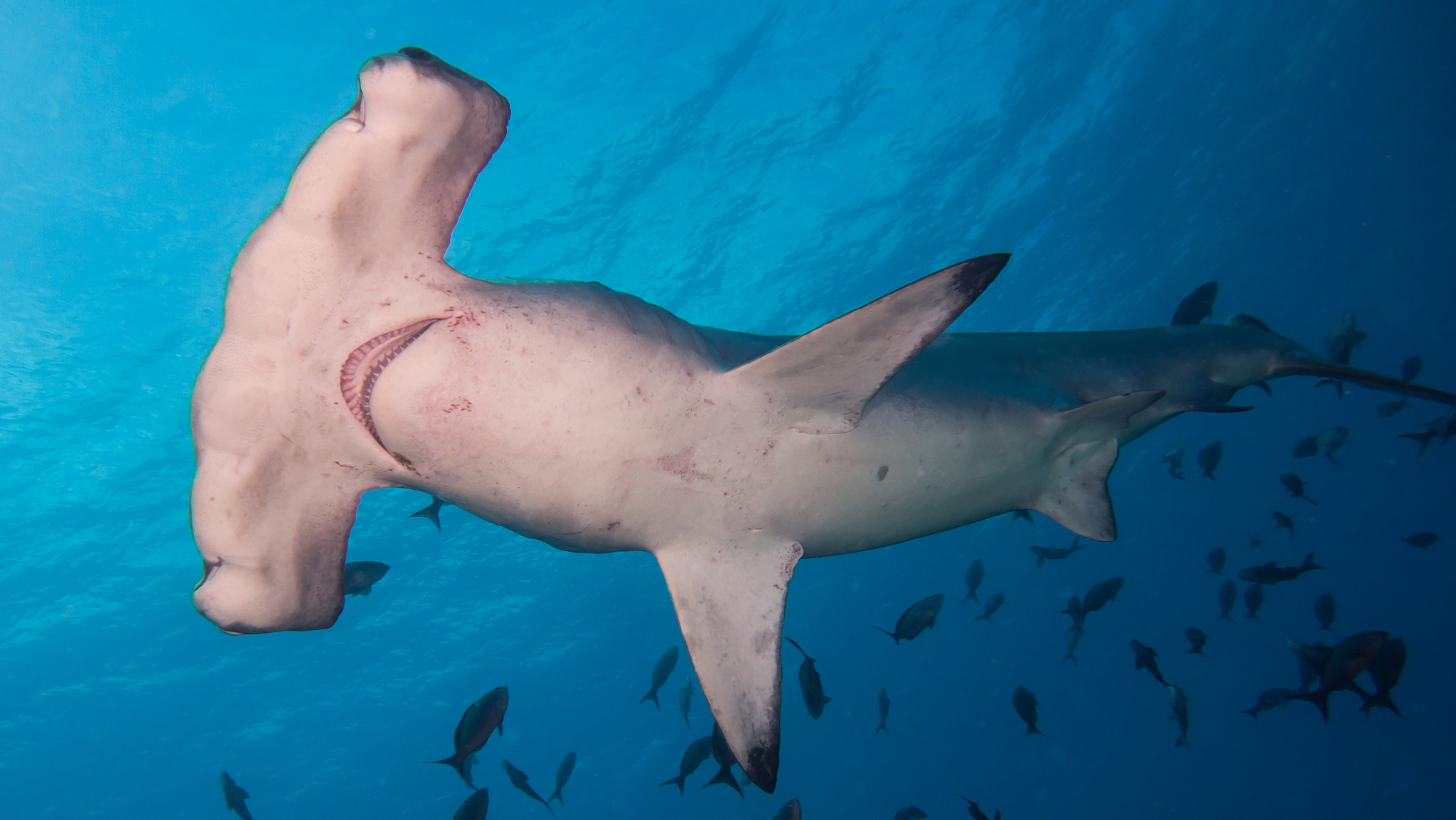
- Scalloped hammerhead as seen off the coast of Cocos Island

Scientific classification
- Kingdom: Animalia
- Phylum: Chordata
- Class: Chondrichthyes
- Subclass: Elasmobranchii
- Division: Selachii
- Order: Carcharhiniformes
- Suborder: Carcharhinoidei
- Family: Sphyrnidae; T. N. Gill, 1872

Genera
- Eusphyra; Sphyrna

= Hammerhead shark =

Hammerhead sharks Temporal range: Eocene–recent

Family of sharks

The hammerhead sharks are a group of sharks that form the family Sphyrnidae, named for the unusual and distinctive form of their heads, which are flattened and laterally extended into a cephalofoil (a T-shape or "hammer"). The shark's eyes are placed one on each end of this T-shaped structure, with their small mouths directly centered and underneath. Most hammerhead species are placed in the genus Sphyrna, while the winghead shark is placed in its own genus, Eusphyra. Many different—but not necessarily mutually exclusive—functions have been postulated for the cephalofoil, including sensory reception, manoeuvering, and prey manipulation. The cephalofoil gives the shark superior binocular vision and depth perception, as well as increased surface area for electroreceptors.

Hammerheads are found worldwide, preferring life in warmer waters along coastlines and continental shelves. Unlike most sharks, some hammerhead species will congregate and swim in large schools during the day, becoming solitary hunters at night.

== Description ==
Scalloped hammerhead swimming

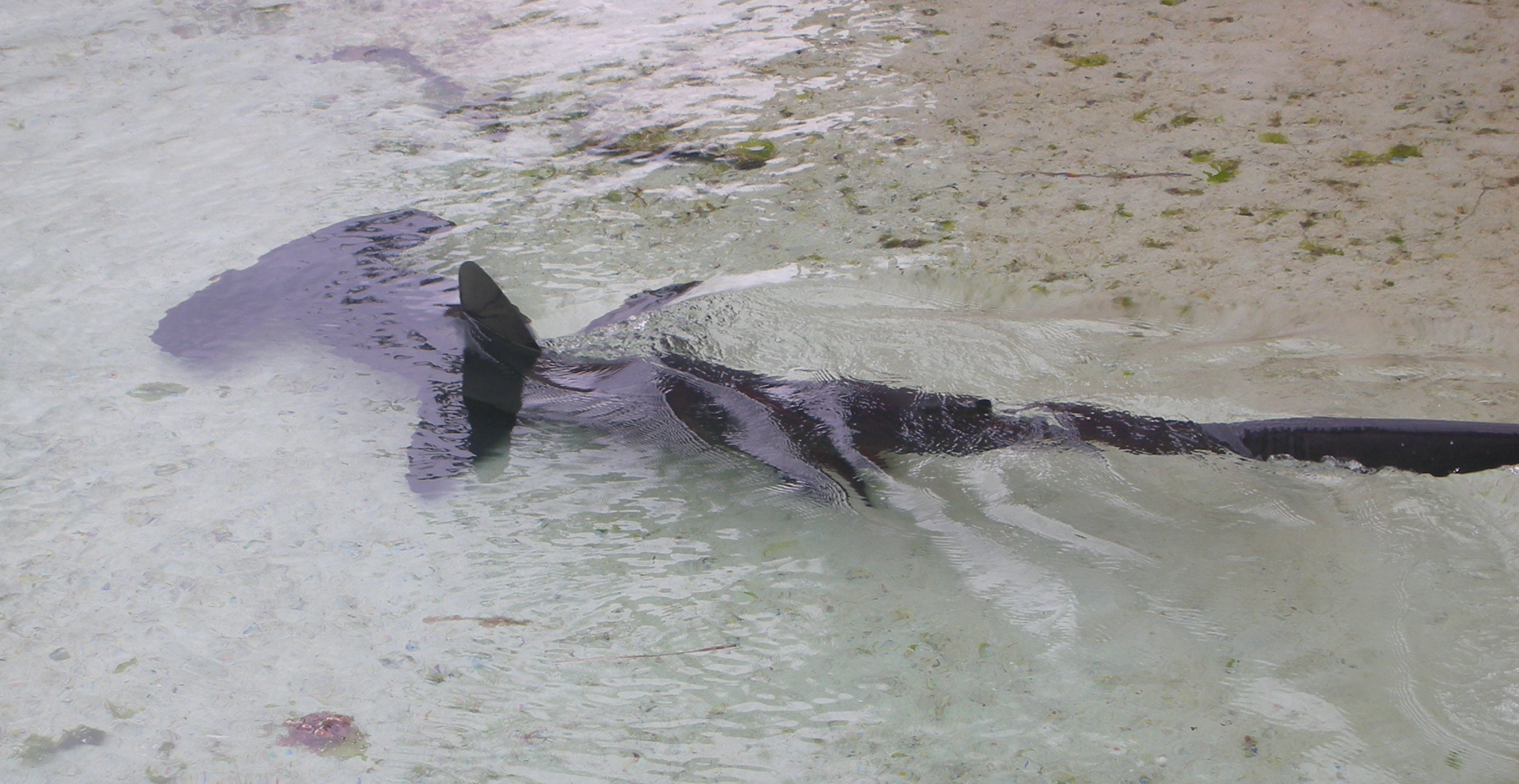
A hammerhead shark in shallow water

Hammerhead shark species vary in length and weight. The largest species, the great hammerhead, has an average length of 13.1 feet (4.0 m) and weight of 500 pounds (230 kg). The smallest species, the bonnethead shark, can reach 5 feet (1,5 m) in length and 24 pounds (10,8 kg) in weight. One specimen caught off the Florida coast in 1906 weighed over 680 kg (1,500 lb). They are usually light gray and have a greenish tint. Their bellies are white, which allows them to blend into the background when viewed from below and sneak up to their prey. Their heads have lateral projections that give them a hammer-like shape. While overall similar, this shape differs somewhat between species; examples are: a distinct T-shape in the great hammerhead, a rounded head with a central notch in the scalloped hammerhead, and an unnotched rounded head in the smooth hammerhead.

Hammerheads have disproportionately small mouths compared to other shark species. Some species are also known to form schools. In the evening, like most other sharks, they become solitary hunters. National Geographic explained that hammerheads can be found in warm, tropical waters, but during the summer, they begin a mass migration period in search of colder waters.

== Taxonomy and evolution ==
Because sharks do not have mineralized bones and rarely fossilize, only their teeth are commonly found as fossils. Their closest relatives are the requiem sharks (Carcharinidae). Based on a recent combined molecular and paleontological study, the ancestor of the hammerheads probably lived in the Cretaceous or Paleocene. Definitive fossils of the family date back to the Eocene. Prior DNA studies had estimated the family to have arisen in the Miocene, about 20 million years ago.

Using mitochondrial DNA, a phylogenetic tree of the hammerhead sharks showed the winghead shark as sister to the rest of the hammerhead sharks. As the winghead shark has proportionately the largest "hammer" of the hammerhead sharks, this suggests that the first ancestral hammerhead sharks also had large hammers.

=== Cephalofoil ===
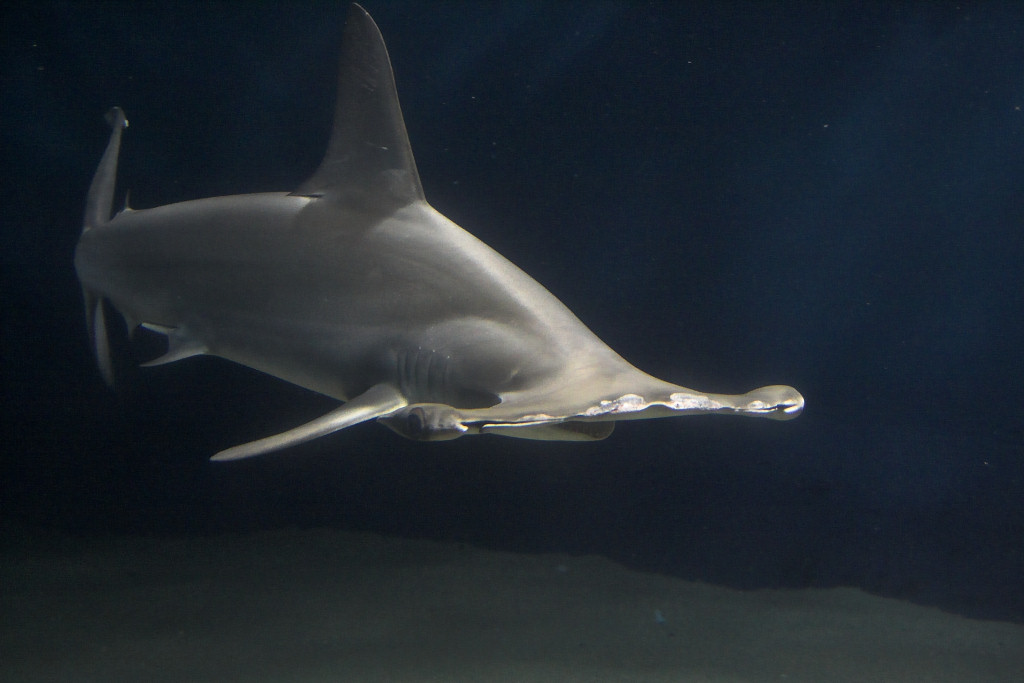
The hammer-like shape of the head enhances sensory ability – positioning eyes to excel and widely distributing electroreceptors – enabling hammerhead sharks to search for prey more effectively.

The hammer-like shape of the head may have evolved at least in part to enhance the animal's vision. The positioning of the eyes, mounted on the sides of the shark's distinctive hammer head, allows 360° of vision in the vertical plane, meaning the animals can see above and below them at all times. They also have an increased binocular vision and depth of visual field as a result of the cephalofoil.

The shape of the head was previously thought to aid in close-quarters maneuverability, allowing sharp turning movement without losing stability. However, the unusual structure of its vertebrae instead has been found to be instrumental in making the turns correctly, more so than the shape of its head (though it would also shift and provide lift).

From what is known about the winghead shark, the shape of the hammerhead apparently has to do with an evolved sensory function. Like all sharks, hammerheads have electroreceptory sensory pores called ampullae of Lorenzini. The pores on the shark's head lead to sensory tubes, which detect electric fields generated by other living creatures. By distributing the receptors over a wider area, like a larger radio antenna, hammerheads can sweep for prey more effectively.

== Reproduction ==
Reproduction occurs only once a year for hammerhead sharks, and usually occurs with the male shark biting the female shark violently until she agrees to mate with him. The hammerhead sharks exhibit a viviparous mode of reproduction with females giving birth to live young. Like other sharks, fertilization is internal, with the male transferring sperm to the female through one of two intromittent organs called claspers. The developing embryos are at first sustained by a yolk sac. When the supply of yolk is exhausted, the depleted yolk sac transforms into a structure analogous to a mammalian placenta (called a "yolk sac placenta" or "pseudoplacenta"), through which the mother delivers sustenance until birth. Once the baby sharks are born, they are not taken care of by the parents in any way. Usually, a litter consists of 12 to 15 pups, except for the great hammerhead, which gives birth to litters of 20 to 40 pups. These baby sharks huddle together and swim toward warmer water until they are old and large enough to survive on their own.

In 2007, the bonnethead shark was found to be capable of asexual reproduction via automictic parthenogenesis, in which a female's ovum fuses with a polar body to form a zygote without the need for a male. This was the first shark known to do this.

== Diet ==
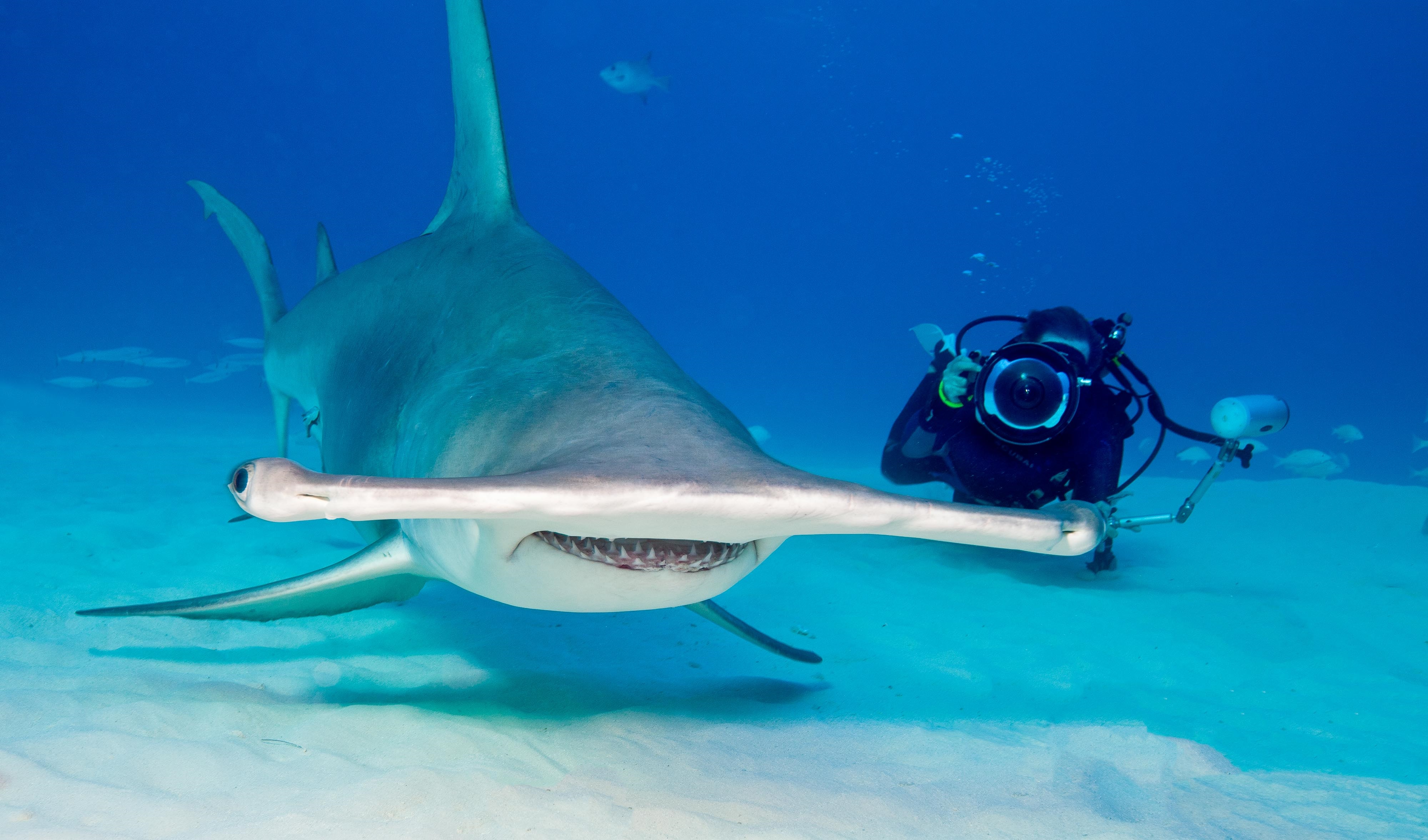
A great hammerhead gliding along the sea bed

Hammerhead sharks eat a large range of prey such as fish (including other sharks), squid, octopus, and crustaceans. Stingrays are a particular favorite, with the positioning of their (comparatively) smaller, crescent-shaped mouths underneath their T-shaped heads allowing for skilled skate, ray, and flounder hunting, among other seafloor-dwellers. These sharks will often be found swimming above the sand along the bottom of the ocean, stalking their prey. Their unique heads are further utilized as a tool (or weapon) if hunting rays and flatfishes; the shark uses its head to pin down and briefly stun the prey, and only eats once their quarry is clearly weakened and in shock. The great hammerhead, tending to be larger and more aggressive to its own kind than other hammerheads, occasionally engages in cannibalism, eating other hammerhead sharks, including mothers consuming their own young. In addition to the typical animal prey, bonnetheads have been found to feed on seagrass, which sometimes makes up as much as half their stomach contents. They may swallow it unintentionally, but they are able to partially digest it. At the time of discovery, this was the only known case of a potentially omnivorous species of shark (since then, whale sharks were also found to be omnivorous).

== Species ==
There are ten distinct species of Hammerhead sharks in the wild:

Species	Common names	IUCN Red List status	Population trend	References
Eusphyra blochii	Winghead shark	Critically endangered	Decreasing	
Sphyrna alleni	Shovelbill shark	Not Evaluated	Unknown	
Sphyrna corona	Scalloped bonnethead	Critically Endangered	Decreasing	
Sphyrna gilberti	Carolina hammerhead	Data Deficient	Unknown	
Sphyrna lewini	Scalloped hammerhead	Critically Endangered	Decreasing	
Sphyrna media	Scoophead	Critically Endangered	Decreasing	
Sphyrna mokarran	Great hammerhead	Critically Endangered	Decreasing	
Sphyrna tiburo	Bonnethead	Endangered	Decreasing	
Sphyrna tudes	Smalleye hammerhead	Critically Endangered	Decreasing	
Sphyrna zygaena	Smooth hammerhead	Vulnerable	Decreasing	

== Relationship with humans ==
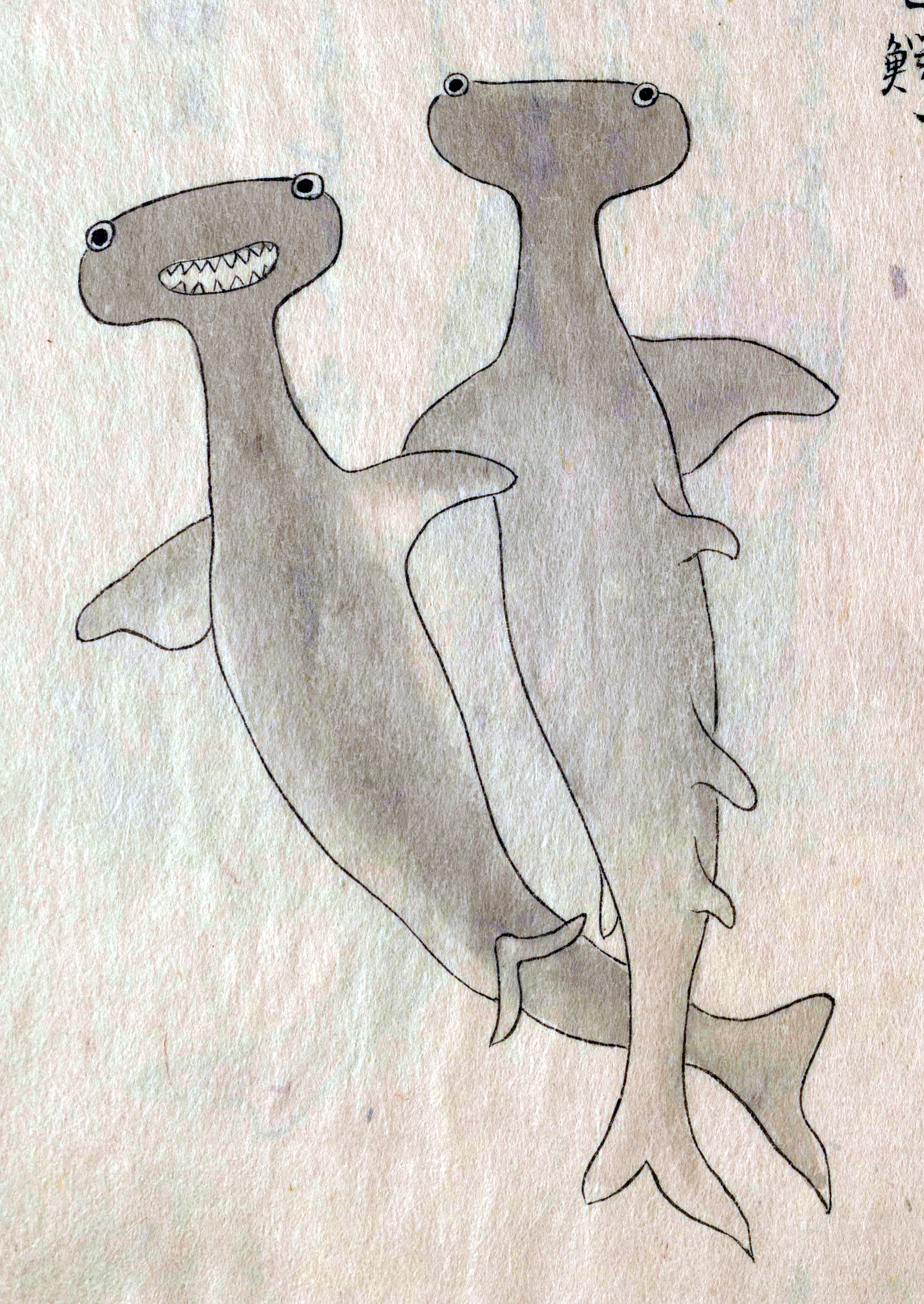
Hammerhead shark illustration from 1735, Japan, from the Illustrated Guide to the Products of Oki Province

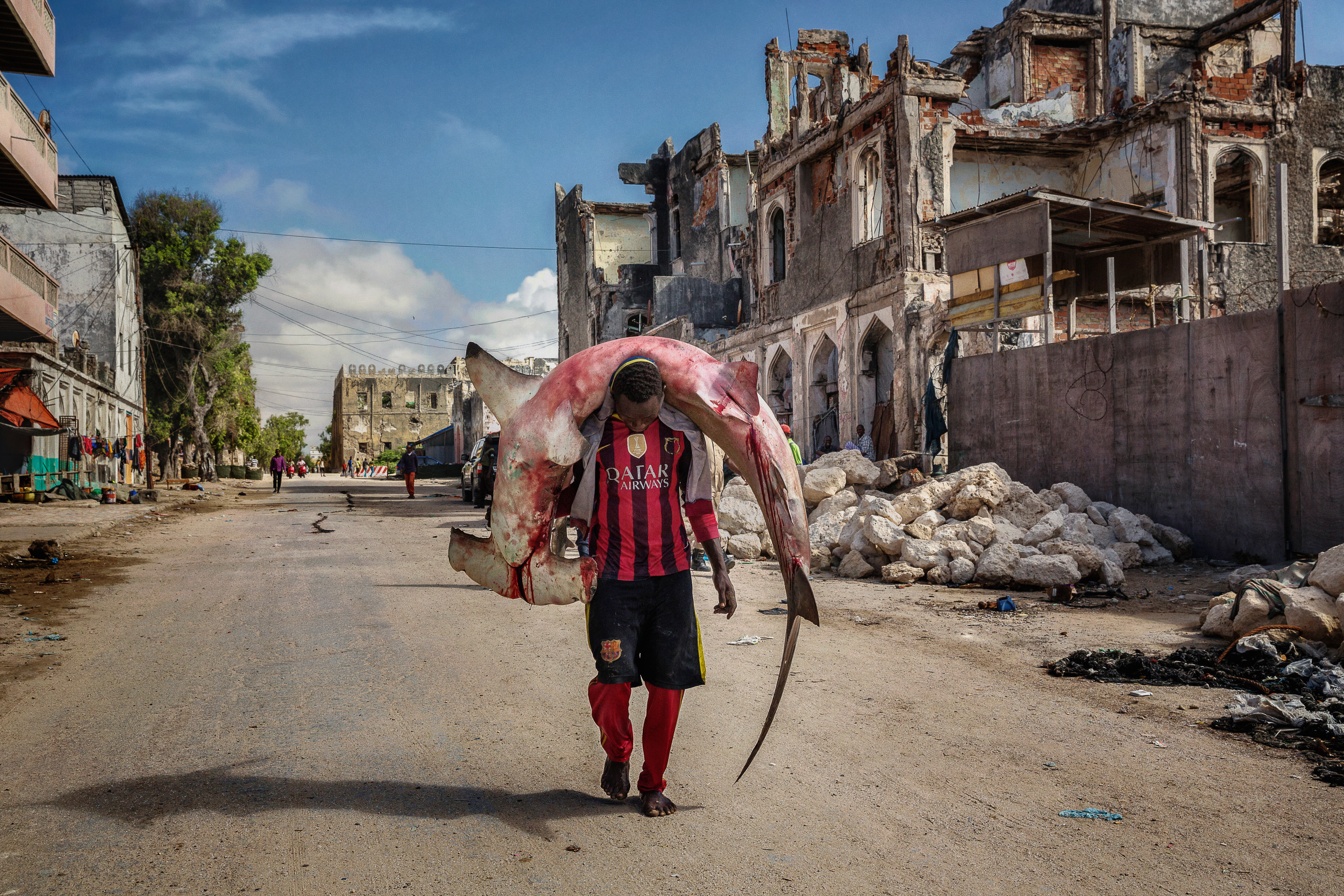
Man carrying a scalloped hammerhead shark along a street in Mogadishu, Somalia

According to the International Shark Attack File, humans have been subjects of 17 documented, unprovoked attacks by hammerhead sharks within the genus Sphyrna since AD 1580. No human fatalities have been recorded. Most hammerhead shark species are too small to inflict serious damage to humans.

The great and the scalloped hammerheads are listed on the World Conservation Union's (IUCN) 2008 Red List as endangered, whereas the smalleye hammerhead is listed as vulnerable. The status given to these sharks is as a result of overfishing and demand for their fins, an expensive delicacy. Among others, scientists expressed their concern about the plight of the scalloped hammerhead at the American Association for the Advancement of Science annual meeting in Boston. The young swim mostly in shallow waters along shores all over the world to avoid predators.

Shark fins are prized as a delicacy in certain countries in Asia (such as China and Japan), and overfishing is putting many hammerhead sharks at risk of extinction. Fishermen who harvest the animals typically cut off the fins and toss the remainder of the fish, which is often still alive, back into the sea. This practice, known as finning, is lethal to the shark.

=== In captivity ===
The relatively small bonnethead is regular at public aquariums, as it has proven easier to keep in captivity than the larger hammerhead species, and it has been bred at a handful of facilities. Nevertheless, at up to 1.5 m (5 ft) in length and with highly specialized requirements, very few private aquarists have the experience and resources necessary to maintain a bonnethead in captivity. The larger hammerhead species can reach more than twice that size and are considered difficult, even compared to most other similar-sized sharks (such as Carcharhinus species, lemon shark, and sand tiger shark) regularly kept by public aquariums. They are particularly vulnerable during transport between facilities, may rub on surfaces in tanks, and may collide with rocks, causing injuries to their heads, so they require very large, specially adapted tanks. As a consequence, relatively few public aquaria have kept them for long periods. The scalloped hammerhead is the most frequently maintained large species, and it has been kept long term at public aquaria in most continents, but primarily in North America, Europe, and Asia. In 2014, fewer than 15 public aquaria in the world kept scalloped hammerheads. Great hammerheads have been kept at a few facilities in North America, including Atlantis Paradise Island Resort (Bahamas), Adventure Aquarium (New Jersey), Georgia Aquarium (Atlanta), Mote Marine Laboratory (Florida), and the Shark Reef at Mandalay Bay (Las Vegas). Smooth hammerheads have also been kept in the past.

== Protection ==
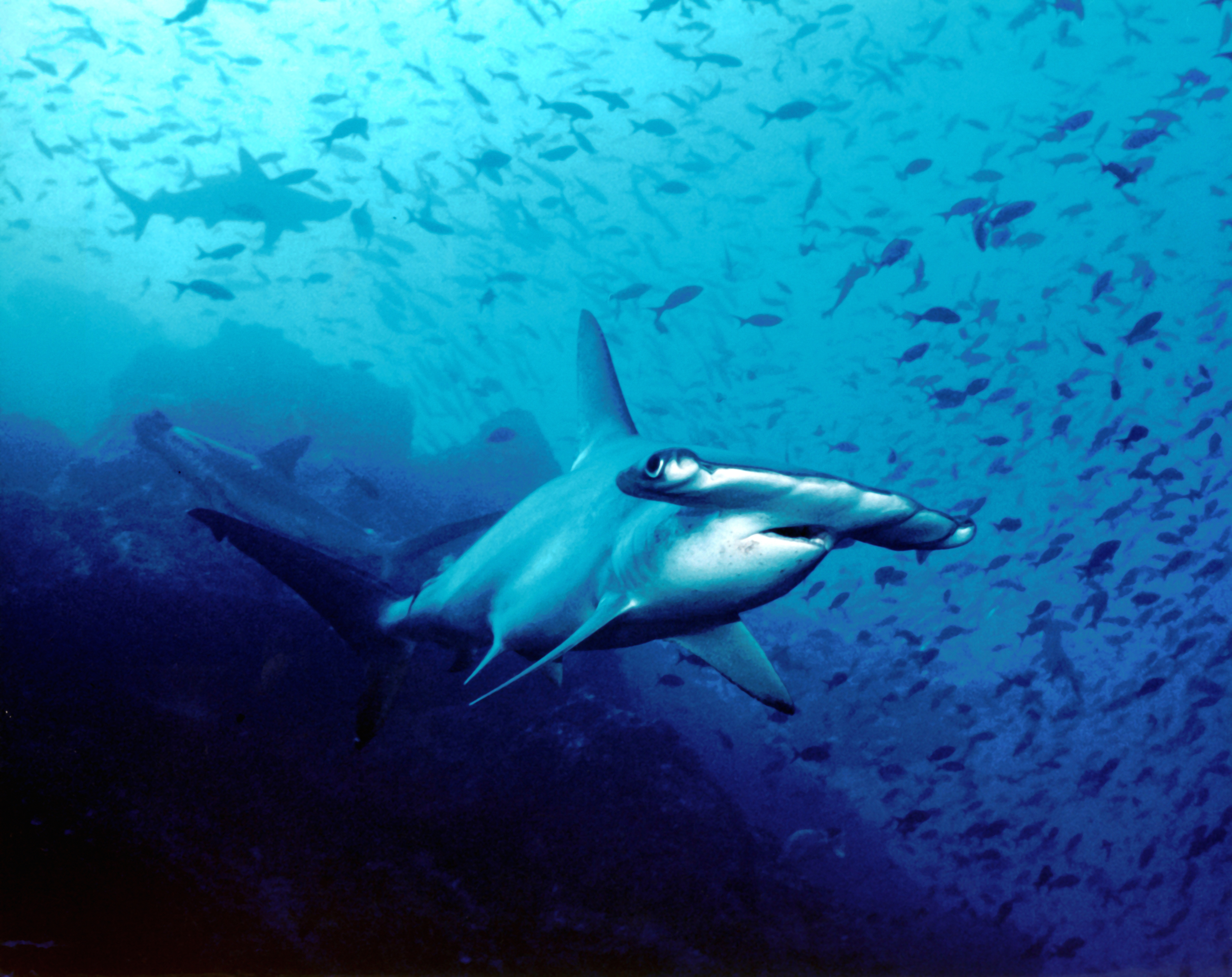
Most, if not all, hammerhead shark species are threatened with extinction.

Humans are the main threat to hammerhead sharks. Although they are not usually the primary target, hammerhead sharks are caught in fisheries all over the world. Tropical fisheries are the most common place for hammerheads to be caught because of their preference to reside in warm waters. The total number of hammerheads caught in fisheries is recorded in the Food and Agriculture Organization of the United Nations Global Capture Production dataset. The number steadily increased from 75 metric tons in 1990, to 6,313 metric tons by 2010.

Shark fin traders say that hammerheads have some of the best quality fin needles which makes them good to eat when prepared properly. Hong Kong is the world's largest fin trade market and accounts for about 1.5% of the total annual amount of fins traded. It is estimated that around 375,000 great hammerhead sharks alone are traded per year which is equivalent to 21,000 metric tons of biomass. However, most sharks that are caught are only used for their fins and then discarded. The meat of hammerheads is generally unwanted. Consumption of hammerhead meat has been recorded in Trinidad and Tobago, Venezuela, Kenya and Japan. Hammerhead sharks are particularly vulnerable to overfishing due to their tendency to form large aggregations, making them easy targets for commercial fishing operations. Recent genetic studies indicate that population fragmentation may further threaten their long-term survival, as isolated populations show reduced genetic diversity.

In March 2013, three endangered, commercially valuable sharks, the hammerheads, the oceanic whitetip, and porbeagle, were added to Appendix II of CITES, bringing shark fishing and commerce of these species under licensing and regulation.

== Cultural significance ==
Among Torres Strait Islanders, the hammerhead shark, known as the beizam, is a common family totem and often represented in cultural artefacts such as the elaborate headdresses worn for ceremonial dances, known as dhari (dari). They are associated with law and order. Renowned artist Ken Thaiday Snr is known for his representations of beizam in his sculptural dari and other works.

In native Hawaiian culture, sharks are considered to be gods of the sea, protectors of humans, and cleaners of excessive ocean life. Some of these sharks are believed to be family members who died and have been reincarnated into shark form, but others are considered man-eaters, also known as niuhi. These sharks include great white sharks, tiger sharks, and bull sharks. The hammerhead shark, also known as mano kihikihi, is not considered a man-eater or niuhi; it is considered to be one of the most respected sharks of the ocean, an aumakua. Many Hawaiian families believe that they have an aumakua watching over them and protecting them from the niuhi. The hammerhead shark is thought to be the birth animal of some children. Hawaiian children who are born with the hammerhead shark as an animal sign are believed to be warriors and are meant to sail the oceans. Hammerhead sharks rarely pass through the waters of Maui, but many Maui natives believe that their swimming by is a sign that the gods are watching over the families, and the oceans are clean and balanced.

The dried and modified remains of hammerhead sharks may have inspired the legend of the Blemmye.

== See also ==
- List of hammerhead sharks
- List of prehistoric cartilaginous fish
