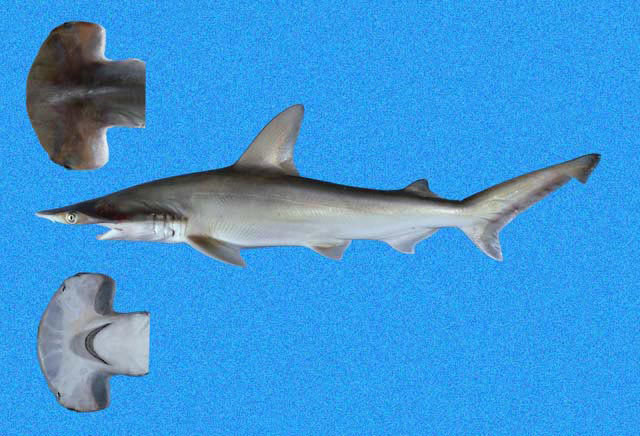

Conservation status
- Critically Endangered (IUCN 3.1)
- CITES Appendix II

Scientific classification
- Kingdom: Animalia
- Phylum: Chordata
- Class: Chondrichthyes
- Subclass: Elasmobranchii
- Division: Selachii
- Order: Carcharhiniformes
- Family: Sphyrnidae
- Genus: Sphyrna
- Species: S. media

Binomial name
- Sphyrna media S. Springer, 1940
- Range of the scoophead

= Scoophead =

Scoophead Temporal range: Early Miocene to present

Species of shark

The scoophead (Sphyrna media) is a little-known species of hammerhead shark, part of the family Sphyrnidae. It inhabits the tropical waters of the western Atlantic Ocean, from Panama to southern Brazil, and in the eastern Pacific Ocean from the Gulf of California to Ecuador, and probably northern Peru, as well. It is found in shallow, inshore habitats.

One of the smaller hammerheads, the scoophead measures 150 cm long; adult males measure 90 cm long and adult females 100–133 cm. It is distinguished by its moderately broad, mallet-shaped head (22–33% as wide as the body is long). The forward margin of the head is arched, with weak medial and lateral indentations and no prenarial grooves, traits that this species shares with the scalloped bonnethead (Sphyrna corona). It is distinguished from the scalloped bonnethead by its shorter snout, broadly arched mouth, and deeply concave anal fin. The first dorsal fin is moderately falchate, and the second dorsal fin is as tall as the anal fin. The pelvic fins are not falchate, with a straight to moderately concave rear margin. Its coloration is grey-brown above, light below, with no fin markings.

Off the coast of Trinidad, the scoophead coexists with two other small hammerheads, the bonnethead (Sphyrna tiburo) and the golden hammerhead (S. tudes). These species avoid competition by diet and habitat differences; the scoophead feeds on small elasmobranchs, octopus, squid, and flounders. Like other hammerheads, the scoophead is viviparous, with the pups measuring 34 cm or less at birth. It is taken with bottom longlines, gillnets, and hook and line throughout its range. It is caught commercially and sold as fresh fish or turned into fishmeal. The scoophead is also a common bycatch of the gillnet mackerel fishery off Trinidad.

The earliest fossil teeth of this species are from the Early Miocene of Brazil. Fossil teeth become more widespread along the eastern coast of the United States and Pacific coast of South America from the Middle Miocene onwards.

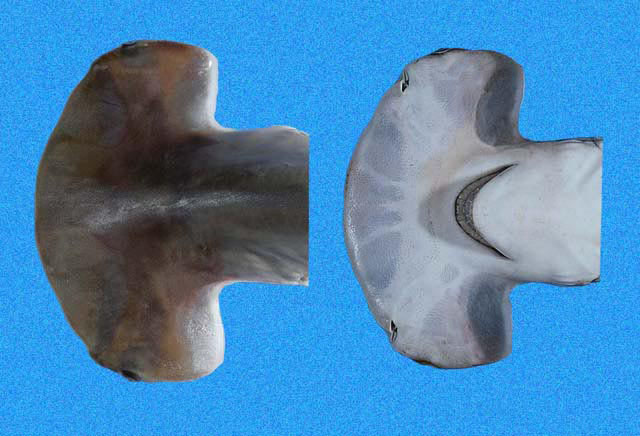
Head

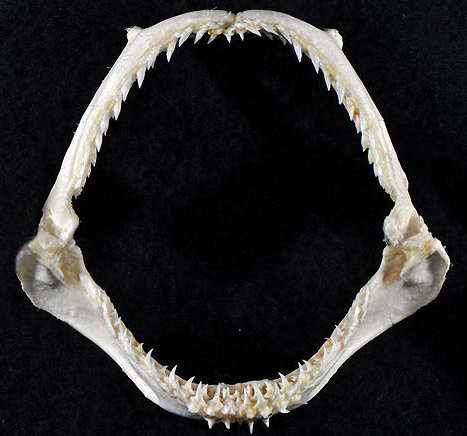
Jaws

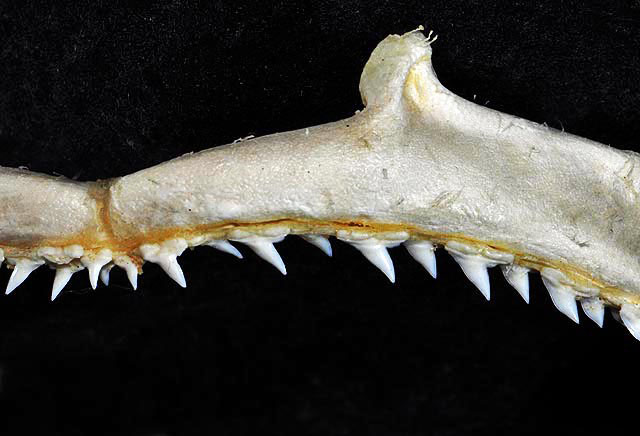
Upper teeth

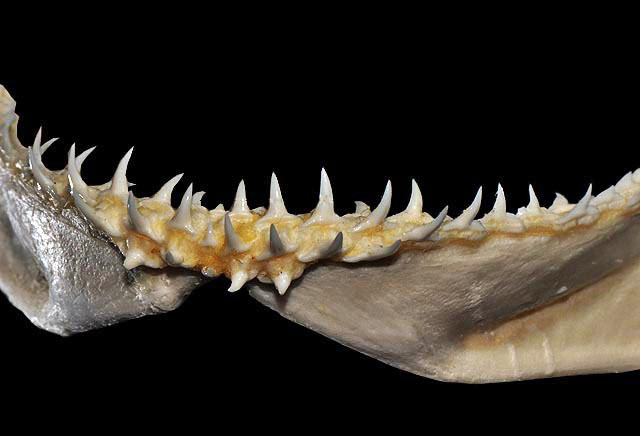
Lower teeth
