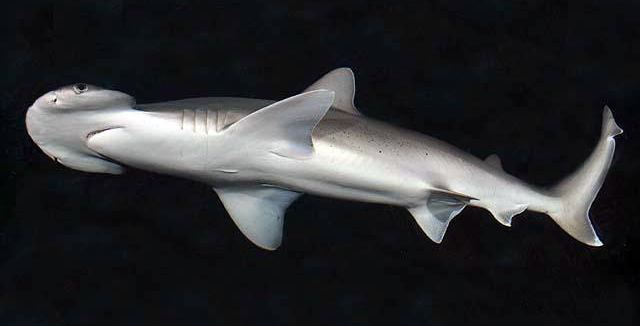

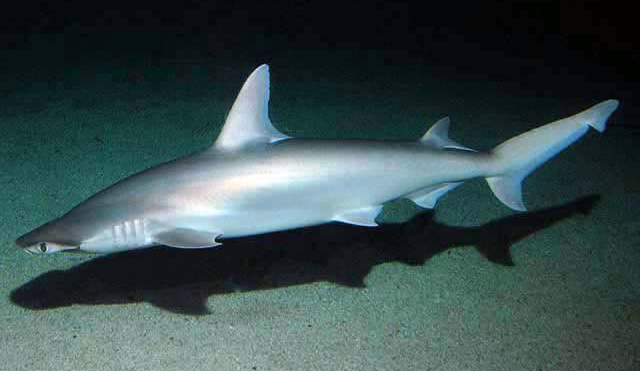

Conservation status
- Endangered (IUCN 3.1)
- CITES Appendix II

Scientific classification
- Kingdom: Animalia
- Phylum: Chordata
- Class: Chondrichthyes
- Subclass: Elasmobranchii
- Division: Selachii
- Order: Carcharhiniformes
- Family: Sphyrnidae
- Genus: Sphyrna
- Species: S. tiburo

Binomial name
- Sphyrna tiburo (Linnaeus, 1758)
- Range of the bonnethead shark

= Bonnethead =

Bonnethead shark

Species of shark

The bonnethead (Sphyrna tiburo), also called a bonnet shark or shovelhead, is the smallest member of the hammerhead shark genus Sphyrna, and part of the family Sphyrnidae. It is an abundant species in the littoral zone of the North Atlantic and the Gulf of Mexico, is the only shark species known to display sexual dimorphism in the morphology of the head, and is one of two shark species known to be omnivorous.

== Description ==
The shark is characterized by a broad, smooth, spade-like head: it has the smallest cephalofoil (hammerhead) of all Sphyrna species. The body is grey-brown above and lighter on the underside. Typically, bonnethead sharks are about 80–90 cm (2.6–3.0 ft) long, with a maximum size of about 150 cm (4.9 ft). The generic name Sphyrna probably derives from a misspelling of sphyra, the Greek word for "hammer"; the specific name tiburo derives from the Spanish word tiburón, meaning "shark".

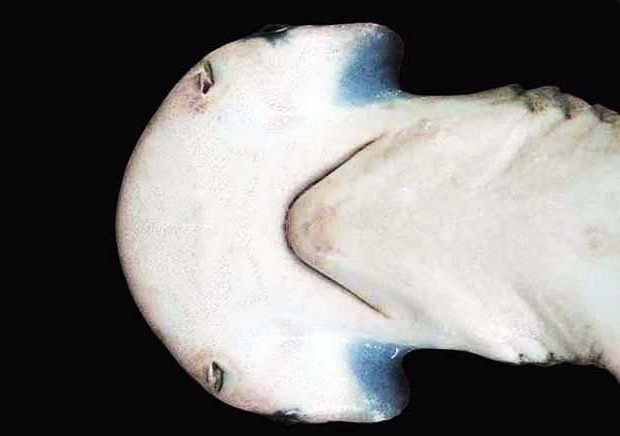
Head, underside

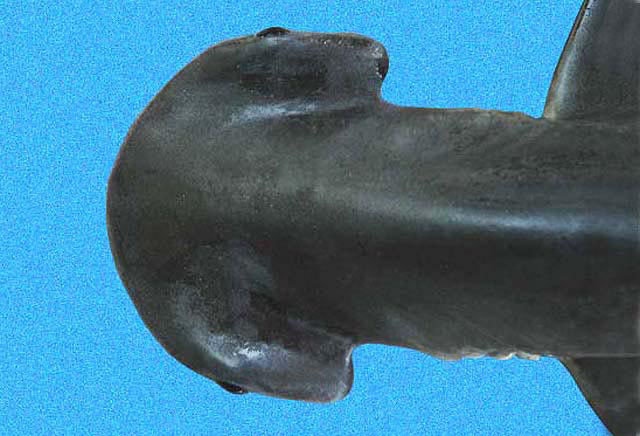
Head, upper side

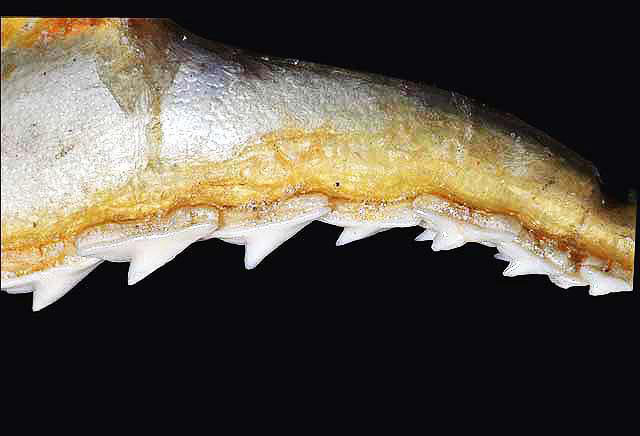
Upper teeth

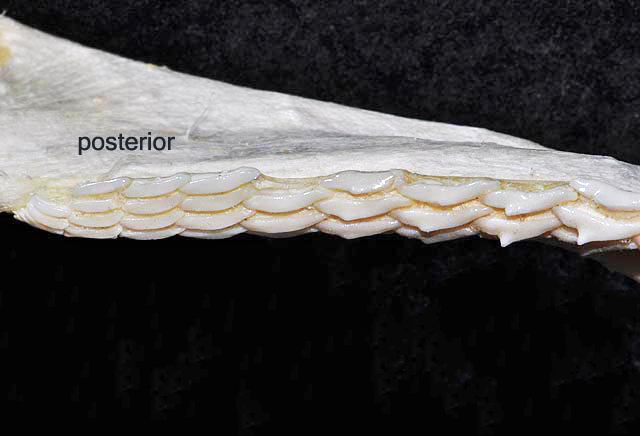
Upper teeth, posterior

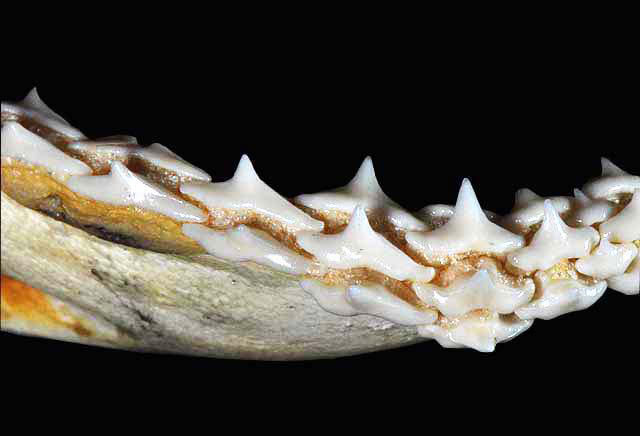
Lower teeth

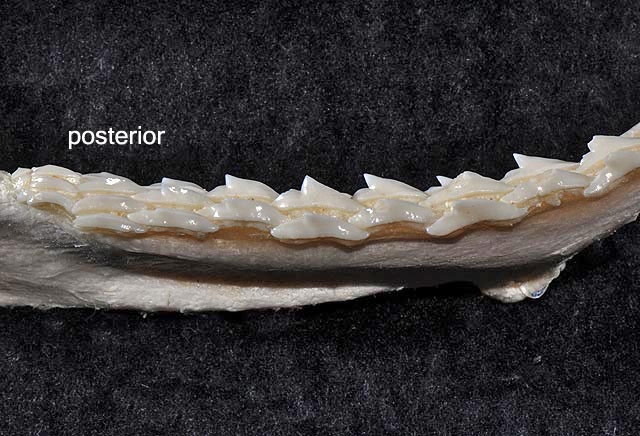
Lower teeth, posterior

== Morphology ==
=== Sexual dimorphism ===
Bonnethead sharks are the only sharks known to exhibit sexual dimorphism in the morphology of the head. Adult females have a broadly rounded head, whereas males possess a distinct bulge along the anterior margin of the cephalofoil. This bulge is formed by the elongation of the rostral cartilages of the males at the onset of sexual maturity and corresponds temporally with the elongation of the clasper cartilages.

=== Pectoral fins and swimming ===
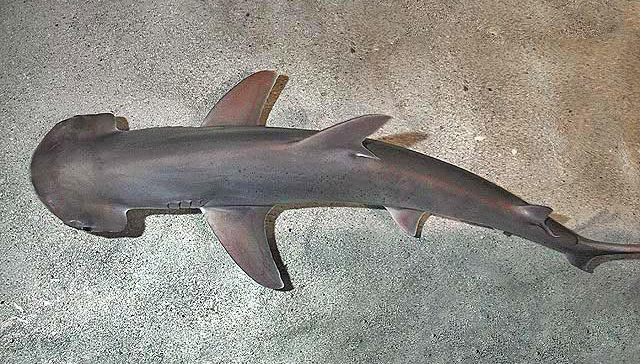
Dorsal view showing the pectoral fins

The pectoral fins on most fish control pitching (up-and-down motion of the body), yawing (the side-to-side motion), and rolling. Most hammerhead sharks do not yaw or roll and achieve pitch using their cephalofoils. The smaller cephalofoil of a bonnethead shark is not as successful, so they have to rely on the combination of cephalofoils and their large pectoral fins for most of their motility. Compared to other hammerheads, bonnethead sharks have larger and more developed pectoral fins and are the only species of hammerhead to actively use pectoral fins for swimming.

== Evolution ==
Using data from mtDNA analysis, a scientist has found that the evolution of hammerhead sharks probably began with a taxon that had a highly pronounced cephalofoil (most likely similar to that of the winghead shark, Eusphyra blochii), and was later modified through selective pressures. Thus, judging by their smaller cephalofoil, bonnethead sharks are the more recent developments of a 25-million-year evolutionary process.

== Distribution and habitat ==
This species occurs on both sides of the American coast, in regions where the water is usually warmer than 70 °F (21 °C). In the Atlantic, it ranges from New England, where it is rare, to the Gulf of Mexico and Brazil, and in the Pacific it ranges from southern California to northern Peru. During the summer, it is common in the inshore waters of the Carolinas and Georgia; in spring, summer, and fall, it is found off Florida and in the Gulf of Mexico. In the winter, the bonnethead shark is found closer to the equator, where the water is warmer. While it is still abundant in the North Atlantic Ocean and Gulf of Mexico, it has become significantly less common in the Caribbean Sea, and has been nearly extirpated from most of its South Atlantic and Pacific range.

It frequents shallow estuaries and bays over seagrass, mud, and sandy bottoms.

== Ecology ==
=== Behavior ===
The bonnethead shark is an active tropical shark that swims in small groups of five to 15 individuals, although schools of hundreds or even thousands have been reported. They move constantly following changes in water temperature and to maintain respiration. The bonnethead shark sinks if it does not keep moving, since hammerhead sharks are among the most negatively buoyant of marine vertebrates.

=== Diet ===
The shark feeds primarily on crustaceans, consisting mostly of blue crabs, but also shrimp, mollusks, and small fish. Its feeding behavior involves swimming across the seafloor, moving its head in arc patterns like a metal detector, looking for minute electromagnetic disturbances produced by crabs and other creatures hiding in the sediment. Upon discovery, it sharply turns around and bites into the sediment where the disturbance was detected. If a crab is caught, the bonnethead shark uses its teeth to grind its carapace and then uses suction to swallow. To accommodate the many types of animals on which it feeds, the bonnethead shark has small, sharp teeth in the front of the mouth (for grabbing soft prey) and flat, broad molars in the back (for crushing hard-shelled prey).

Bonnetheads also ingest large amounts of seagrass, which has been found to make up around 62.1% of gut content mass. The species was the first shark to be discovered to be omnivorous, with the whale shark being the second case. The shark may perform this activity to protect its stomach against the spiny carapaces of the blue crab which it feeds on. A 2018 study with a carbon isotope-labelled seagrass diet found that they could digest seagrass with at least moderate efficiency, with 50±2% digestibility of seagrass organic matter, and had cellulose-component-degrading enzyme activity in their hindgut.

=== Reproduction ===
The bonnethead shark is viviparous. Females reach sexual maturity at around a length of 32 inches (81 cm), while males reach maturity around 24 inches (61 cm). Four to twelve pups are born in late summer and early fall, measuring 12 to 13 in (300 to 330 mm).

Bonnetheads have one of the shortest gestation periods among sharks, lasting only 4.5–5.0 months.

A bonnethead female produced a pup by parthenogenesis. The birth took place at the Henry Doorly Zoo in Nebraska; DNA analysis showed a perfect match between mother and pup.

== Conservation ==
The bonnethead was formerly classified as a least-concern species by the IUCN. It is heavily targeted by commercial and recreational fisheries and constitutes up to 50% of all small shark landings in the eastern US, but is still reasonably abundant there as well as in the Atlantic coasts of the Bahamas and Mexico. However, significant declines have been reported in the Caribbean Sea and Atlantic Central America and massive declines along with widespread disappearance on the Atlantic coast of South America as well as most of the shark's Pacific range, leading it to be uplifted to "Endangered" in 2020. The decline of the Bonnethead population has been largely attributed to the demand globally for their meat and fins.

Since October 2021, S. tiburo has been classified as Largely Depleted by the IUCN.
