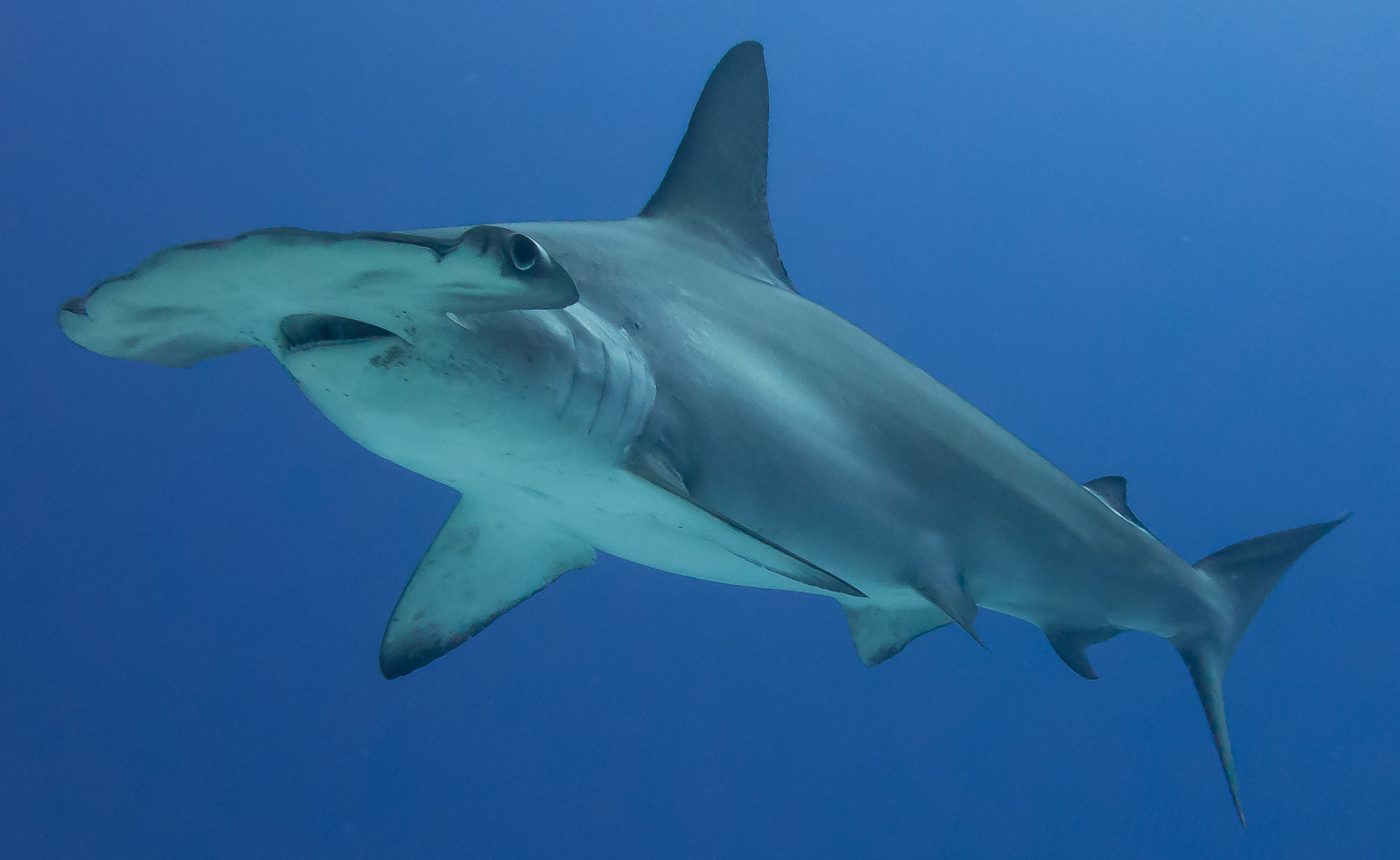
- Scalloped hammerhead off Cocos Island, Costa Rica
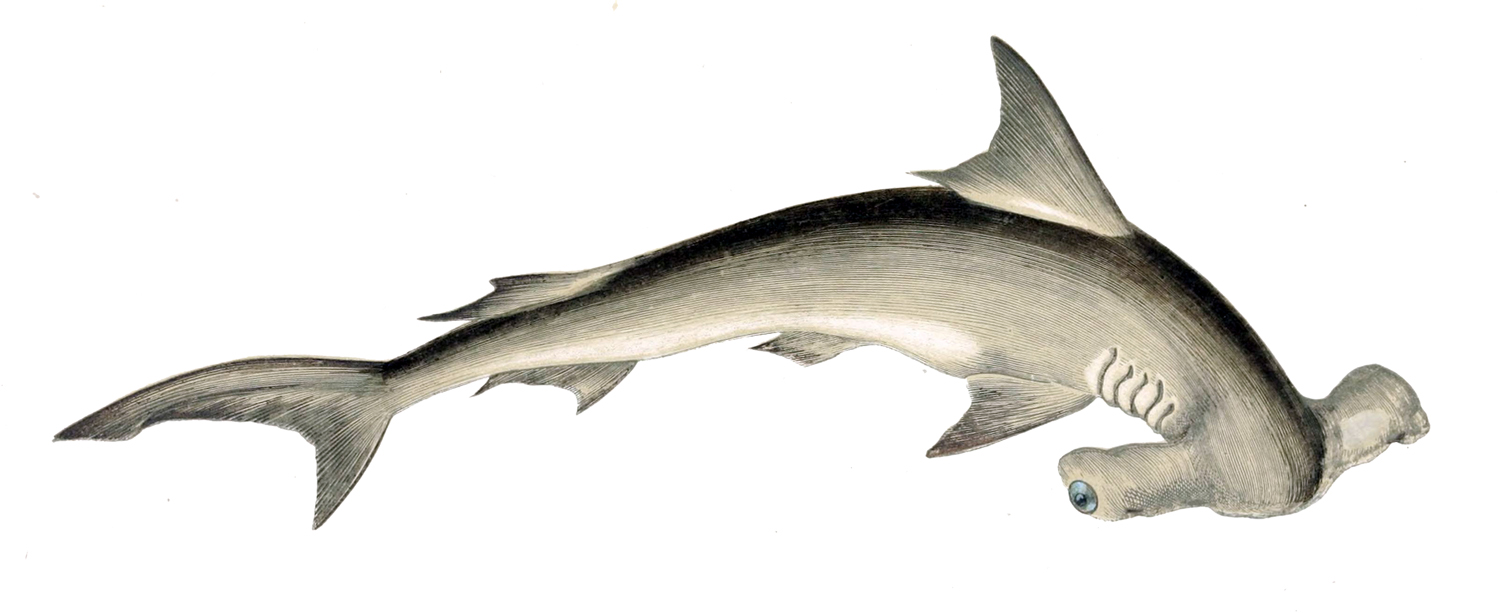

Conservation status
- Critically Endangered (IUCN 3.1)
- CITES Appendix II

Scientific classification
- Kingdom: Animalia
- Phylum: Chordata
- Class: Chondrichthyes
- Subclass: Elasmobranchii
- Division: Selachii
- Order: Carcharhiniformes
- Family: Sphyrnidae
- Genus: Sphyrna
- Species: S. lewini

Binomial name
- Sphyrna lewini (E. Griffith & C. H. Smith, 1834)

Synonyms
- Sphyrna couardi Cadenat, 1951

= Scalloped hammerhead =

Species of shark

The scalloped hammerhead (Sphyrna lewini) is a species of hammerhead shark in the family Sphyrnidae. It was originally known as Zygaena lewini. The Greek word sphyrna translates into "hammer" in English, referring to the shape of this shark's head, which is its most distinguishing characteristic. The shark's eyes and nostrils are at the tips of the extensions. It is a fairly large hammerhead, but is still smaller than both the great and smooth hammerheads.

This shark is also known as the bronze, kinky-headed, or southern hammerhead. It primarily lives in warm, temperate, and tropical coastal waters all around the globe between latitudes 46°N and 36°S, down to a depth of 500 m (1,600 ft). It is the most common of all hammerheads.

== Taxonomy ==
The scalloped hammerhead was first named Zygaena lewini and then renamed Sphyrna lewini by Edward Griffith and Hamilton Smith in 1834. It has also been named Cestracion leeuwenii by Day in 1865, Zygaena erythraea by Klunzinger in 1871, Cestracion oceanica by Garman in 1913, and Sphyrna diplana by Springer in 1941. Sphyrna comes from the Greek and translates to hammer.

It is a sister species to Sphyrna gilberti, differing by the number of vertebrae. Though once considered a distinct species, McEachran and Serret synonymized Sphyrna couardi with Sphyrna lewini in 1986. These sharks are classified as ground sharks in the order Carcharhiniformes.

== Description ==
The scalloped hammerhead is easily distinguished from other hammerhead sharks by the central indentation on the anterior margin of the head. There are also two indentations on either side of the central indentation, which gives the "scalloped" look. They have a very large first dorsal fin that is slightly hooked and a smaller second dorsal fin. Scalloped hammerhead sharks are typically uniform grey, grayish brown, bronze, or olive with a white underside for countershading.

Typically, males measure 1.5 to 1.8 m (4.9 to 5.9 ft) and weigh about 29 kg (64 lb) when they attain sexual maturity, whereas the larger females measure 2.5 m (8.2 ft) and weigh about 36.2 kg (80 lb) at sexual maturity. The maximum length of the scalloped hammerhead is 4.3 m (14 ft) and the maximum weight is 152.4 kg (336 lb), per FishBase. A female caught off Miami was found to have measured 3.26 m (10.7 ft) and reportedly weighed 200 kg (440 lb), though was in a gravid state then.

These sharks have a very high metabolic rate, which governs behavior in acquiring food. They occupy tertiary trophic levels. The scalloped hammerhead shark, like many other species, uses the shore as a breeding ground. Due to high metabolic rates, young scalloped hammerhead sharks need a lot of food, or they will starve.

S. lewini is also noted for its large and complex brain, with high levels of cognitive capabilities, social intelligence, sensorimotor functions, intricate migrations, complex habitat relationships, and athletic capture of prey. Their social intelligence is especially important for their aggregative behavior, allowing the species to reproduce with the fittest members and more easily proliferate the species.

The dentition of these sharks consists of small, narrow, triangular teeth that have smooth edges, except in larger fish, which may have somewhat serrated teeth. The teeth in the front of the mouth have erect cusps, and the teeth in the bottom jaw have cusps that are more erect than those of the upper jaw.

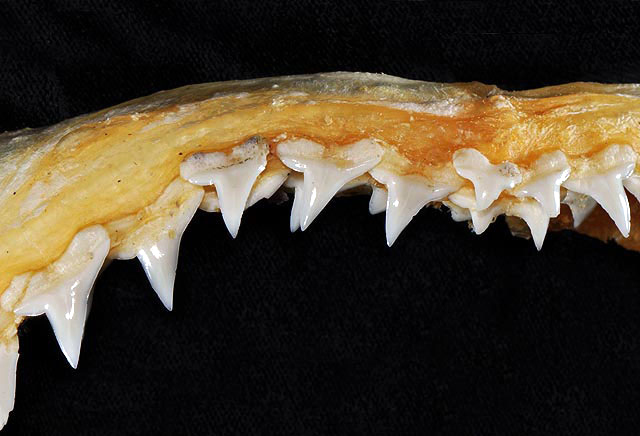
Upper teeth

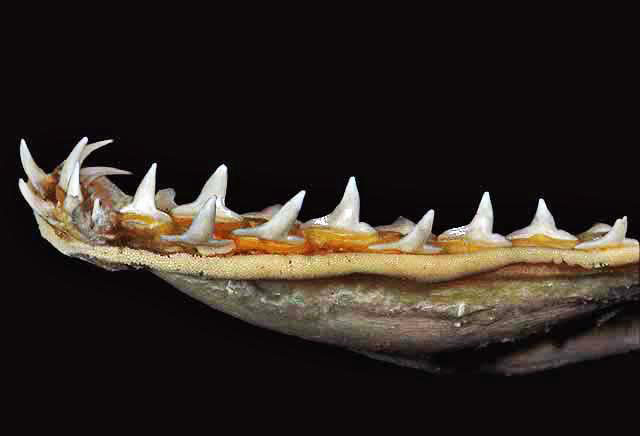
Lower teeth

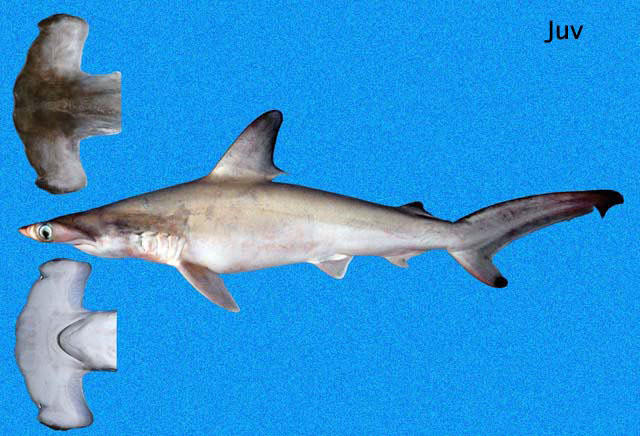
Juvenile

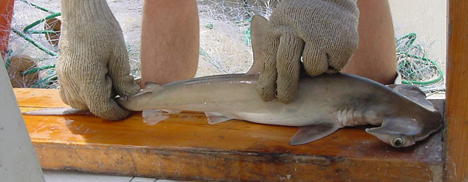
Juvenile

== Distribution and habitat ==
Scalloped hammerhead swimming (video)

The scalloped hammerhead is a coastal pelagic species; it occurs over continental and insular shelves and in nearby deeper water. It is found in warm temperate and tropical waters, worldwide from 46°N to 36°S. It can be found down to depths over 500 m (1,600 ft), but is most often found above 25 m (82 ft). During the day, they are more often found close to shore, and at night, they hunt further offshore. Adults are found alone, in pairs, or in small schools, while young sharks occur in larger schools.

Juveniles and pups thrive in shallow coastal waters, such as bays and mangroves, which provide shelter from predators and waters high in nutrients from deposited sediments. Research carried out by the nongovernmental organization Misión Tiburón, using conventional and acoustic shark tagging methods, found that adult scalloped hammerheads migrate from the pelagic waters surrounding Cocos Island to the mangroves in the tropical fjord of Golfo Dulce - a tropical fjord on the Pacific Coast of Costa Rica. Here, female sharks give birth to live young; juveniles remain in the shallow root system of the mangroves for around three years. After this time they leave Golfo Dulce and migrate back to Cocos Island, to feed in pelagic waters.

== Behavior ==
=== Schooling ===
These sharks are often seen during the night, day, and morning in big schools, sometimes numbering hundreds, most likely because large groups can obtain food more easily than singles or small groups, especially larger and trickier prey, as commonly seen. The younger the sharks, the closer to the surface they tend to be, while the adults are found much deeper in the ocean. They are not considered dangerous and are normally not aggressive towards humans.

=== Sexual dimorphism ===
The female scalloped hammerheads migrate offshore at a smaller size than males because the larger classes of the hammerhead, such as those from 100 to 140 centimetres (39 to 55 in) long, travel deeper down. Males and females differ in that males are observed to stay deeper than female sharks in general.

Sexual maturity generally occurs once the scalloped hammerhead attains 240 centimetres (7.9 ft) in total or longer. Physically, the mature females have considerably wider uteri than their maturing counterparts. A lack of mating scars has been found on mature females. Unlike females, males reach sexual maturity at a much smaller size.

The male-to-female ratio of the scalloped hammerhead is 1:1.29. Females probably are capable of giving birth annually, usually in the summer.

=== Navigation ===
Scalloped hammerhead sharks have a homing behavior to navigate in the ocean. They move in the night and use the environment as a map, similar to a human reading a topographical map. By experimentation in tagging these sharks, one could test for any guidance in a shark's movement. These sharks use a point-to-point type of school swimming, and do not favor going too deep, where temperature changes hitchhike with current speed and directional change.

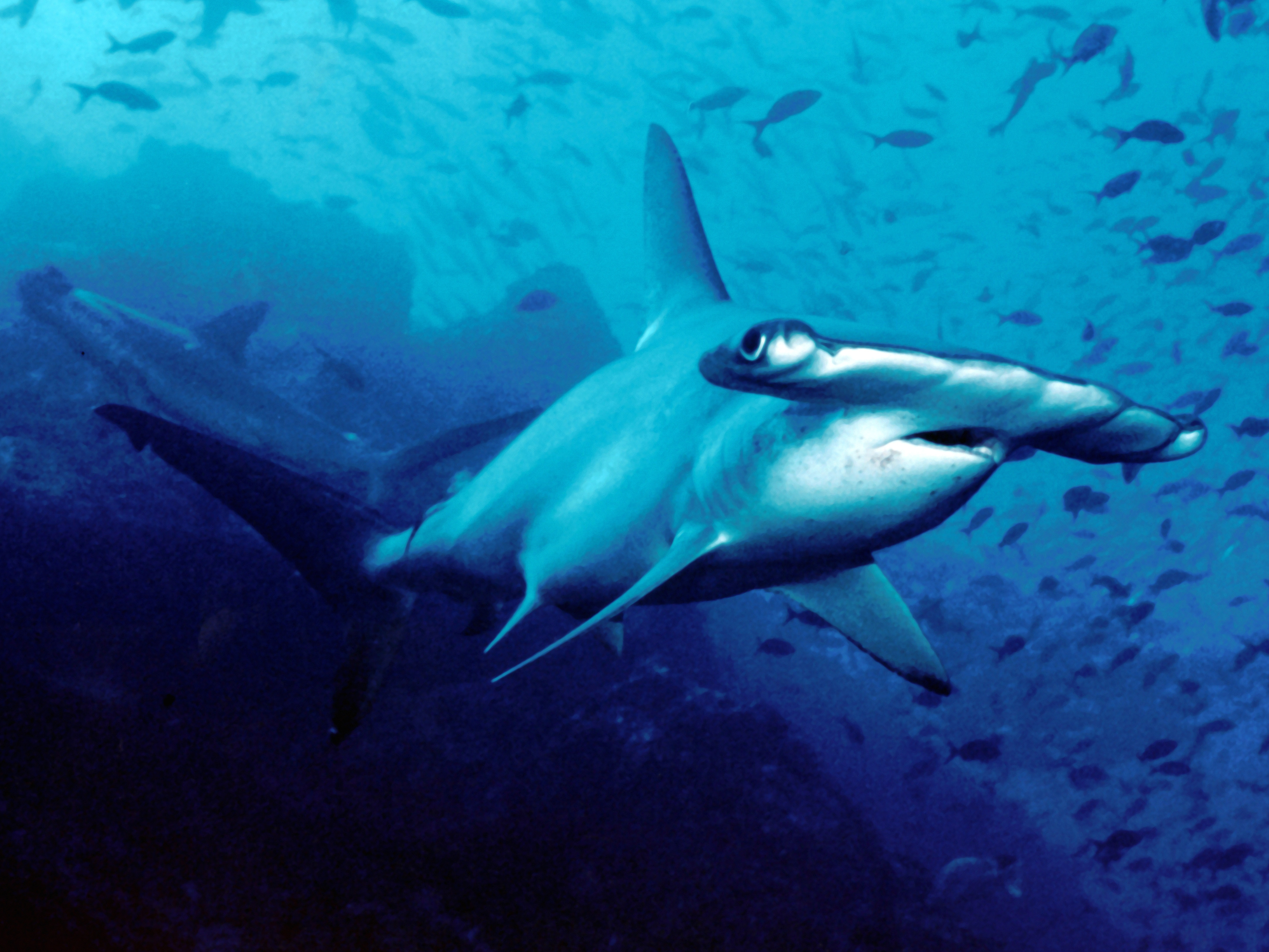

The scalloped hammerhead uses deep water to survive as safety and feeding. Although they have high metabolic rates, they have a tendency to be sedentary and allow currents to carry them as they swim. As a result, this causes scalloped hammerheads to be selective where they swim and the depth at which they tend to stay. They also make use of Earth's magnetic field.

=== Predation ===
The scalloped hammerhead has several advantages to capture its prey. The shape of its head allows it to burrow into the seafloor and pin stingrays down, while the wide head and special sensory cells allow the scalloped hammerhead to successfully detect fish.

== Reproduction ==
The gestation period is reported to be around 12 months. Scalloped hammerheads give live birth. Compared to other species, the scalloped hammerhead produces large litters (12–41 pups), and this is most likely due to high infant mortality. Like most sharks, parental care is not seen. Nursery grounds for this species are predictable and repeated over the years, and they are faithful to their natal sites. Their natal sites still cause high infant mortality; a lack of resources prevents all the young from surviving. As a result, only the fittest grow to maturity. Also, should a population get depleted, it recovers through reproduction and not immigration. This species does not seem to attack each other even in periods of starvation. In addition, scalloped hammerheads have migratory behaviors. As a result, deprivation results from migration and young growth. While the Taiwan scalloped hammerhead seems to have an earlier maturity rate, it is still reported to be slow to mature.

== Diet ==
Scalloped hammerheads are generalists and opportunistic predators, eating whatever is available and abundant in their area. There is no difference in what male and female sharks eat, but larger sharks are noted to eat larger prey than smaller, juvenile hammerheads. Juveniles typically feed on inshore fish, while adults feed on inshore fish as well as larger organisms that live in deeper waters.

Specifically, this shark feeds primarily on bony fish such as sardines, mackerel, and herring, and occasionally they feed on cephalopods such as squid, octopus, and cuttlefish, and crustaceans such as lobsters, shrimps, and crabs. Larger specimens may also feed on smaller species of shark, such as the blacktip reef shark, Carcharhinus melanopterus, and rays. Hammerheads located in the Indo-West Pacific have been observed to prey on sea snakes.

== Conservation ==
The scalloped hammerhead was the first shark species to be protected under the U.S. Endangered Species Act. As of 2019, the scalloped hammerhead has been categorized as Critically Endangered by the IUCN Red List. The IUCN cites overfishing as the main cause for the drop in population numbers. These sharks are slow growing, mature late, and have low fecundity, which makes them very vulnerable to fishing. Scalloped hammerheads are over harvested for their large sizes and fins that have 'high fin needle content;' their fins are sold for US $100–120 per kilogram. Many conservation efforts have been taken to protect this species, such as using genetic information from fins purchased from a Hong Kong market to pinpoint where scalloped hammerheads are being caught and track their exploitation levels. Another important effort has been protecting Sphyrna lewini nurseries. Scalloped hammerheads return to their birthplace to have their own pups; the pups will then spend their first years of life in these coastal nursery areas where they are safe from predators and have less competition for feeding before they venture into the open ocean. Fishing bans have been placed on some of these areas, such as in the Western Yucatan Peninsula, during breeding seasons to protect the young and juvenile scalloped hammerheads.

In many areas, officials have implemented management regulations on fishing vessels. They have made a regulation that prohibits taking the sharks onboard to transship, sell, or store for future selling. This not only protects the scalloped hammerhead shark, but also the entire order of Carcharhiniformes. Hammerhead sharks are not only being intentionally caught, but also being caught non-intentionally on longlines and nets. Bycatch has also greatly reduced these species because they often migrate in large groups. This allows the fisheries to catch many sharks at once. The mortality rate of the sharks that are caught is almost always 90% of the individuals. Even though it is hard to prevent these sharks from biting the bait or getting in the net, there has been devices put in place for bycatch reduction. Along the Eastern Atlantic, regulations have been implemented to control the over exploitation of the scalloped hammerhead. The team in this area has concluded this species is at high risk of extinction now and for the future. It is essential to understand the movement patterns of these sharks to be able to place effective conservation and management efforts.

Marine reserves have been implemented in many areas to allow the sharks to recover. It is very important to place these reserves over areas that sharks use as breeding grounds and nurseries, so they have somewhere to raise their pups. It is also beneficial to place the marine reserves in areas where they are prized as a non consumptive resource through shark diving tourism.

In parts of the Atlantic Ocean, their populations had declined by over 95% in the past 30 years. Among the reasons for this drop are overfishing and the rise in demand for shark fins. Researchers attribute this growth in demand to the increase in shark fins as an expensive delicacy (such as in shark fin soup) and in 2008 called for a ban on shark finning, a practice in which the shark's fins are cut off and the rest of the animal is thrown back in the water to die. Hammerheads are among the most commonly caught sharks for finning. "This species tendency to aggregate in large groups making capture in large numbers on long lines, bottom nets and trawls even easier."

Hammerhead sharks are overfished all around the world for their fins and liver oil. As of 2020 an estimated 1.3 to 2.7 million fins are collected each year from smooth and scalloped hammerhead sharks for the shark-fin trade. DNA barcoding can assist in the identification of scalloped hammerhead remains to aid conservation efforts.

According to a January 2021 study in Nature which studied 31 species of sharks and rays, the number of these species found in open oceans had dropped by 71 per cent in around 50 years. The scalloped hammerhead was included in the study.

== See also ==
- List of sharks
