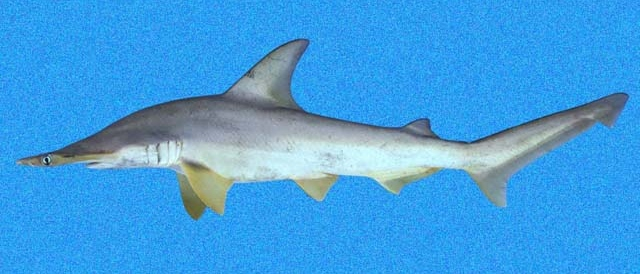

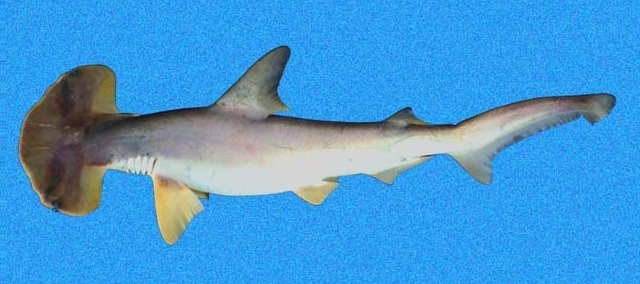

Conservation status
- Critically Endangered (IUCN 3.1)
- CITES Appendix II

Scientific classification
- Kingdom: Animalia
- Phylum: Chordata
- Class: Chondrichthyes
- Subclass: Elasmobranchii
- Division: Selachii
- Order: Carcharhiniformes
- Family: Sphyrnidae
- Genus: Sphyrna
- Species: S. corona

Binomial name
- Sphyrna corona S. Springer, 1940
- Range of the scalloped bonnethead

= Scalloped bonnethead =

Species of shark

The scalloped bonnethead (Sphyrna corona) is a rare, little-known species of hammerhead shark in the family Sphyrnidae. Its other common names include the mallethead shark and the crown shark. It is found in tropical and subtropical waters in the eastern Pacific Ocean, from Mexico to Peru, and possibly as far north as the Gulf of California. It frequents inshore habitats over soft bottoms (mud, sand, and gravel) to a depth of 100 m, and also enters mangroves and estuaries.

Probably the smallest species of hammerhead shark, the scalloped bonnethead measures up to 92 centimetres (36 in) long. Its mallet-shaped head, called a cephalofoil, is moderately wide (24–29% of total length) and elongated lengthwise. The front margin is broadly arched, with shallow lateral and medial indentations, and no prenarial grooves. The mouth is small and strongly arched. The anal fin is long and has a nearly straight rear margin. Its coloration is gray above and white below, with no prominent fin markings. The similar scoophead (S. media) can be distinguished by a shorter snout, a broader mouth, and a deeply concave anal fin margin.

Like other hammerheads, the scalloped bonnethead is viviparous, with presumably two pups per litter. The young are born at 23 centimetres (9.1 in) or above; an adolescent male has been recorded at 51 centimetres (20 in) long, and an adult at 67 centimetres (26 in). It may be taken by local inshore fisheries, but data is lacking. It feeds on or near the bottom, on crabs, shrimp, gastropods, bivalves, octopus, squid, cuttlefish, starfish, sea cucumbers, sea urchins, and bony fishes.

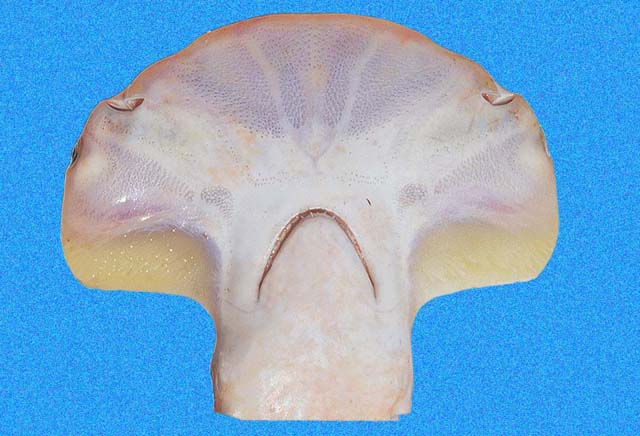
Head, underside

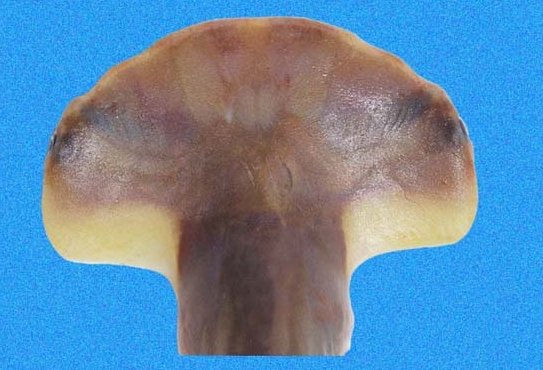
Head, top side

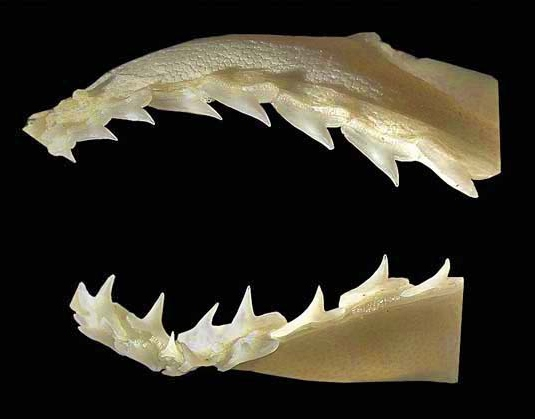
Jaws
