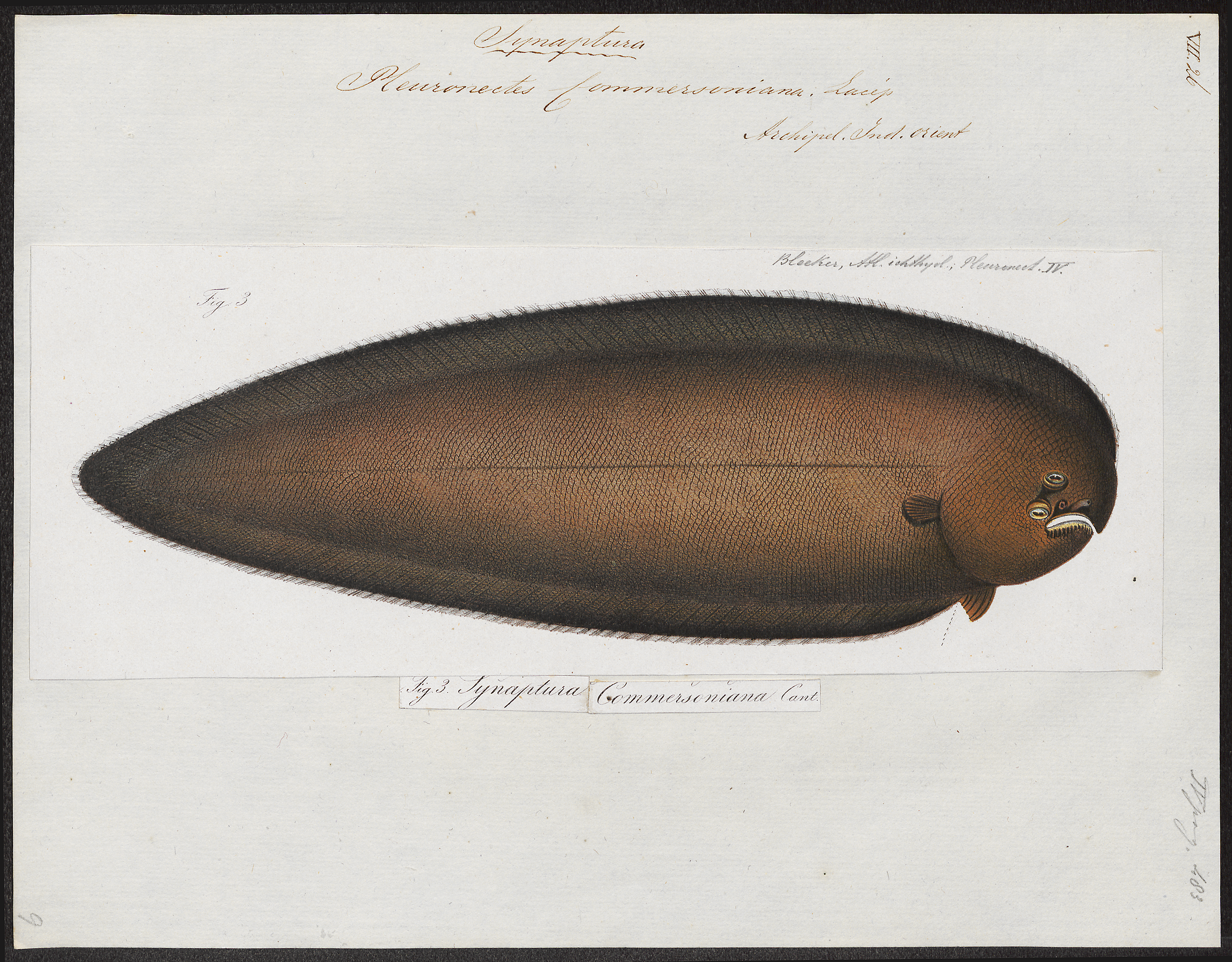
- Synaptura commersoniana

Scientific classification
- Kingdom: Animalia
- Phylum: Chordata
- Class: Actinopterygii
- Order: Carangiformes
- Suborder: Pleuronectoidei
- Family: Soleidae
- Genus: Synaptura; Cantor, 1849

Type species
- Pleuronectes orientalis see text Swainson, 1839

= Synaptura =

Genus of fishes

Synaptura is a genus of soles. Most species are found in salt and brackish water in the Indo-Pacific and tropical East Atlantic, but S. salinarum is restricted to fresh water in Australia. The largest species in the genus reaches a length of 50 cm (20 in).

Paul Chabanaud retained the genus named Synaptura for this group and he designated Pleuronectes commersonnii as its type species. This designation is incorrect according to the International Code of Zoological Nomenclature and Synaptura as designated by Theodore Edward Cantor is a synonym of Brachirus. Due to this some workers have assigned the species previously assigned to Synaptura, as raised by Chabanaud to Dagetichthys, a previously monotypic genus which contained just Dagetichthys lakdoensis. This more broadly defined Dagetichthys for a monophyletic clade. Buglossidium luteum seems to be the most closely related taxon to Dagetichthys.

== Species ==
There are currently five recognized species in this genus:

- Synaptura albomaculata Kaup, 1858 (Kaup's sole)
- Synaptura cadenati Chabanaud, 1948 (Guinean sole)
- Synaptura commersonnii (Lacépède, 1802) (Commerson's sole)
- Synaptura megalepidoura (Fowler, 1934)
- Synaptura salinarum (J. D. Ogilby, 1910) (Saltpan sole)
