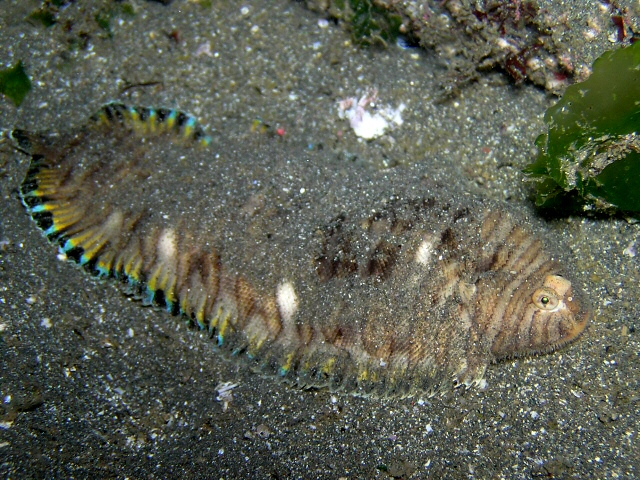

Conservation status
- Least Concern (IUCN 3.1)

Scientific classification
- Kingdom: Animalia
- Phylum: Chordata
- Class: Actinopterygii
- Division: Teleostei
- Order: Carangiformes
- Suborder: Pleuronectoidei
- Family: Soleidae
- Genus: Zebrias
- Species: Z. japonicus

Binomial name
- Zebrias japonicus (Bleeker, 1860)

Synonyms
- Aesopia japonica Bleeker, 1860; Pseudaesopia japonica (Bleeker, 1860); Synaptura smithii Regan, 1903

= Zebrias japonicus =

Species of fish

Zebrias japonicus, the wavyband sole or Seto sole, is a species of sole native to the western Pacific Ocean, where found over sandy mud bottoms. This species grows to a length of 15 centimetres (5.9 in) SL.

== See also ==
- Aesopia and Pseudaesopia: Two related genera with a similar striped pattern
