= Pseudaesopia =

Scientific classification
- Kingdom: Animalia
- Phylum: Chordata
- Class: Actinopterygii
- Order: Carangiformes
- Suborder: Pleuronectoidei
- Family: Soleidae
- Genus: Pseudaesopia; Chabanaud, 1934

Synonyms
- Zebrias (Pseudaesopia)

Genus of fishes

Pseudaesopia is a genus of flatfish in the family Soleidae, native to the Pacific Ocean

The name alludes to ψεύδης, pronounced pseúdēs meaning "false" and Aesopia.

== Species ==
There are three valid species:

- Pseudaesopia cochinensis Rama-Rao, 1967
- Pseudaesopia regani (Gilchrist, 1906)
- Pseudaesopia synapturoides (Jenkins, 1910)

=== Synonyms ===
- Pseudaesopia japonica, valid as Zebrias japonicus (Bleeker, 1860)

== See also ==
- Aesopia and Zebrias, two related genera with similar striped patterns
