= Dagetichthys lakdoensis =

Conservation status
- Least Concern (IUCN 3.1)

Scientific classification
- Kingdom: Animalia
- Phylum: Chordata
- Class: Actinopterygii
- Order: Carangiformes
- Suborder: Pleuronectoidei
- Family: Soleidae
- Genus: Dagetichthys
- Species: D. lakdoensis

Binomial name
- Dagetichthys lakdoensis Stauch & Blanc, 1964

Species of fish

Dagetichthys lakdoensis is a species of freshwater sole native to the Bénoué basin in Cameroon, with recent records from Nigeria in the Niger Delta. This species grows to a length of 40 centimetres (16 in) TL. This species is one of three known members of its genus, the others being the marine Dagetichthys lusitanicus and Dagetichthys marginatus (Boulenger, 1900)
