= Heteromycteris proboscideus =

Conservation status
- Data Deficient (IUCN 3.1)

Scientific classification
- Domain: Eukaryota
- Kingdom: Animalia
- Phylum: Chordata
- Class: Actinopterygii
- Order: Carangiformes
- Suborder: Pleuronectoidei
- Family: Soleidae
- Genus: Heteromycteris
- Species: H. proboscideus

Binomial name
- Heteromycteris proboscideus Chabanaud, 1925

Species of flatfish

Heteromycteris proboscideus, the true sole, is a species of ray-finned fish in the family Soleidae. It is found in the Southeast Atlantic Ocean near Mauritania to south of Angola. The scientific name of the species was first validly published in 1925 by Paul Chabanaud.
