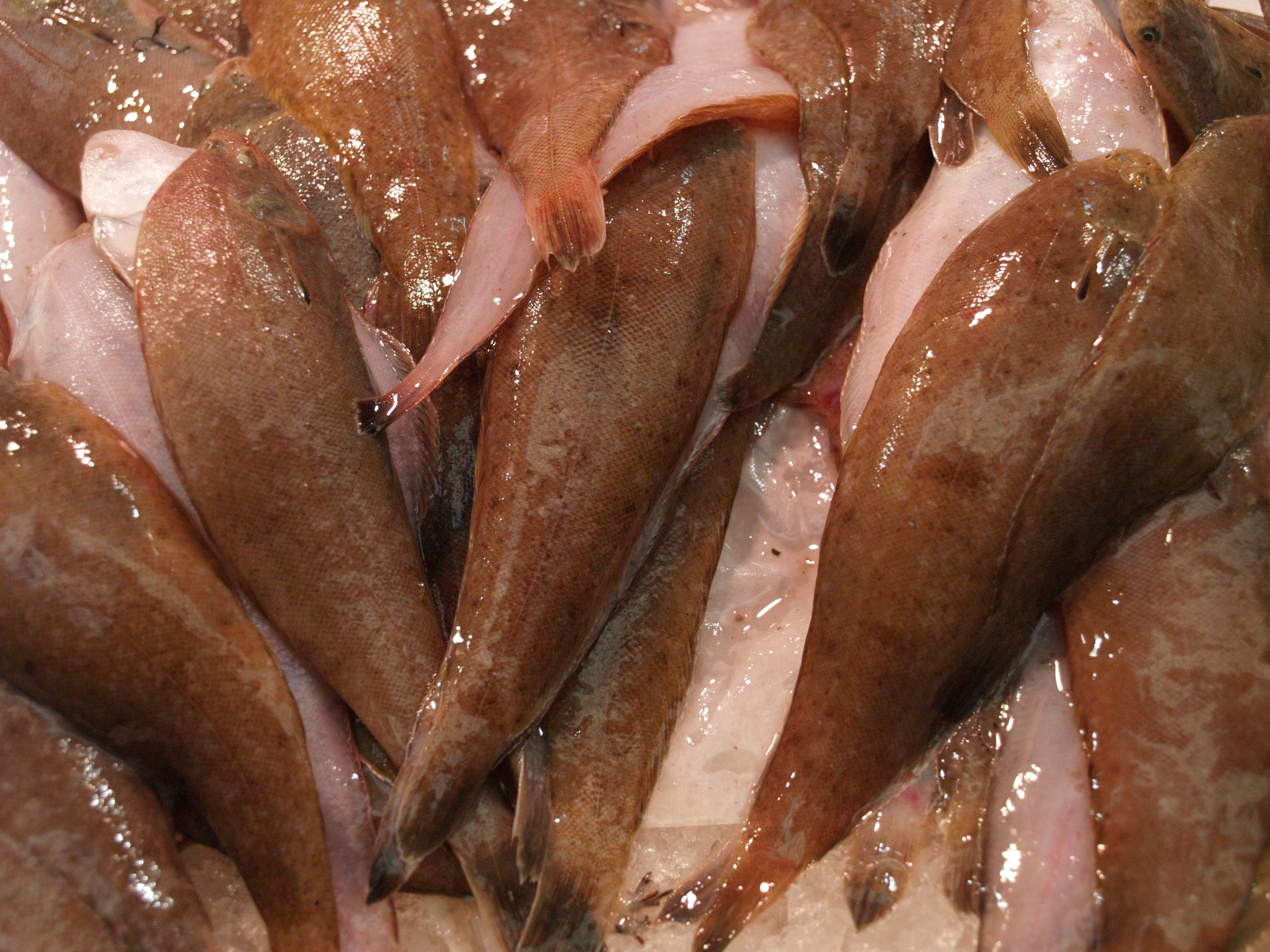

Conservation status
- Least Concern (IUCN 3.1)

Scientific classification
- Kingdom: Animalia
- Phylum: Chordata
- Class: Actinopterygii
- Division: Teleostei
- Order: Carangiformes
- Suborder: Pleuronectoidei
- Family: Soleidae
- Genus: Dicologlossa
- Species: D. cuneata

Binomial name
- Dicologlossa cuneata (É. Moreau, 1881)

Synonyms
- Solea cuneata Moreau, 1881; Pleuronectes angulatus Guichenot, 1850; Solea cleverleyi Gilchrist, 1906

= Wedge sole =

Species of fish

The wedge sole (Dicologlossa cuneata), is a flatfish of the family Soleidae. It is a bottom dwelling predatory fish inhabiting both sandy and muddy soils at depths between 10 and 450 m (30 and 1,480 ft) in the East Atlantic and Mediterranean Sea. It achieves a maximum size of 30 cm (12 in).

== Morphology ==
Wedge soles are a flatfish having a maximum size of 30 cm (12 in). Several characteristics permit their distinction from other Soleidae, notably the juveniles of other species with which it is sometimes confused.

Its body is more elongated than most other species of the Soleidae family, with scales that detach more easily than the common sole. The upper face is a chocolate brown and carries characteristic blueish marks. On this side, the pectoral fin has a black mark which doesn't extend to the end, contrary to other soles. This fin has a marked triangular shape. The angular snout covers a little of the lower jaw. Another feature is that the lateral line is formed of between 105 and 132 tubular scales, compared to between 116 and 163 for the common sole. Additionally, this line showed a marked curve towards the head in the supratemporal area, while it is more gently curved in Solea solea.

Other anatomical differences between the species are the position of the migratory eye, (Note: In flatfish, the "migratory eye" is the one that migrates to join the other eye on the same side of the head.) the shape of the urohyal and the number of vertebrae; Dicologlossa cuneata has 43–45 vertebrae, compared to 49–52 for Solea solea.

== Distribution and population ==
The wedge sole occurs in the eastern Atlantic from the Bay of Biscay south to Cape of Good Hope, including the Canary Islands and the Cape Verde Islands. It also extends into the western Mediterranean Sea along the coast of Spain to Málaga and on the coasts of Morocco and Algeria. There have also been records from Syria in 2014.

The population in the northern part of its range is increasing, this may be due to the increasing temperatures of these waters caused by climate change.

== Habitat and ecology ==
The wedge sole is found on sandy or sand-mud bottoms at depths of 15 - 40m, although it has been found at depths of 115m along the inner shelf of the Gulf of Cadiz and at 400m off Mauritania. It is a predator of crustaceans, polychaetes and bivalves. The spawning season is extended starting in the autumn and continues through the winter until early summer. The eggs are pelagic and non-adhesive., although this varies geographically; running from May to September in the Bay of Bisccay and in late Autumn and Winter in the Mediterranean. Females reach sexual maturity at a total length of 18 cm (7.1 in), males at 15 cm (5.9 in).

== Fishing and eating ==
The legal minimum size for capture of the wedge sole in European waters is 17 cm (6.7 in). They are typically caught more in the colder months of the year. The flesh is white, delicate and low in fat. The bones are not difficult to remove when eating.

In France, the wedge sole is a speciality of the fishing ports of Cotinière, on the île d'Oléron, and Royan, in Charente-Maritime.

It is widely eaten in Andalusia, where it is generally fried. Common fishing zones are in the southern Atlantic due to the fish's preference for a subtropical climate, but it is also found in the Mediterranean. The mouth of the Guadalquivir river in southern Spain is an important habitat for the species; the predominant Spanish landing port being Sanlúcar de Barrameda. The annual catch is 976 tonnes.
