= Bathysolea =

Scientific classification
- Kingdom: Animalia
- Phylum: Chordata
- Class: Actinopterygii
- Order: Carangiformes
- Suborder: Pleuronectoidei
- Family: Soleidae
- Genus: Bathysolea; Roule, 1916

Genus of fishes

Bathysolea is a genus of soles native to the eastern Atlantic and western Indian oceans.

== Species ==
There are currently four recognized species in this genus:

- Bathysolea lactea Roule, 1916
- Bathysolea lagarderae Quéro & Desoutter, 1990
- Bathysolea polli (Chabanaud, 1950)
- Bathysolea profundicola (Vaillant, 1888) (Deepwater sole)
