= Barnardichthys =

Scientific classification
- Kingdom: Animalia
- Phylum: Chordata
- Class: Actinopterygii
- Order: Carangiformes
- Suborder: Pleuronectoidei
- Family: Soleidae
- Genus: Barnardichthys; Chabanaud, 1927
- Species: B. fulvomarginata

Binomial name
- Barnardichthys fulvomarginata (Gilchrist, 1904)

Synonyms
- Solea fulvomarginata Gilchrist, 1904; Barnardichthys fulvomarginatus (Gilchrist, 1904)

Genus of fishes

Barnardichthys fulvomarginata, the lemon sole, is a species of sole endemic to the coasts of South Africa. This species is the only known member of its genus.

== Description ==
The lemon sole grows to a length of 26 cm (10 in) TL. The blind side of the head is covered in small filaments. The eyes are green. It has a pale buff or yellow body that is scattered with darker and paler spots, with a few large, dark spots along the edges of the dorsal and anal fins. Similar large spots also sometimes occur along the mid-line. The dorsal and anal fins have distinct yellow margins and are fused to a large, rounded caudal fin.

== Distribution and habitat ==
This species is endemic to South Africa, where it is found at False Bay and further to the east of the country. It is found in areas where the sea floor is made of fine sand, from near inshore areas to a depth of at least 50 m (160 ft).

== Ecology ==
This species covers itself in sand when it rests on the sea floor. It feeds on small benthic invertebrates.
