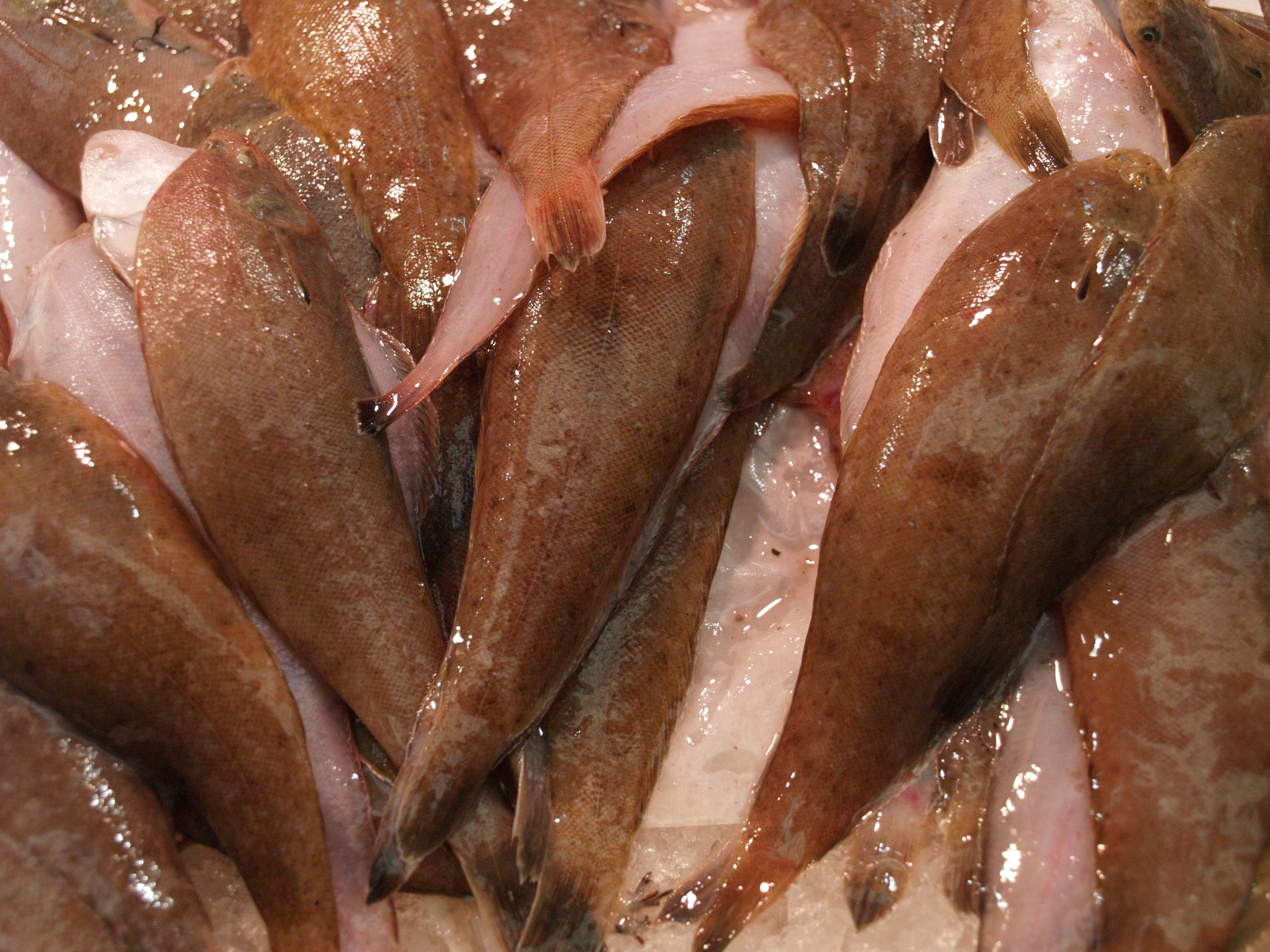
- Wedge Sole (D. cuneata)

Scientific classification
- Domain: Eukaryota
- Kingdom: Animalia
- Phylum: Chordata
- Class: Actinopterygii
- Order: Carangiformes
- Suborder: Pleuronectoidei
- Family: Soleidae
- Genus: Dicologlossa; Chabanaud, 1927

Type species
- Solea cuneata Moreau, 1881

= Dicologlossa =

Genus of fishes

Dicologlossa is a genus of soles native to the tropical and subtropical eastern Atlantic Ocean.

== Species ==
There are currently two recognized species in this genus:

- Dicologlossa cuneata (É. Moreau, 1881) (Wedge sole)
- Dicologlossa hexophthalma (E. T. Bennett, 1831) (Ocellated wedge sole)
