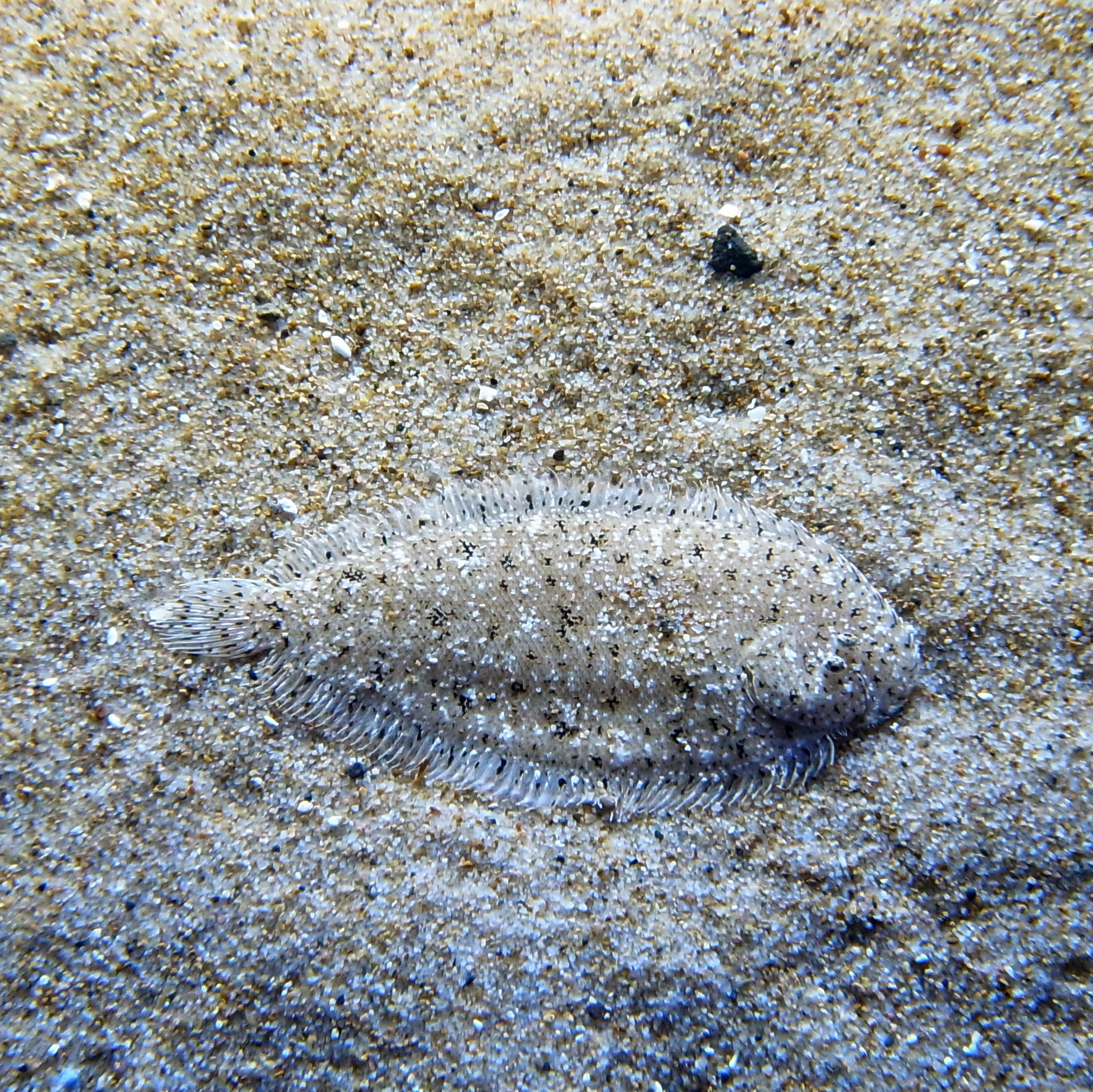

Conservation status
- Least Concern (IUCN 3.1)

Scientific classification
- Kingdom: Animalia
- Phylum: Chordata
- Class: Actinopterygii
- Division: Teleostei
- Order: Carangiformes
- Suborder: Pleuronectoidei
- Family: Soleidae
- Genus: Heteromycteris
- Species: H. japonicus

Binomial name
- Heteromycteris japonicus Temminck & Schlegel, 1846

Synonyms
- Heteromycteris japonica (Temminck & Schlegel, 1846)

= Heteromycteris japonicus =

Species of flatfish

Heteromycteris japonicus, the bamboo sole is a species of ray-finned fish in the family Soleidae. The scientific name of the species was first validly published in 1846 by Temminck & Schlegel.
