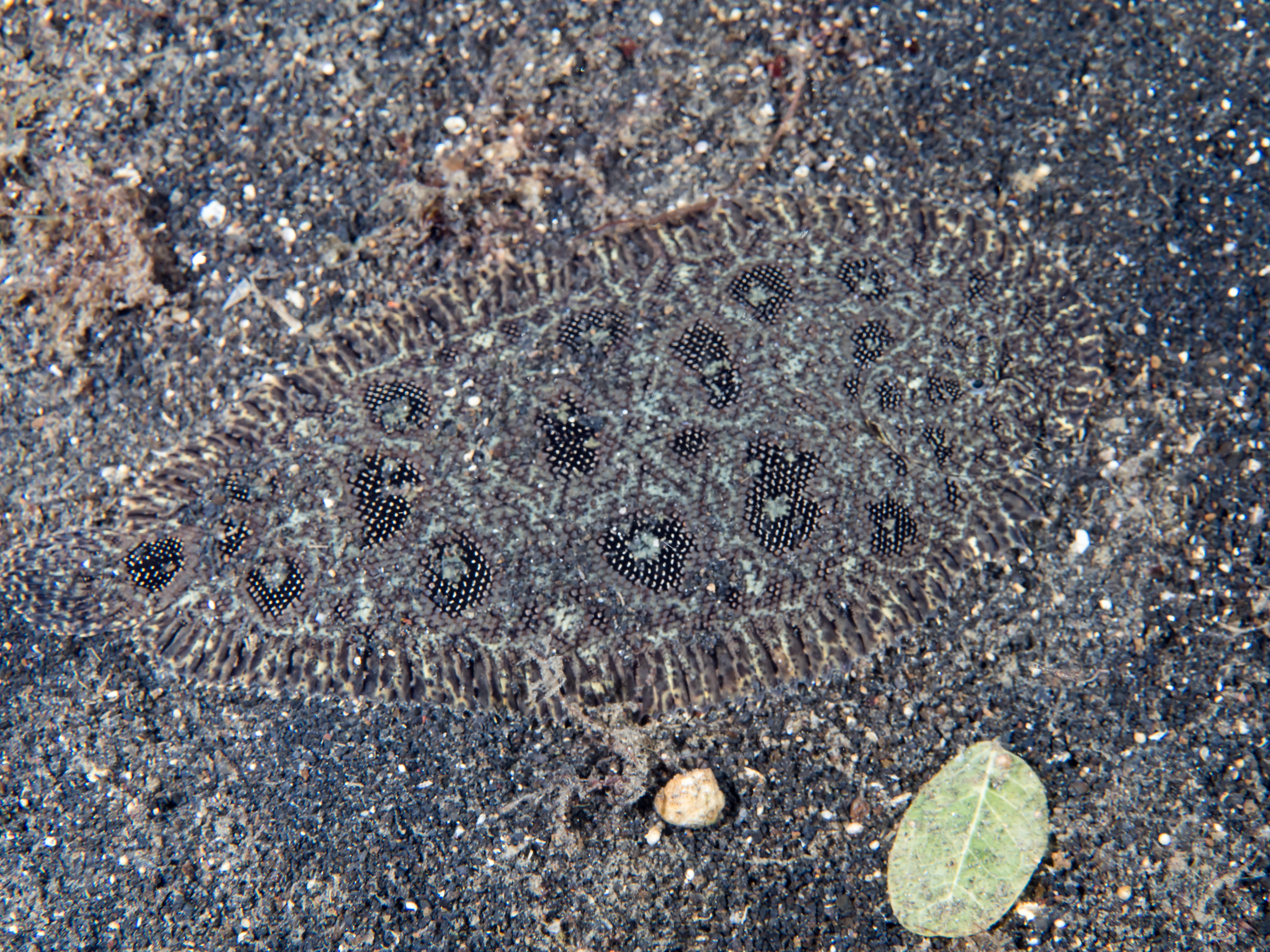

Conservation status
- Data Deficient (IUCN 3.1)

Scientific classification
- Kingdom: Animalia
- Phylum: Chordata
- Class: Actinopterygii
- Order: Carangiformes
- Suborder: Pleuronectoidei
- Family: Soleidae
- Genus: Heteromycteris
- Species: H. hartzfeldii

Binomial name
- Heteromycteris hartzfeldii Bleeker, 1853

Synonyms
- Solea hartzfeldii (Bleeker, 1853); Aseraggodes hartzfeldii (Bleeker, 1853); Liachirus hartzfeldii (Bleeker, 1853); Heteromycteris hartzfeldi (Bleeker, 1853)

= Heteromycteris hartzfeldii =

Species of flatfish

Heteromycteris hartzfeldii, the hook-nosed sole, is a species of ray-finned fish in the family Soleidae. The scientific name of the species was first validly published in 1853 by Pieter Bleeker.
