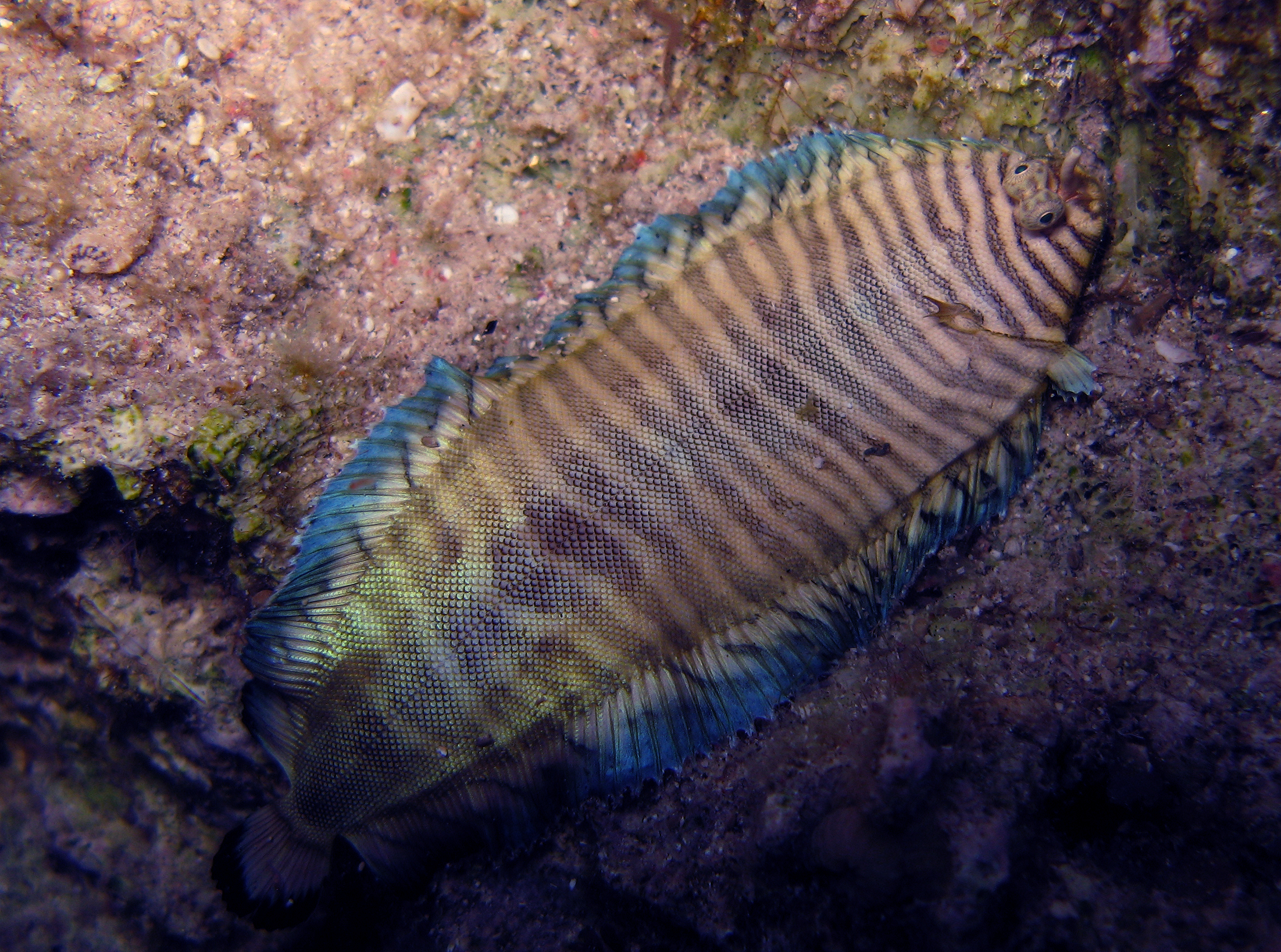
- Soleichthys heterorhinos in Egypt under normal illumination
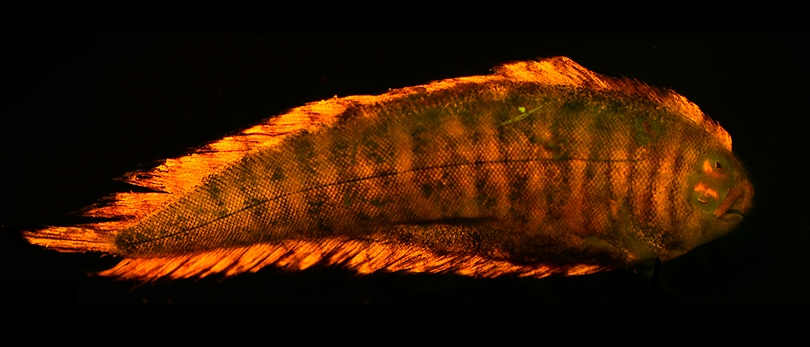
- Biofluorescence of Soleichthys heterorhinos

Conservation status
- Least Concern (IUCN 3.1)

Scientific classification
- Kingdom: Animalia
- Phylum: Chordata
- Class: Actinopterygii
- Order: Carangiformes
- Suborder: Pleuronectoidei
- Family: Soleidae
- Genus: Soleichthys
- Species: S. heterorhinos

Binomial name
- Soleichthys heterorhinos (Bleeker, 1856)

Synonyms
- Solea heterorhinos Bleeker, 1856; Aesopia heterorhina (Bleeker, 1856); Aesopia heterorhinos (Bleeker, 1856); Aesopia multifasciata Kaup, 1858; Solea nigrostriolata Steindachner & Kner, 1870; Parophrys nigrostriolata (Steindachner & Kner, 1870); Solea lineata Ramsay, 1883

= Soleichthys heterorhinos =

Species of fish

Blue edged sole (Soleichthys heterorhinos) is a sole from the Eastern Indian Ocean and Western Pacific. It occasionally makes its way into the aquarium trade. It grows to a length of 18 cm.

Soleichthys heterorhinos exhibits biofluorescence, that is, when illuminated by blue or ultraviolet light, it re-emits it as red, and appears differently than under white light illumination. Biofluorescence potentially assists intraspecific communication and camouflage.
