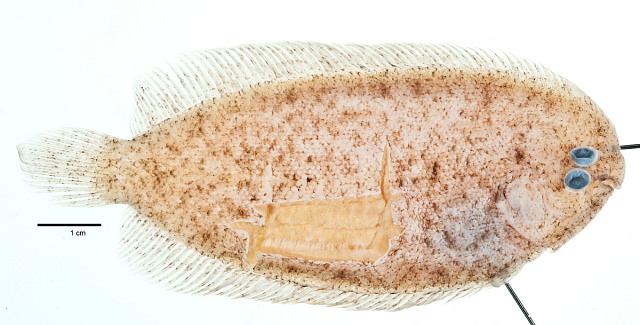

Conservation status
- Least Concern (IUCN 3.1)

Scientific classification
- Kingdom: Animalia
- Phylum: Chordata
- Class: Actinopterygii
- Order: Carangiformes
- Suborder: Pleuronectoidei
- Family: Soleidae
- Genus: Aseraggodes
- Species: A. heemstrai

Binomial name
- Aseraggodes heemstrai Randall & Gon, 2006

= Aseraggodes heemstrai =

Species of fish

Aseraggodes heemstrai is a species of fish from the genus Aseraggodes. Found in KwaZulu-Natal, South Africa, it was described on the basis of 16 specimens.
