= Vanstraelenia =

Conservation status
- Data Deficient (IUCN 3.1)

Scientific classification
- Kingdom: Animalia
- Phylum: Chordata
- Class: Actinopterygii
- Order: Carangiformes
- Suborder: Pleuronectoidei
- Family: Soleidae
- Genus: Vanstraelenia; Chabanaud, 1950
- Species: V. chirophthalma

Binomial name
- Vanstraelenia chirophthalma (Regan, 1915)

Synonyms
- Vanstraelenia insignis Chabanaud, 1950; Xenobuglossus elongatus Chabanaud, 1950

Genus of fishes

Vanstraelenia chirophthalma, the African solenette, is a species of sole native to the Atlantic coast of Africa where it is found from Guinea-Bissau south to Angola. Occurring at depths of from 8 to 100 metres (26 to 328 ft), this species is of importance to local commercial fisheries. This species grows to a length of 28 centimetres (11 in) TL. This species is the only known member of its genus.
