= Heteromycteris oculus =

Conservation status
- Data Deficient (IUCN 3.1)

Scientific classification
- Kingdom: Animalia
- Phylum: Chordata
- Class: Actinopterygii
- Order: Carangiformes
- Suborder: Pleuronectoidei
- Family: Soleidae
- Genus: Heteromycteris
- Species: H. oculus

Binomial name
- Heteromycteris oculus Alcock, 1889

Species of flatfish

Heteromycteris oculus, the eyed sole, is a species of ray-finned fish in the family Soleidae. It is found in the Indo-West Pacific. The scientific name of the species was first validly published in 1889 by Alfred William Alcock.
