= Synclidopus =

Scientific classification
- Kingdom: Animalia
- Phylum: Chordata
- Class: Actinopterygii
- Order: Carangiformes
- Suborder: Pleuronectoidei
- Family: Soleidae
- Genus: Synclidopus; Chabanaud, 1943

Type species
- Solea macleayana (Ramsay, 1881)

Genus of fishes

Synclidopus is a genus of soles. The two species have numerous narrow dark and pale stripes. Both are endemic to eastern Australia. Adults of the best-known species, S. macleayanus live at moderate depths in the ocean, but migrate towards estuaries to spawn in the spring and summer. The young make their way up the estuary and river, only to return to the sea when they grow older. Less is known about S. hogani, only described in 2008, but it appears to be restricted to the Daintree River.

== Species ==
There are currently two recognized species in this genus:

- Synclidopus hogani J. W. Johnson & J. E. Randall, 2008
- Synclidopus macleayanus (E. P. Ramsay, 1881) (Narrowbanded sole)
