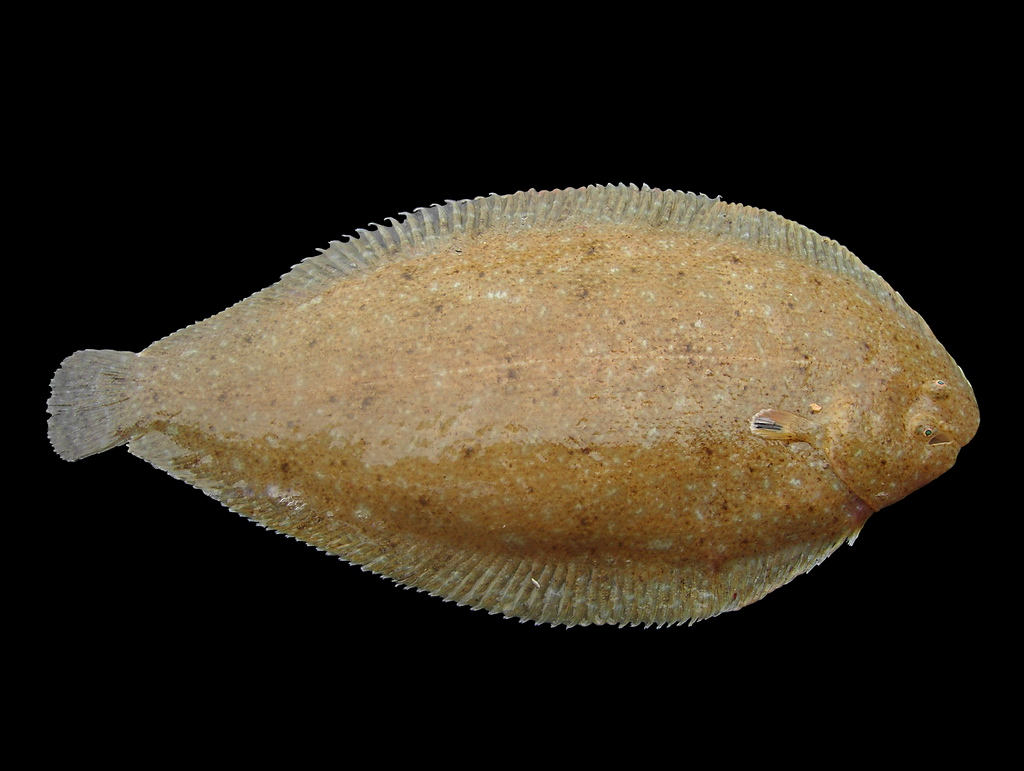

Conservation status
- Data Deficient (IUCN 3.1)

Scientific classification
- Kingdom: Animalia
- Phylum: Chordata
- Class: Actinopterygii
- Order: Carangiformes
- Suborder: Pleuronectoidei
- Family: Soleidae
- Genus: Austroglossus
- Species: A. pectoralis

Binomial name
- Austroglossus pectoralis (Kaup, 1858)

= Austroglossus pectoralis =

Species of fish

Austroglossus pectoralis, the Agulhas sole or mud sole, is a fish found from Cape Town to KwaZulu-Natal. The fish is born with normal dimensions but as soon as it gets bigger the skull bones turn so that both eyes are on the same side. The fish then swim horizontally and remain mostly on the bottom of the sea, covered with sand. The fish grows to 60 cm in size and then weighs about 1 kg.
