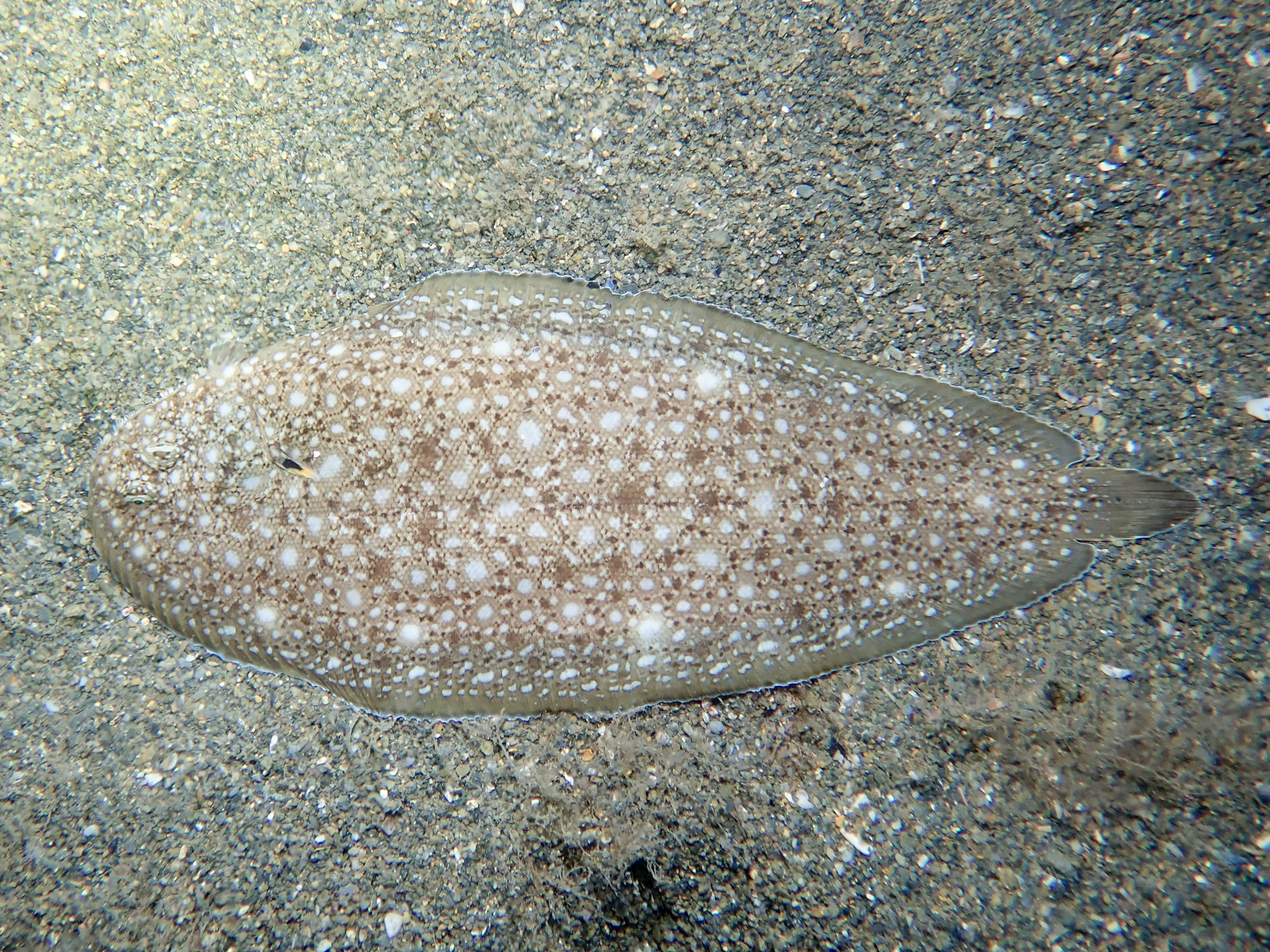

Conservation status
- Data Deficient (IUCN 3.1)

Scientific classification
- Kingdom: Animalia
- Phylum: Chordata
- Class: Actinopterygii
- Order: Carangiformes
- Suborder: Pleuronectoidei
- Family: Soleidae
- Genus: Synapturichthys; Chabanaud, 1927
- Species: S. kleinii

Binomial name
- Synapturichthys kleinii (A. Risso, 1827)

Synonyms
- Rhombus kleinii Risso, 1827; Pegusa kleinii (Risso, 1827); Solea kleinii (Risso, 1827); Synaptura kleinii (Risso, 1827); Synaptura savignyi Kaup, 1858; Solea capellonis Steindachner, 1868; Synaptura melanoptera Gilchrist, 1904; Solea melanoptera (Gilchrist, 1904); Solea alboguttata Fowler, 1929

= Synapturichthys =

Genus of fishes

Synapturichthys kleinii, Klein's sole or lace sole, is a species of economically important sole. It is the only known member of its genus.

== Description ==
This species grows to a length of 40 centimetres (16 in) TL, though most only reach around 15 centimetres (5.9 in) TL. The head is covered with filaments on the blind side (the side without the eyes), giving this fish a bearded appearance when viewed from the front. The eyes are green in colour. The body is pale brown. It is covered in large round blotches that are joined by smaller blotches. These form circles with white centers. This pattern extends onto the dorsal and anal fins. The caudal and pectoral fins are small.

== Distribution and habitat ==
This fish is found in the Mediterranean Sea and along the Atlantic coast of Africa, just barely entering the Indian Ocean in South Africa. It is found on sandy and rubble sea beds, particularly close to ship wrecks and reefs.

== Ecology ==
This fish feeds on small benthic invertebrates.
