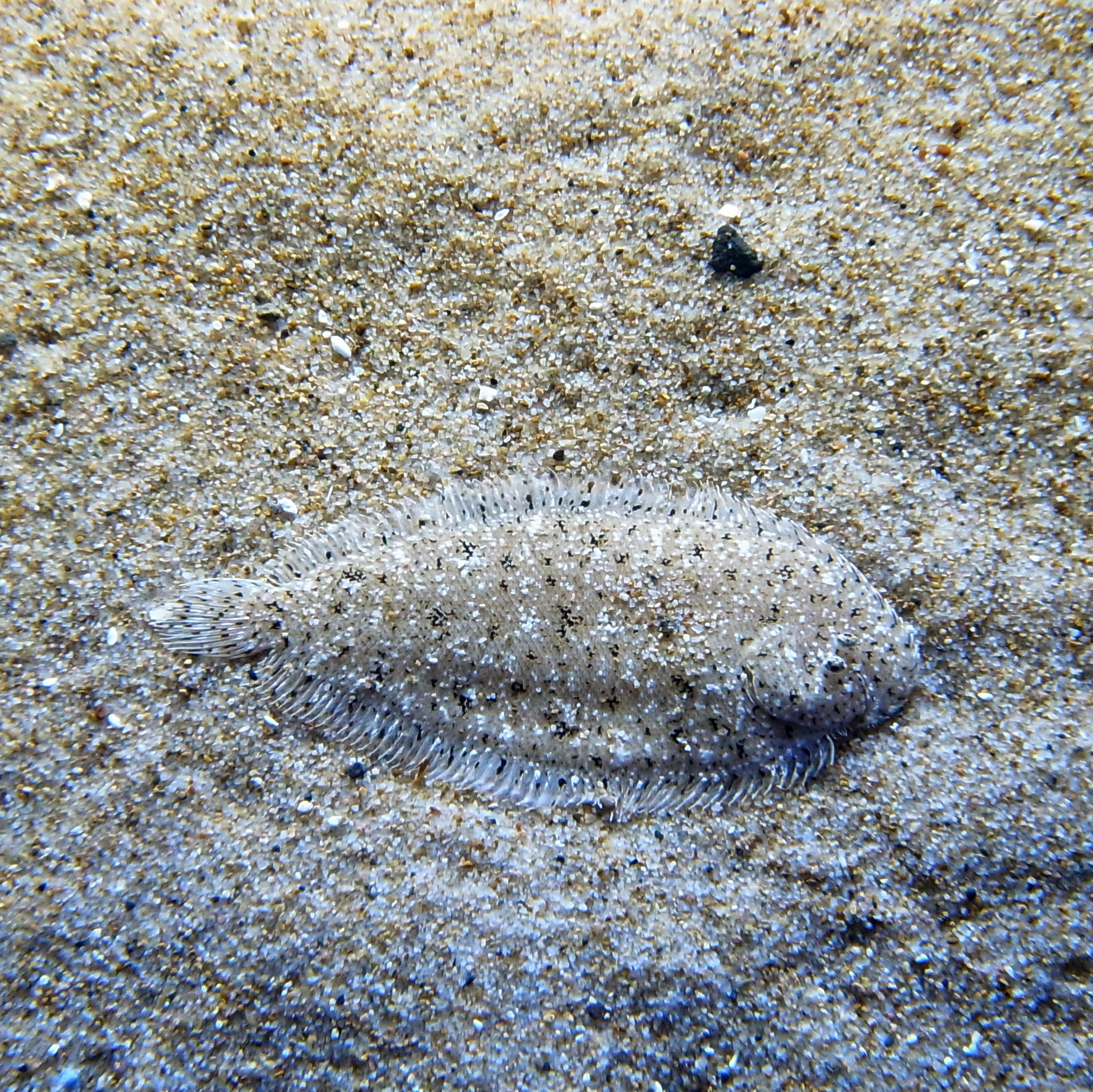
- Heteromycteris japonicus

Scientific classification
- Domain: Eukaryota
- Kingdom: Animalia
- Phylum: Chordata
- Class: Actinopterygii
- Order: Carangiformes
- Suborder: Pleuronectoidei
- Family: Soleidae
- Genus: Heteromycteris; Kaup, 1858

Type species
- Heteromycteris capensis Kaup, 1858

Synonyms
- Amate Jordan & Starks, 1906; Monodichthys Chabanaud, 1925

= Heteromycteris =

Genus of fishes

Heteromycteris is a genus of small soles found in both salt and brackish water. Most are native to the northwest Pacific, but H. hartzfeldii and H. oculus are from the Indo-Pacific, and H. capensis is from southern Africa.

== Species ==
There are currently six recognized species in this genus:

- Heteromycteris capensis Kaup, 1858 (Cape sole)
- Heteromycteris hartzfeldii (Bleeker, 1853) (Hook-nosed sole)
- Heteromycteris japonicus (Temminck & Schlegel, 1846) (Bamboo sole)
- Heteromycteris matsubarai Ochiai, 1963
- Heteromycteris oculus (Alcock, 1889) (Eyed sole)
- Heteromycteris proboscideus (Chabanaud, 1925) (True sole)
