= Feylinia =

Scientific classification
- Kingdom: Animalia
- Phylum: Chordata
- Class: Reptilia
- Order: Squamata
- Family: Scincidae
- Subfamily: Scincinae
- Genus: Feylinia; Gray, 1845

Species
- Six, see text.

Genus of lizards

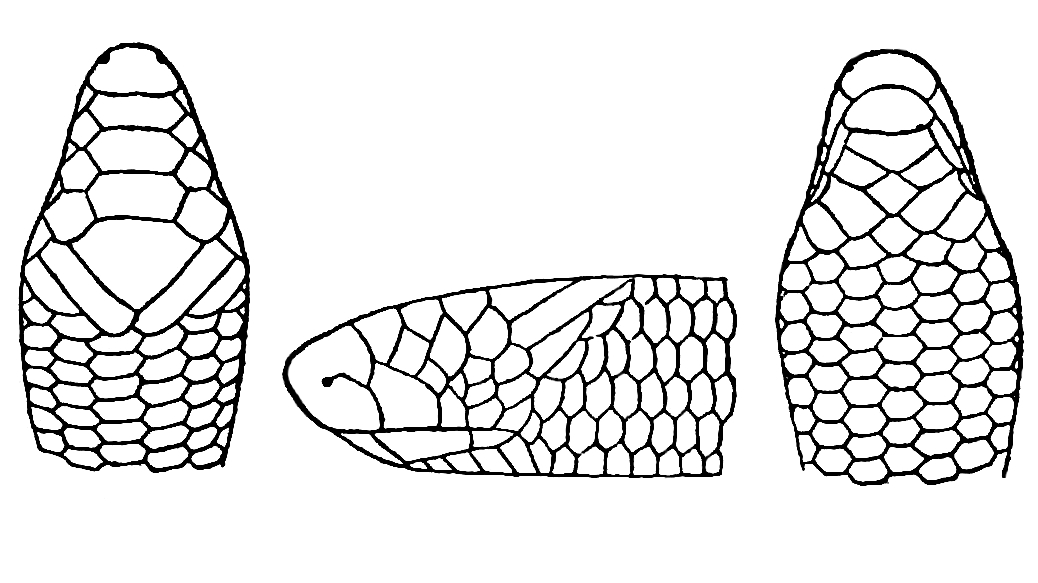
Feylinia boulengeri illustration.

Feylinia is a genus of skinks (family Scincidae). It is usually placed in the monotypic subfamily Feylininae.

However, it appears to be not as distinct as formerly presumed, but rather somewhat closer to such genera as Chalcides and Sepsina. These are usually placed in the subfamily Scincinae, which seems to be paraphyletic however.

Feylinia belongs to a major clade which does not seem to include the Scincinae type genus Scincus. Thus, it will probably be eventually assigned to a new, yet-to-be-named subfamily. (Austin & Arnold 2006)

== Species ==
The following six species are recognized.

- Feylinia boulengeri Chabanaud, 1917
- Feylinia currori Gray, 1845 - western forest feylinia
- Feylinia elegans (Hallowell, 1854) - elegant feylinia
- Feylinia grandisquamis L. Müller, 1910 - large-scaled burrowing skink
- Feylinia macrolepis Boettger, 1877
- Feylinia polylepis Bocage, 1877 - manyscaled feylinia
