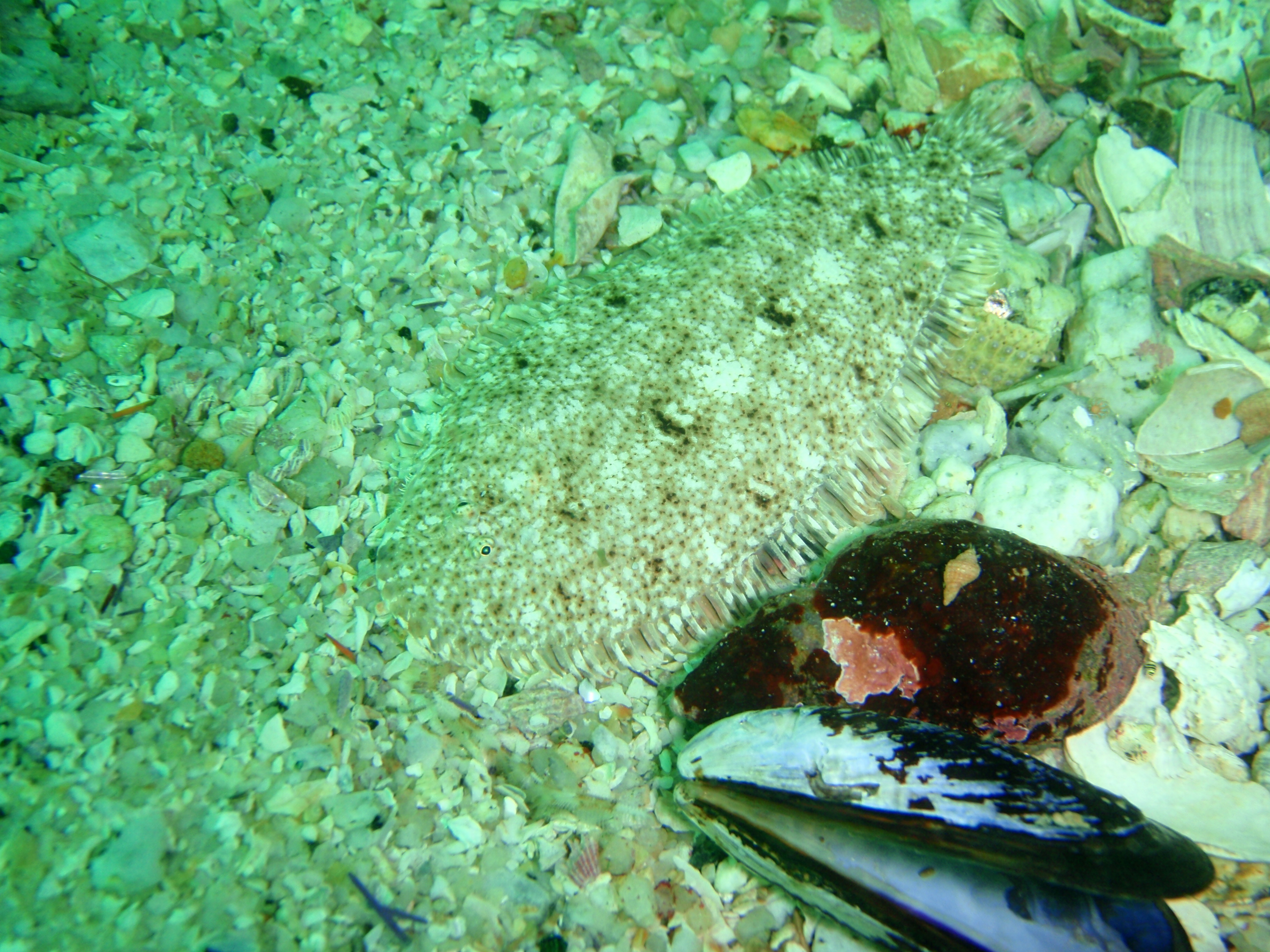

Conservation status
- Near Threatened (IUCN 3.1)

Scientific classification
- Kingdom: Animalia
- Phylum: Chordata
- Class: Actinopterygii
- Division: Teleostei
- Order: Carangiformes
- Suborder: Pleuronectoidei
- Family: Soleidae
- Genus: Heteromycteris
- Species: H. capensis

Binomial name
- Heteromycteris capensis Kaup, 1858

= Heteromycteris capensis =

Species of flatfish

Heteromycteris capensis, the Cape sole, is endemic to South Africa and occurs on the west and south coasts as far as the Transkei.

== Description ==
The fish is small and brown with dark spots. It has no pectoral fins and the dorsal and anal fins are not continuous with the caudal fin. It is a bottom dweller found in shallow sandy water. There are three dull spots on the lateral line. The fish grows to 15 cm (5.9 in). They live in shallow water and the immature fish are found in lagoons.

== Sources ==
- Gids tot die Kusgebiede van Suid-Afrika. Jacana Media. 2007. ISBN 978-1-77009-215-0
- Coastal Fishes of Southern Africa. Phil & Elaine Heemstra. 2004. ISBN 1-920033-01-7
