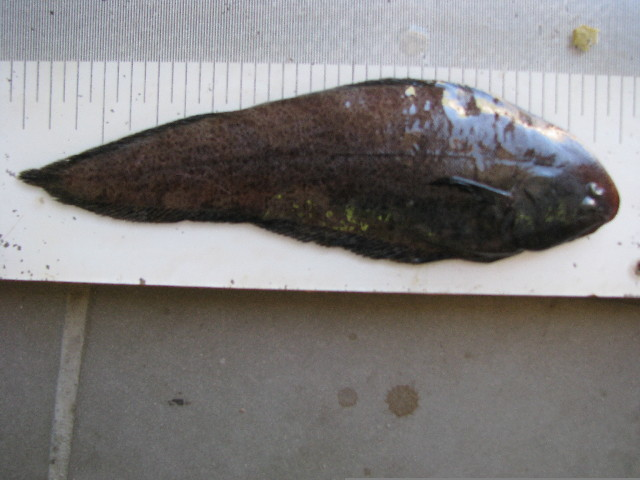

Conservation status
- Data Deficient (IUCN 3.1)

Scientific classification
- Kingdom: Animalia
- Phylum: Chordata
- Class: Actinopterygii
- Order: Carangiformes
- Suborder: Pleuronectoidei
- Family: Soleidae
- Genus: Austroglossus
- Species: A. microlepis

Binomial name
- Austroglossus microlepis (Bleeker, 1863)

= Austroglossus microlepis =

Species of fish

Austroglossus microlepis, or the West coast sole, is a sea fish that is endemic to South Africa and is found from Namibia to False Bay.
