= Zebrias zebrinus =

Scientific classification
- Kingdom: Animalia
- Phylum: Chordata
- Class: Actinopterygii
- Division: Teleostei
- Order: Carangiformes
- Suborder: Pleuronectoidei
- Family: Soleidae
- Genus: Zebrias
- Species: Z. zebrinus

Binomial name
- Zebrias zebrinus (Temminck & Schlegel, 1846)

Species of flatfish

Zebrias zebrinus is a ray-finned flatfish and member of the family Soleidae.

== Description ==
The genus has been dubbed Zebrias due to the dark and pale stripes on its body resembling a zebra. Based on observations the species can grow up to around 22 cm long but further information about this exact species is unknown.

They are asymmetrical at adulthood due to the flatfish's ability to migrate one eye to the other side of its body upon maturity, but is initially bilaterally symmetrical when young.

Studies have been committed that have successfully mapped its complete mitochondrial genome.

== Distribution ==
The species is found in subtropical marine environments, such as shallow bays and estuaries, roughly 6–20 m deep around Japan and South Korea.
