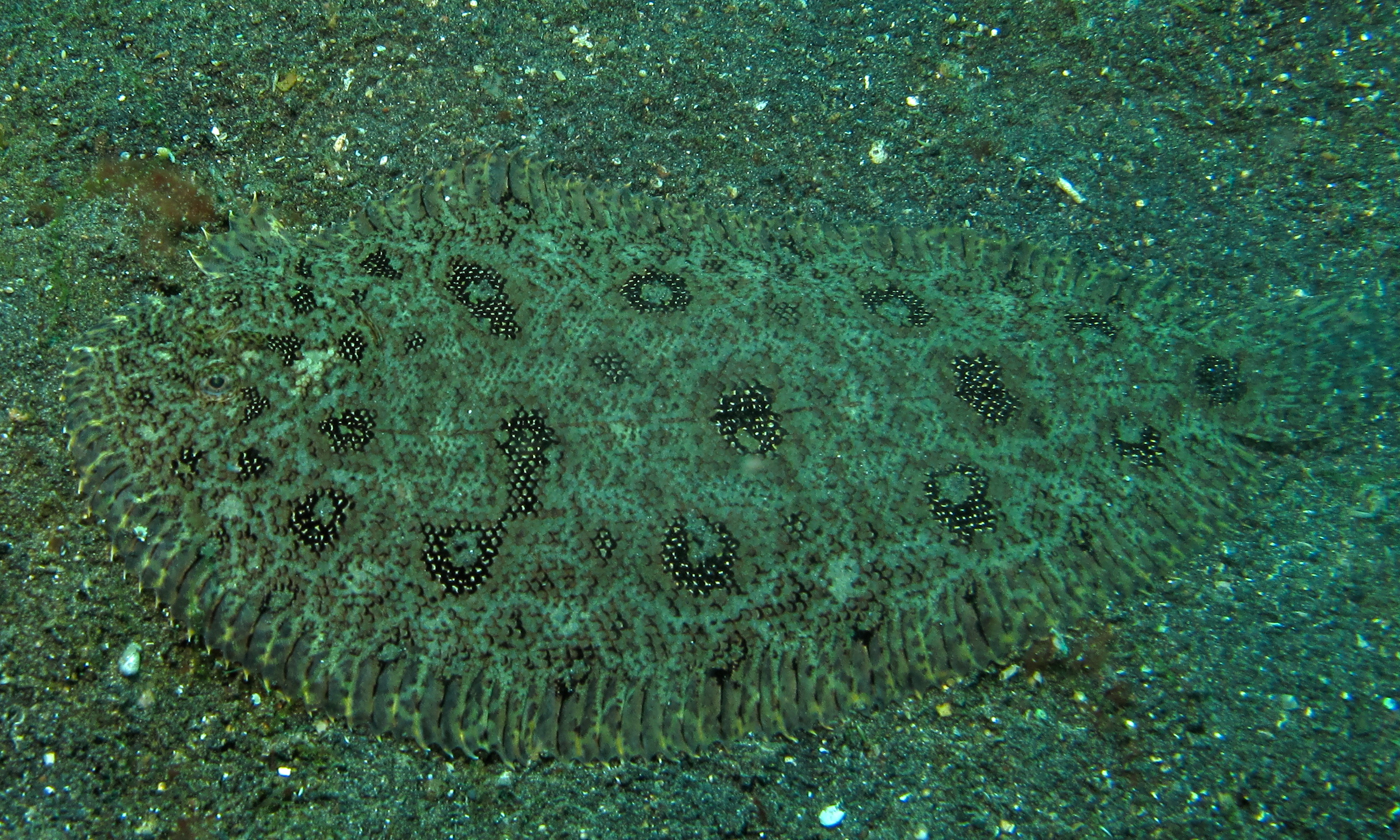
- Liachirus melanospilos

Scientific classification
- Domain: Eukaryota
- Kingdom: Animalia
- Phylum: Chordata
- Class: Actinopterygii
- Order: Carangiformes
- Suborder: Pleuronectoidei
- Family: Soleidae
- Genus: Liachirus; Günther, 1862

Type species
- Liachirus nitidus as a synonym of Liachirus melanospilos Günther, 1862

= Liachirus =

Genus of fishes

Liachirus is a genus of soles native to the Indian and western Pacific oceans.

== Species ==
There are currently two recognized species in this genus:

- Liachirus melanospilos (Bleeker, 1854)
- Liachirus whitleyi Chabanaud, 1950
