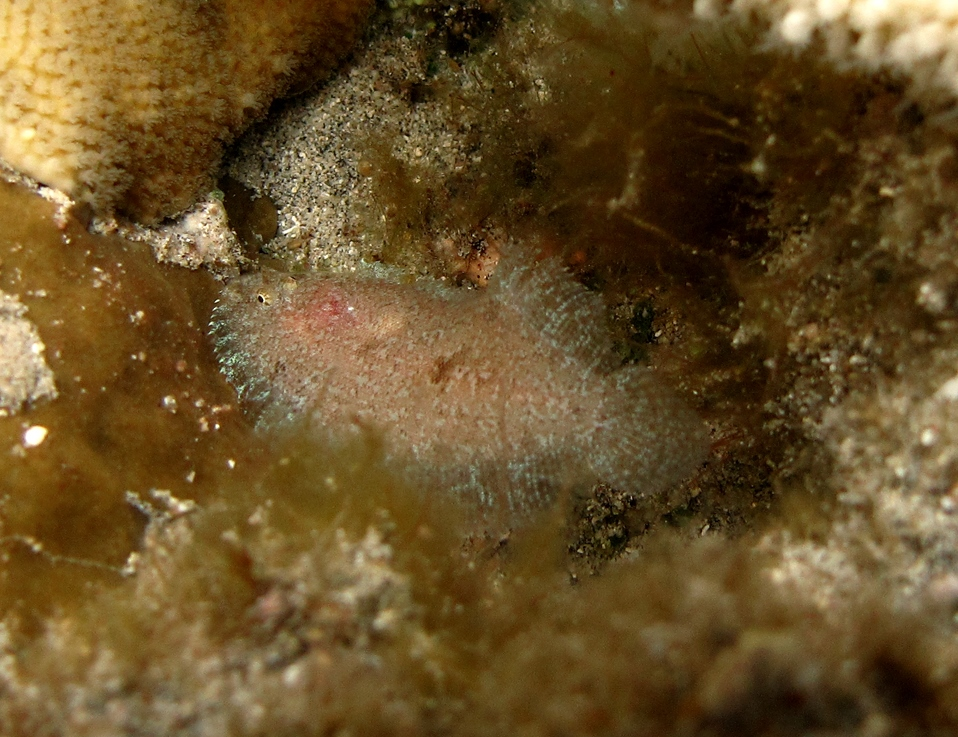
- Aseraggodes diringeri

Scientific classification
- Kingdom: Animalia
- Phylum: Chordata
- Class: Actinopterygii
- Order: Carangiformes
- Suborder: Pleuronectoidei
- Family: Soleidae
- Genus: Aseraggodes; Kaup, 1858

Type species
- Aseraggodes guttulatus Kaup, 1858

Synonyms
- Beaufortella Chabanaud, 1943; Coryphillus Chabanaud, 1931; Parachirus Matsubara & Ochiai, 1963

= Aseraggodes =

Genus of fishes

Aseraggodes is a genus of soles native to the Indian and Pacific oceans. These small flatfishes are poisonous.

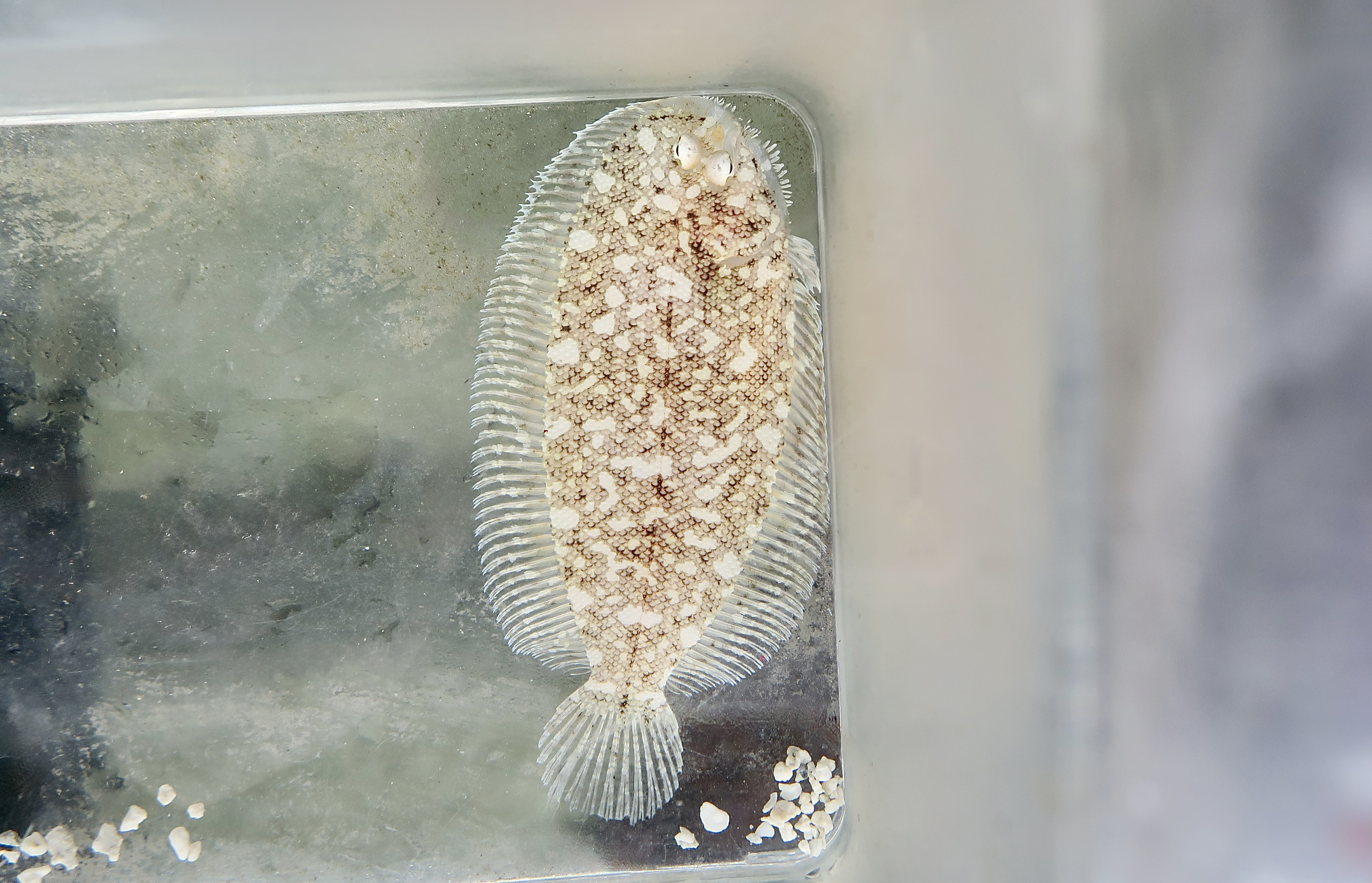
A dwarf sole (Aseraggodes xenicus) at Las Vegas Exotic Fish, an aquarium store.

== Species ==
It is by far the most species rich genus in the family Soleidae, as there currently are 54 recognized species:

- Aseraggodes albidus J. E. Randall & Desoutter-Méniger, 2007
- Aseraggodes andersoni J. E. Randall & Bogorodsky, 2013
- Aseraggodes auroculus J. E. Randall, 2005
- Aseraggodes bahamondei J. E. Randall & Meléndez C., 1987 (South Pacific sole)
- Aseraggodes beauforti Chabanaud, 1930
- Aseraggodes borehami J. E. Randall, 1996 (Boreham's sole)
- Aseraggodes brevirostris J. E. Randall & Gon, 2006
- Aseraggodes chapleaui J. E. Randall & Desoutter-Méniger, 2007
- Aseraggodes cheni J. E. Randall & Senou, 2007
- Aseraggodes corymbus J. E. Randall & Bartsch, 2007
- Aseraggodes crypticus J. E. Randall & G. R. Allen, 2007 (Cryptic Sole)
- Aseraggodes cyaneus (Alcock, 1890)
- Aseraggodes cyclurus J. E. Randall, 2005
- Aseraggodes diringeri (Quéro, 1997)
- Aseraggodes dubius M. C. W. Weber, 1913
- Aseraggodes filiger M. C. W. Weber, 1913
- Aseraggodes firmisquamis J. E. Randall & Bartsch, 2005
- Aseraggodes guttulatus Kaup, 1858
- Aseraggodes haackeanus (Steindachner, 1883) (Southern sole)
- Aseraggodes heemstrai J. E. Randall & Gon, 2006
- Aseraggodes heraldi J. E. Randall & Bartsch, 2005
- Aseraggodes herrei Seale, 1940 (Herre's sole)
- Aseraggodes holcomi J. E. Randall, 2002
- Aseraggodes jenny J. E. Randall & Gon, 2006
- Aseraggodes kaianus (Günther, 1880)
- Aseraggodes kimurai J. E. Randall & Desoutter-Méniger, 2007
- Aseraggodes kobensis (Steindachner, 1896)
- Aseraggodes kruppi J. E. Randall & Bogorodsky, 2013
- Aseraggodes lateralis J. E. Randall, 2005
- Aseraggodes lenisquamis J. E. Randall, 2005
- Aseraggodes longipinnis J. E. Randall & Desoutter-Méniger, 2007
- Aseraggodes macronasus J. E. Randall & Bogorodsky, 2013
- Aseraggodes magnoculus J. E. Randall, 2005
- Aseraggodes martine J. E. Randall & Bogorodsky, 2013
- Aseraggodes matsuurai J. E. Randall & Desoutter-Méniger, 2007
- Aseraggodes melanostictus (W. K. H. Peters, 1877) (Mottled sole)
- Aseraggodes microlepidotus M. C. W. Weber, 1913
- Aseraggodes nigrocirratus J. E. Randall, 2005
- Aseraggodes normani Chabanaud, 1930
- Aseraggodes orientalis J. E. Randall & Senou, 2007
- Aseraggodes pelvicus J. E. Randall, 2005
- Aseraggodes ramsaii (J. D. Ogilby, 1889)
- Aseraggodes satapoomini J. E. Randall & Desoutter-Méniger, 2007
- Aseraggodes senoui J. E. Randall & Desoutter-Méniger, 2007
- Aseraggodes sinusarabici Chabanaud, 1931
- Aseraggodes steinitzi Joglekar, 1971
- Aseraggodes suzumotoi J. E. Randall & Desoutter-Méniger, 2007
- Aseraggodes texturatus M. C. W. Weber, 1913
- Aseraggodes therese J. E. Randall, 1996 (Therese's sole)
- Aseraggodes umbratilis (Alcock, 1894)
- Aseraggodes whitakeri Woods, 1966 (Whitaker's sole)
- Aseraggodes winterbottomi J. E. Randall & Desoutter-Méniger, 2007 (Negros sole)
- Aseraggodes xenicus (Matsubara & Ochiai, 1963) (Dwarf sole)
- Aseraggodes zizette J. E. Randall & Desoutter-Méniger, 2007
