= Heteromycteris matsubarai =

Conservation status
- Data Deficient (IUCN 3.1)

Scientific classification
- Kingdom: Animalia
- Phylum: Chordata
- Class: Actinopterygii
- Order: Carangiformes
- Suborder: Pleuronectoidei
- Family: Soleidae
- Genus: Heteromycteris
- Species: H. matsubarai

Binomial name
- Heteromycteris matsubarai Ochiai, 1963

Species of flatfish

Heteromycteris matsubarai is a species of ray-finned fish in the family Soleidae. The scientific name of the species was first validly published in 1963 by Akira Ochiai.
