= Rendahlia =

Conservation status
- Data Deficient (IUCN 3.1)

Scientific classification
- Kingdom: Animalia
- Phylum: Chordata
- Class: Actinopterygii
- Order: Carangiformes
- Suborder: Pleuronectoidei
- Family: Soleidae
- Genus: Rendahlia; Chabanaud, 1930
- Species: R. jaubertensis

Binomial name
- Rendahlia jaubertensis (Rendahl, 1921)

Synonyms
- Achirus jaubertensis Rendahl, 1921

Genus of fishes

Rendahlia jaubertensis is a species of sole native to the Pacific coast of Australia. This species is the only known member of its genus.
