= Paradicula =

Scientific classification
- Kingdom: Animalia
- Phylum: Chordata
- Class: Actinopterygii
- Division: Teleostei
- Order: Carangiformes
- Suborder: Pleuronectoidei
- Family: Soleidae
- Genus: Paradicula; Whitley, 1931
- Species: P. setifer

Binomial name
- Paradicula setifer (Paradice, 1927)

Synonyms
- Synaptura setifer Paradice, 1927

Species of fish

Paradicula setifer is a species of sole known only from the Pacific coast of Australia. This species is the only known member of its genus.
