= Feylinia grandisquamis =

Scientific classification
- Kingdom: Animalia
- Phylum: Chordata
- Class: Reptilia
- Order: Squamata
- Family: Scincidae
- Genus: Feylinia
- Species: F. grandisquamis

Binomial name
- Feylinia grandisquamis Müller, 1910

Species of lizard

The large-scaled burrowing skink (Feylinia grandisquamis) is an African lizard in the family Scincidae commonly known as skinks. It is found in Cameroon, Gabon, Angola, and Central African Republic.
