= Dagetichthys lusitanicus =

Conservation status
- Data Deficient (IUCN 3.1)

Scientific classification
- Kingdom: Animalia
- Phylum: Chordata
- Class: Actinopterygii
- Order: Carangiformes
- Suborder: Pleuronectoidei
- Family: Soleidae
- Genus: Dagetichthys
- Species: D. lusitanicus

Binomial name
- Dagetichthys lusitanicus (Brito Capello, 1868)

Synonyms
- Synaptura lusitanica de Brito Capello, 1868; Synaptura punctatissima Peters, 1876

Species of fish

Dagetichthys lusitanicus, commonly known as the Portuguese sole, is a species of flatfish native to the eastern Atlantic Ocean. Little is known of the abundance or behaviour of this fish, and the International Union for Conservation of Nature has rated its conservation status as being "data deficient".

== Description ==
The Portuguese sole grows to a standard length of about 35 cm (14 in). The general shape is oval, tapering somewhat towards the tail. Like other flatfish, the body is flattened laterally and the fish lies on its side, with both eyes on the right side; the upper eye is slightly in front of the lower one. The dorsal fin starts from the edge of the head and has 79 to 83 soft rays. The anal fin has 57 to 67 soft rays and it and the dorsal fin are continuous with the caudal fin. The upper side of the fish is greyish-brown, with black blotches, arranged in indistinct longitudinal rows. The underside of the fish is whitish.

== Distribution ==
The Portuguese sole is native to the tropical and sub-tropical eastern Atlantic Ocean. Its range extends from Portugal to Angola. It is also present in the Cape Verde Islands and São Tomé and Príncipe. It was first recorded in the Mediterranean Sea in the early 1960s along the coast of Spain and has since extended its range to Libyan waters.

It is a demersal fish, living on, or just above, the seabed at depths down to about 160 m (525 ft), on sandy and muddy substrates.

== Status ==
Over most of its range, the Portuguese sole is caught by trawling by artisanal fishermen, and in some areas, by commercial trawling as well. It is not usually the target species, but is caught largely as bycatch. There are no records of the quantities of fish taken, and the total population size of this fish is unknown, so the International Union for Conservation of Nature has rated its conservation status as "data deficient".
