= Tufted sole =

Conservation status
- Least Concern (IUCN 3.1)

Scientific classification
- Kingdom: Animalia
- Phylum: Chordata
- Class: Actinopterygii
- Order: Carangiformes
- Suborder: Pleuronectoidei
- Family: Soleidae
- Genus: Dexillus; Chabanaud, 1930
- Species: D. muelleri

Binomial name
- Dexillus muelleri (Steindachner, 1879)

Synonyms
- Brachirus muelleri (Steindachner, 1879); Dexillichthys muelleri (Steindachner, 1879); Strandichthys muelleri (Steindachner, 1879); Synaptura arafurensis Günther, 1880; Synaptura muelleri Steindachner, 1879

Species of fish

The tufted sole (Dexillus muelleri) is a species of flatfish from the family of true soles Soleidae. It is the only species in the monotypic genus Dexillus. It is found in the Indian and western Pacific Oceans.

The tufted sole is found over seabeds which consist of sand, mud, gravel, and sea grass bottoms on the inner continental shelf, they are frequently recorded as coming into bays and the mouths of estuaries. They feed on a variety of benthic invertebrates and the maximum recorded standard length for this species is 221mm.

This species has been recorded from India and Sri Lanka, east through the Malay Archipelago and northern Australia to Tonga, Fiji and American Samoa. Its northern limit is the Philippines. It is of minor commercial importance.

Two other species, Brachirus macrolepis and Synaptura megalepidoura, which have both been placed by some authors in the genus Brachirus, alongside Dexillus muelleri, are also placed in the genus Dexillus by some authorities.
