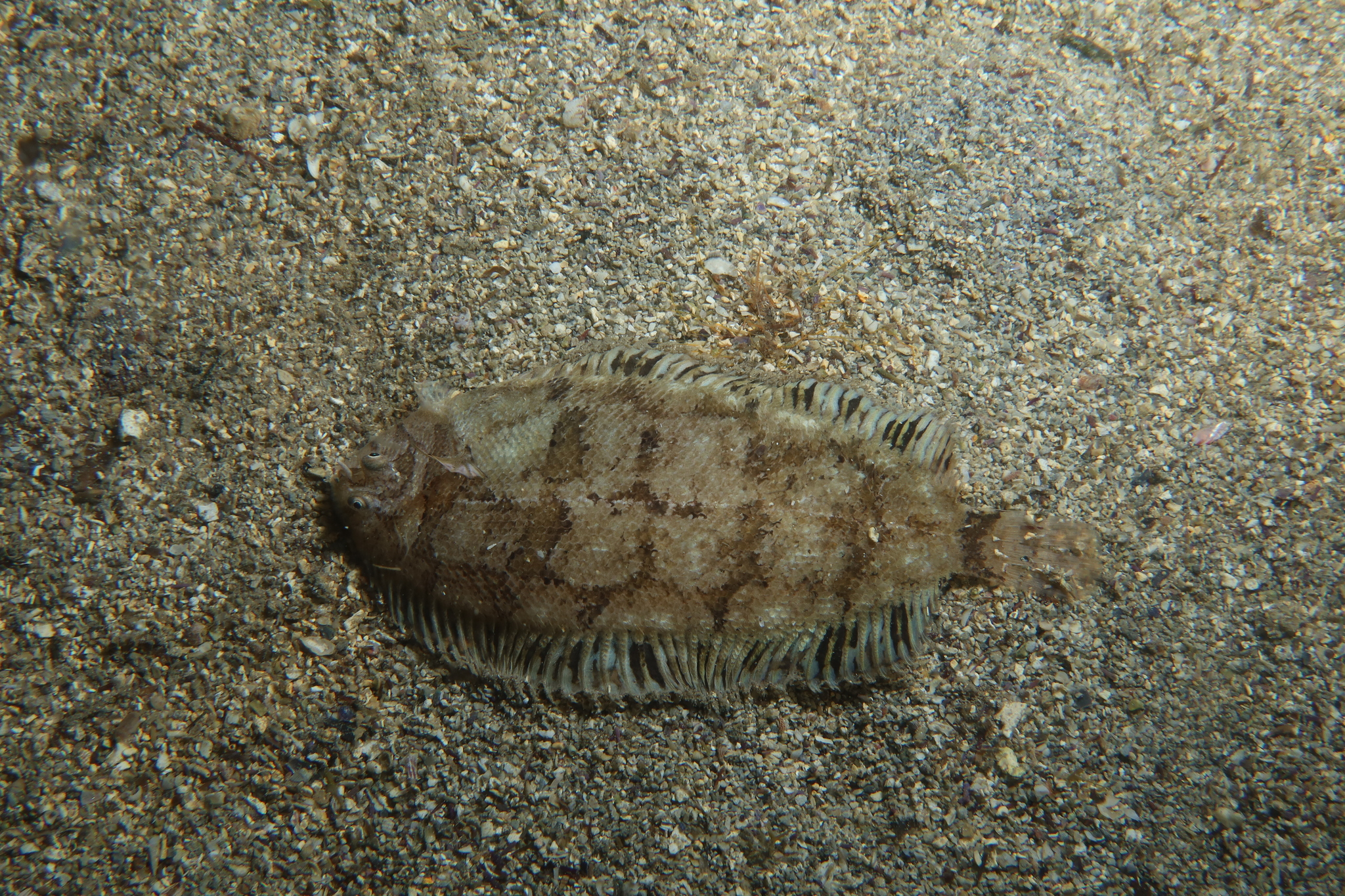
- Monochirus hispidus

Scientific classification
- Kingdom: Animalia
- Phylum: Chordata
- Class: Actinopterygii
- Order: Carangiformes
- Suborder: Pleuronectoidei
- Family: Soleidae
- Genus: Monochirus; Rafinesque, 1814

Type species
- Monochirus hispidus Rafinesque, 1814

= Monochirus =

Genus of fishes

Monochirus is a genus of small soles. It contains two species; one from the northeast Atlantic and Mediterranean, and the second from the South China Sea.

== Species ==
There are currently two recognized species in this genus:

- Monochirus hispidus Rafinesque, 1814 (Whiskered sole)
- Monochirus trichodactylus (Linnaeus, 1758)
