= Feylinia macrolepis =

Scientific classification
- Kingdom: Animalia
- Phylum: Chordata
- Class: Reptilia
- Order: Squamata
- Family: Scincidae
- Genus: Feylinia
- Species: F. macrolepis

Binomial name
- Feylinia macrolepis Boettger, 1887

Species of lizard

Feylinia macrolepis is an African lizard in the family Scincidae commonly known as skinks. It is found in Republic of the Congo, and Central African Republic.
