= Feylinia boulengeri =

Conservation status
- Least Concern (IUCN 3.1)

Scientific classification
- Kingdom: Animalia
- Phylum: Chordata
- Class: Reptilia
- Order: Squamata
- Family: Scincidae
- Genus: Feylinia
- Species: F. boulengeri

Binomial name
- Feylinia boulengeri Chabanaud, 1917

Synonyms
- Feylinia boulengeri Chabanaud, 1917; Chabanaudia boulengeri — de Witte & Laurent, 1943; Feylinia boulengeri — Brygoo, 1983

Species of lizard

Feylinia boulengeri is a species of skink, a lizard in the family Scincidae. The species is native to Central Africa.

== Description ==
F. boulengeri, like all species in the genus Feylinia, has no legs, and has reduced eyes and ear openings covered with skin.

== Geographic range ==
F. boulengeri is endemic to Gabon.

== Habitat ==
The preferred natural habitat of F. boulengeri is forest, at an altitude of 20 m (66 ft).

== Behavior ==
F. boulengeri is terrestrial and fossorial.

== Reproduction ==
The mode of reproduction of F. boulengeri is unknown.

== Etymology ==
The specific name, boulengeri, is in honor of Belgian-born British herpetologist George Albert Boulenger.
