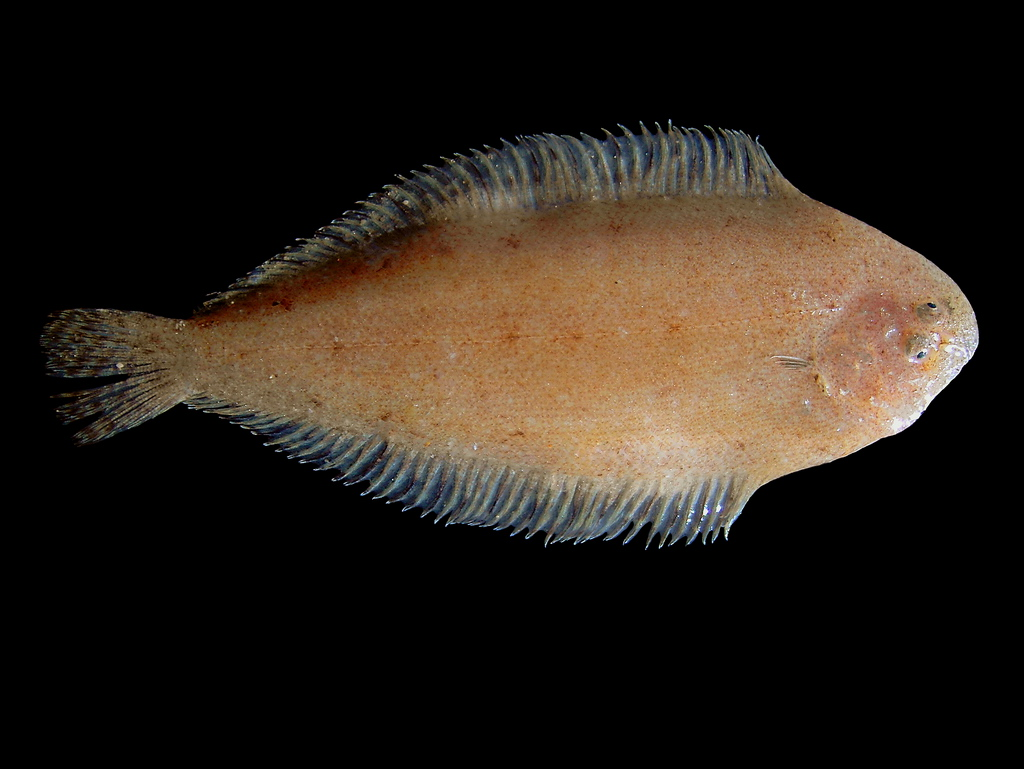

Conservation status
- Least Concern (IUCN 3.1)

Scientific classification
- Kingdom: Animalia
- Phylum: Chordata
- Class: Actinopterygii
- Division: Teleostei
- Order: Carangiformes
- Suborder: Pleuronectoidei
- Family: Soleidae
- Genus: Buglossidium; Chabanaud, 1930
- Species: B. luteum

Binomial name
- Buglossidium luteum (A. Risso, 1810)
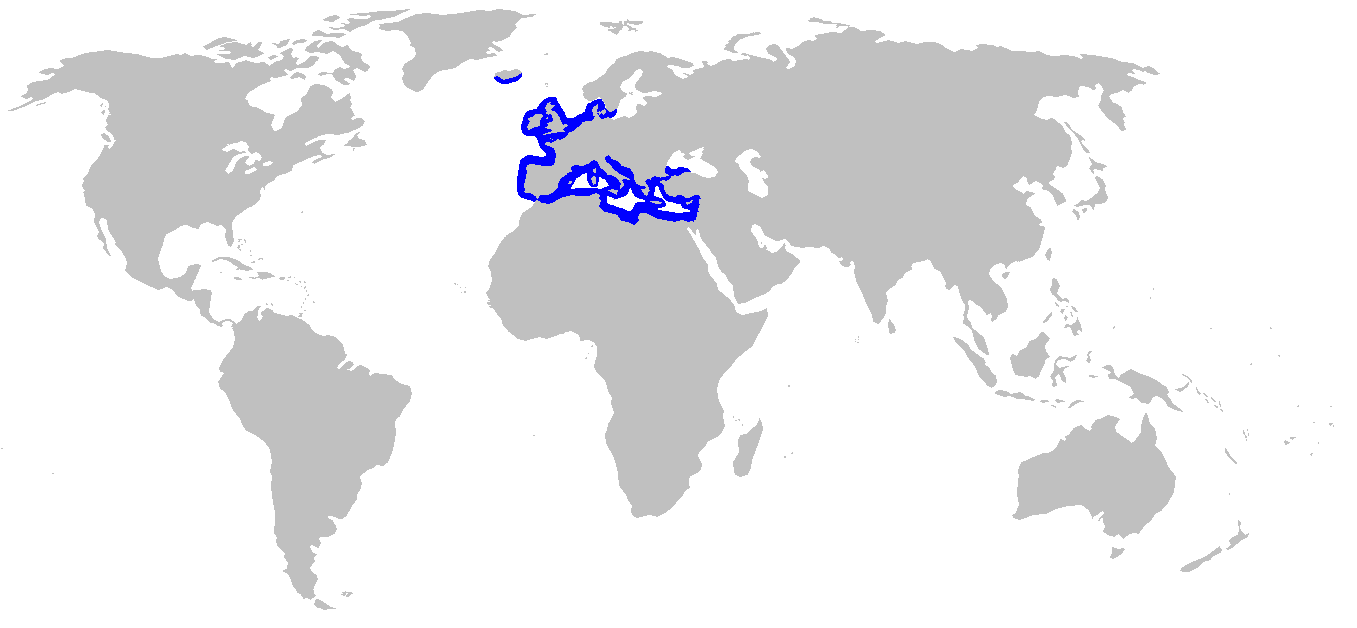
- Range of the solenette

Synonyms
- Pleuronectes luteus Risso, 1810; Monochirus luteus (Risso, 1810); Rhombus luteus (Risso, 1810); Solea lutea (Risso, 1810)

= Solenette =

Solenette Temporal range: Early Miocene–present

Species of fish

The solenette or yellow sole, Buglossidium luteum, is a species of flatfish in the family Soleidae, and the only member of its genus. It is characterized by its small size, low-slung semi-circular mouth, and regularly placed dark fin rays. A common and widespread species, it is native to sandy bottoms in the northeastern Atlantic Ocean and the Mediterranean Sea. It is of little commercial value.

A fossil relative, †Buglossidium apsheronskiense Bannikov, 2001 is known from the Early Miocene of the North Caucasus, Russia.

== Distribution and habitat ==
The solenette occurs in the northeastern Atlantic Ocean from Iceland and Scotland southward, as well as in the North Sea, Kattegat and the Baltic Sea. It also occurs in the Mediterranean Sea, including the Adriatic Sea, the Sea of Marmara, and the Bosphorus. It has been reported from a range of 5–450 m (16–1,476 ft), but is rare in very shallow waters. The highest abundances occur at depths of 5–15 m (16–49 ft) in the English Channel and at 20–35 m (66–115 ft) in the Bay of Biscay. Their distribution is not restricted by sediment type as in some other flatfish species. In the Solway Firth, there is a general movement offshore in the winter.

This species has more specific habitat requirements than other widespread Atlantic flatfish such as the European plaice, common sole, and common dab. It is concentrated in waters moderately influenced by estuary outflows, at a salinity of 29–33 ppt, and is absent from the mouths of the largest estuaries where the salinity is lower. The solenette is often found on or half-buried in muddy or muddy-sandy substrates.

== Description ==
The smallest of the soles in European waters, the solenette usually measures 10–13 cm (3.9–5.1 in) long and attains a maximum length of 15 cm (5.9 in). It has an oval, compressed, slightly elongate body with both eyes on the right side of the head. The snout is rounded with the upper jaw slightly elongated to form a "beak". The diameter of the upper eye is less than the distance between it and the front of the head. The dorsal fin begins on the anterior profile of the head, with 65–78 fin rays. The anal fin contains 49–63 fin rays, and the caudal fin is connected to the dorsal and anal fins by a small membrane. The pectoral fin on the eyed side is small, with 3–5 fin rays, and the one on the blind side is reduced to 1 long and 1–2 short fin rays.

The lateral line scales number 55–70, and are rectangular in shape with short, strongly curved intercanalicular striae. The coloration of the eyed side is variable, frequently yellowish or light brown with or without darker blotches or spots. The dorsal and anal fins are sandy with every 5th or 6th (occasionally 4th or 7th) fin ray dark for the majority of their lengths. The solenette can change its color to better match its background.

== Biology and ecology ==
Adult solenette feed on a variety of small benthic organisms, mainly crustaceans (copepods, amphipods, and cumaceans), bivalve molluscs, and polychaete worms. The diet of the solenette varies by geographical region; solenette from the English Channel feed on a larger variety of prey than those from the Bay of Biscay, and take proportionally more polychaetes as opposed to crustaceans and molluscs for the Bay of Biscay. Feeding activity peaks in summer and declines markedly in winter.

The solenette spawns in February in the Mediterranean, from March to June in the Bay of Biscay, and in July and August in the western English Channel, North Sea, and western Ireland. The eggs are small and distinguishable from those of other soles by having only a few large oil globules. The larvae hatch at about 2 mm long, with metamorphosis beginning at about 7 mm long and being complete at 8–9 mm. In appearance the larvae are similar to those of the common sole, but with fewer large stellate chromatophores. There is also a distinct patch of pigment on the ventral abdominal wall, and the distinct shape of the head is also apparent in the early stages.

In the North Sea, there are no special nursery areas, with juveniles and adults occurring in the same areas. The young take up a benthic lifestyle at 12 mm long. Most growth occurs in the first year of life and continues at a relatively low and constant rate afterwards. Both sexes mature in their third year, with males growing faster than females and females attaining a larger ultimate size. The maximum reported age is 13 years.

== Relationship to humans ==
The solenette is too small to be of commercial interest and is usually discarded by fishers. It is caught as bycatch in trawls, sometimes in large numbers, and historically has often been confused with the young of the common sole. Between 1985 and 2006, the range of the solenette increased significantly in the North Sea, which is believed to be a consequence of rising sea bottom temperatures.
