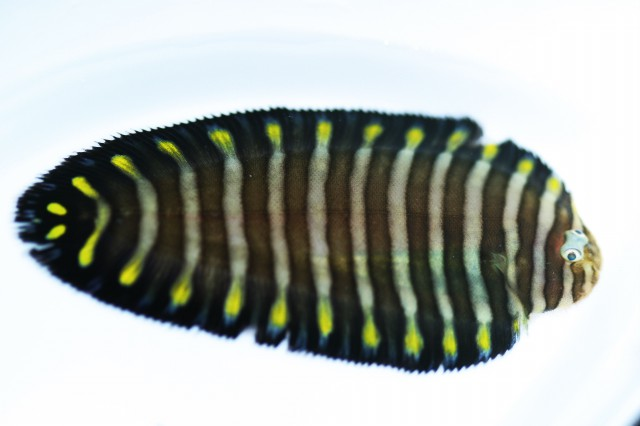

Conservation status
- Least Concern (IUCN 3.1)

Scientific classification
- Kingdom: Animalia
- Phylum: Chordata
- Class: Actinopterygii
- Order: Carangiformes
- Suborder: Pleuronectoidei
- Family: Soleidae
- Genus: Aesopia
- Species: A. cornuta

Binomial name
- Aesopia cornuta Kaup, 1858

= Aesopia =

Unicorn sole

Species of fish

Aesopia cornuta is a species of sole native to the Indian and western Pacific Oceans. Its common names include the unicorn sole, thickray sole, banded sole, and dark thick-rayed sole. This species grows to a standard length of 25 cm (9.8 in), and is the only known member of its genus.

== See also ==
- Pseudaesopia and Zebrias, two related genera with similar striped patterns
