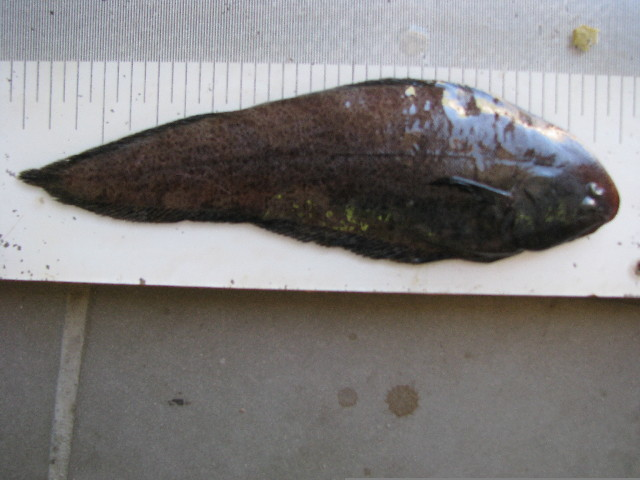
- West Coast Sole (A. microlepis)

Scientific classification
- Kingdom: Animalia
- Phylum: Chordata
- Class: Actinopterygii
- Order: Carangiformes
- Suborder: Pleuronectoidei
- Family: Soleidae
- Genus: Austroglossus; Regan, 1920

Type species
- Synaptura pectoralis Kaup, 1858

= Austroglossus =

Genus of fishes

Austroglossus is a genus of soles native to the Atlantic coast of southern Africa.

== Species ==
There are currently two recognized species in this genus:

- Austroglossus microlepis (Bleeker, 1863) (West coast sole)
- Austroglossus pectoralis (Kaup, 1858) (Mud sole)
