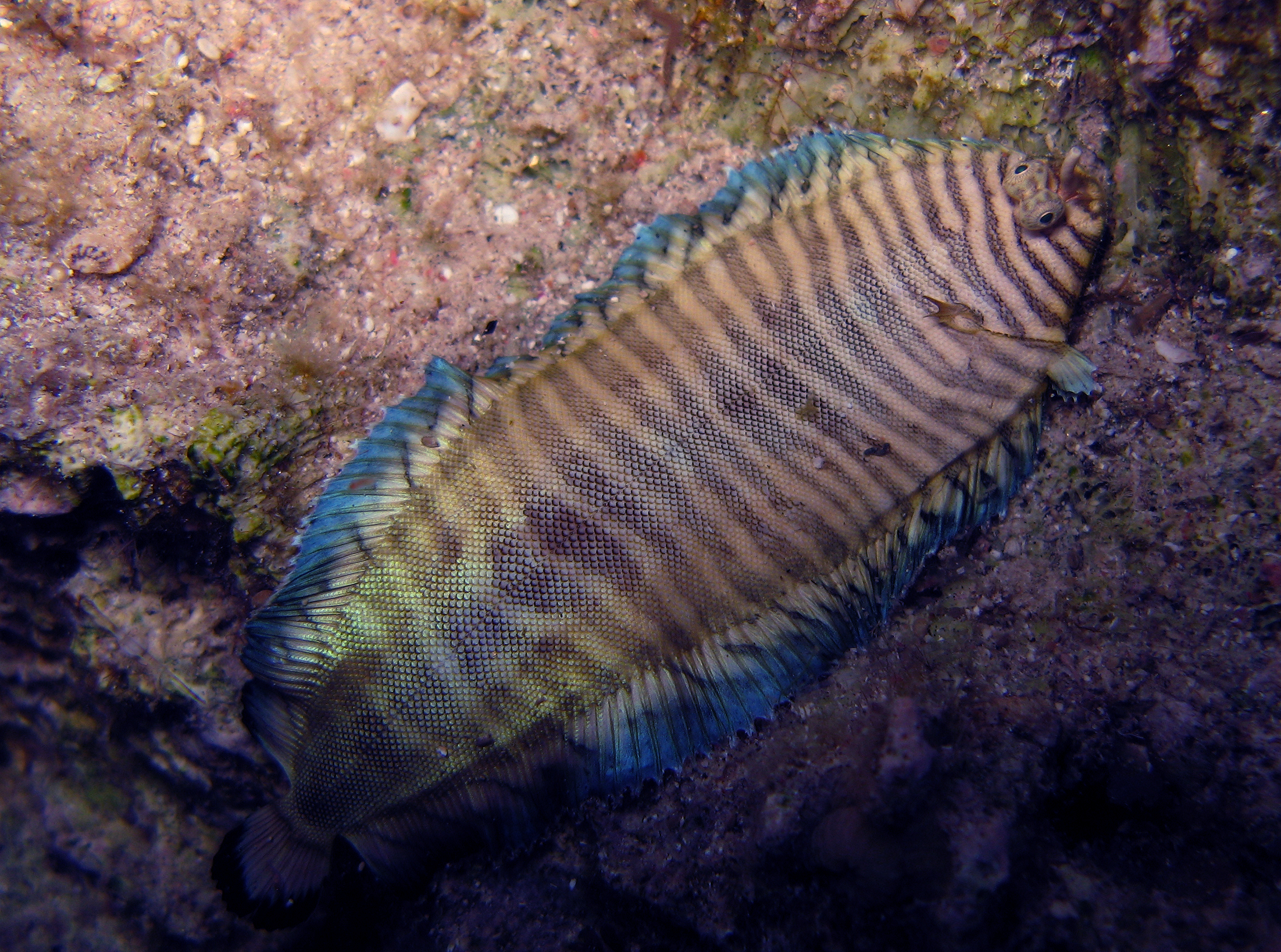
- S. heterorhinos

Scientific classification
- Domain: Eukaryota
- Kingdom: Animalia
- Phylum: Chordata
- Class: Actinopterygii
- Order: Carangiformes
- Suborder: Pleuronectoidei
- Family: Soleidae
- Genus: Soleichthys; Bleeker, 1860

Type species
- Solea heterorhinos Bleeker, 1856

= Soleichthys =

Genus of fishes

Soleichthys is a genus of small soles native to coastal waters in the Indo-Pacific.

== Species ==
There are currently eight recognized species in this genus:

- Soleichthys dori J. E. Randall & Munroe, 2008
- Soleichthys heterorhinos (Bleeker, 1856)
- Soleichthys maculosus Muchhala & Munroe, 2004 (Whiteblotched sole)
- Soleichthys microcephalus (Günther, 1862) (Small-head sole)
- Soleichthys oculofasciatus Munroe & Menke, 2004 (Banded-eye sole)
- Soleichthys serpenpellis Munroe & Menke, 2004 (Snakeskin sole)
- Soleichthys siammakuti Wongratana, 1975
- Soleichthys tubiferus (W. K. H. Peters, 1876)
