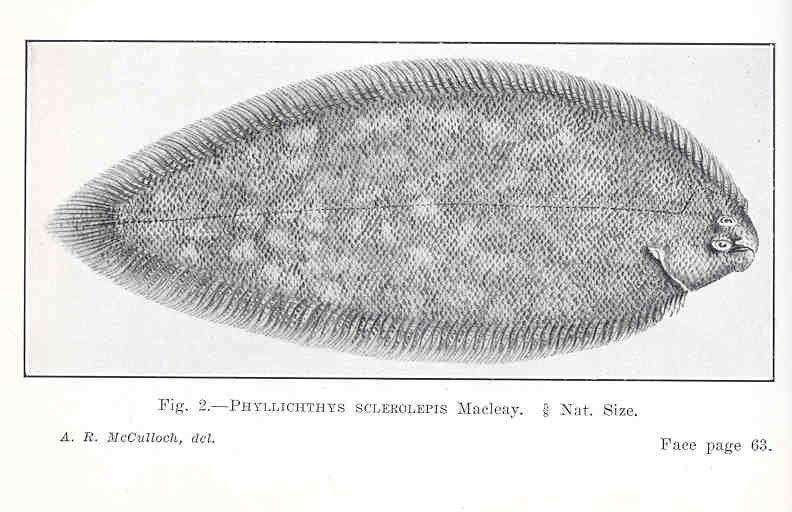
- Phyllichthys sclerolepis

Scientific classification
- Domain: Eukaryota
- Kingdom: Animalia
- Phylum: Chordata
- Class: Actinopterygii
- Order: Carangiformes
- Suborder: Pleuronectoidei
- Family: Soleidae
- Genus: Phyllichthys; McCulloch, 1916

Type species
- Synaptura sclerolepis Macleay, 1878

= Phyllichthys =

Genus of fishes

Phyllichthys is a genus of soles native to the Western Pacific and Eastern Indian oceans.

== Species ==
There are currently three recognized species in this genus:

- Phyllichthys punctatus McCulloch, 1916 (Spotted sole)
- Phyllichthys sclerolepis (W. J. Macleay, 1878)
- Phyllichthys sejunctus Whitley, 1935
