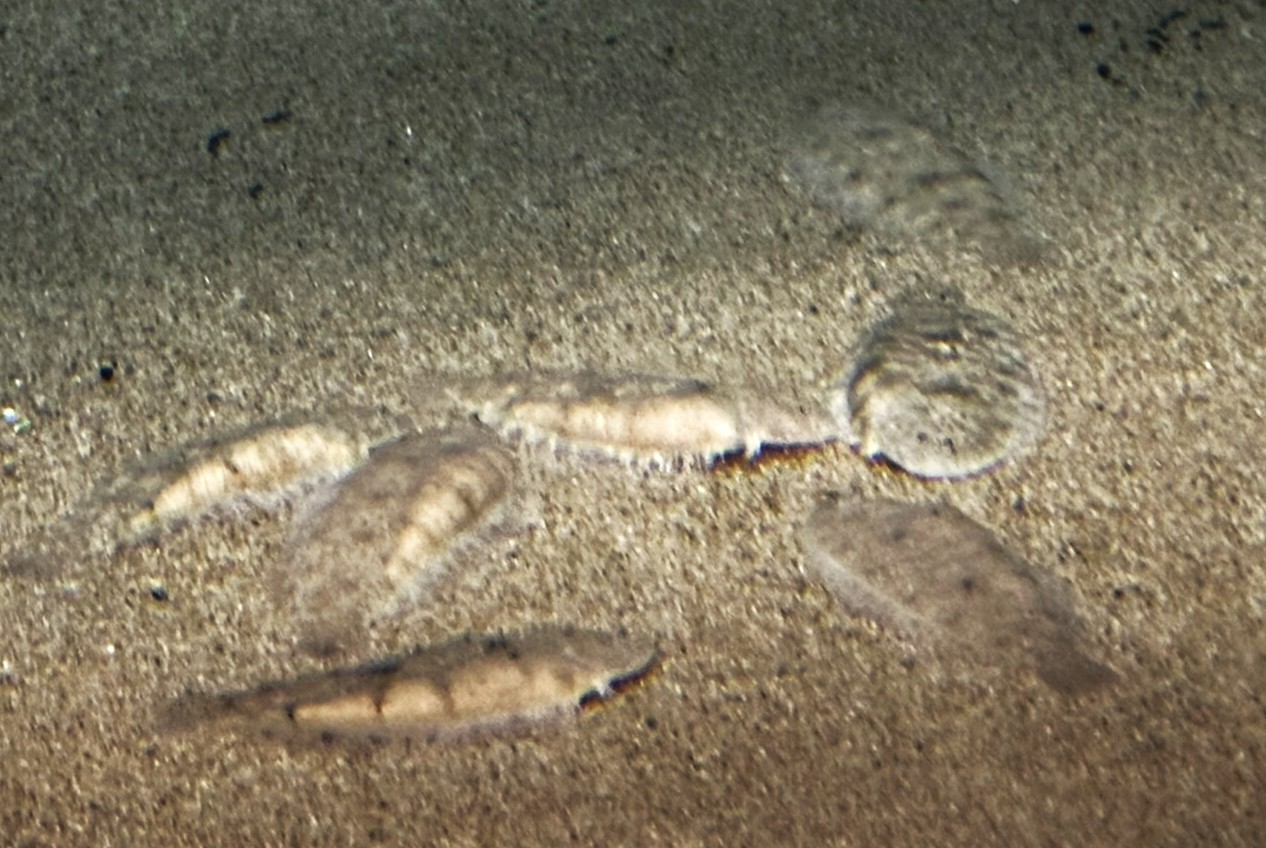
- Leptachirus klunzingeri

Scientific classification
- Kingdom: Animalia
- Phylum: Chordata
- Class: Actinopterygii
- Order: Carangiformes
- Suborder: Pleuronectoidei
- Family: Soleidae
- Genus: Leptachirus; J. E. Randall, 2007

Type species
- Leptachirus alleni Randall, 2007

= Leptachirus =

Genus of fishes

Leptachirus is a genus of small soles native to brackish and fresh water in New Guinea and northern Australia.

== Species ==
There are currently nine recognized species in this genus:

- Leptachirus alleni J. E. Randall, 2007 (Allen's Sole)
- Leptachirus bensbach J. E. Randall, 2007 (Bensbach River Sole)
- Leptachirus darwinensis J. E. Randall, 2007 (Darwin Sole)
- Leptachirus kikori J. E. Randall, 2007 (Kikori River Sole)
- Leptachirus klunzingeri (M. C. W. Weber, 1907) (Tailed sole)
- Leptachirus lorentz J. E. Randall, 2007 (Lorentz River Sole)
- Leptachirus polylepis J. E. Randall, 2007 (Manyscale Sole)
- Leptachirus robertsi J. E. Randall, 2007 (Robert's Sole)
- Leptachirus triramus J. E. Randall, 2007 (Three-line Sole)
