= Dagetichthys marginatus =

Conservation status
- Data Deficient (IUCN 3.1)

Scientific classification
- Kingdom: Animalia
- Phylum: Chordata
- Class: Actinopterygii
- Order: Carangiformes
- Suborder: Pleuronectoidei
- Family: Soleidae
- Genus: Dagetichthys
- Species: D. marginatus

Binomial name
- Dagetichthys marginatus (Boulenger, 1900)

Synonyms
- Synaptura marginata Boulenger, 1900

Species of marine fish

Dagetichthys marginatus, commonly known as the white-margined sole, is a species of flatfish native to the eastern Atlantic Ocean. Little is known of the abundance or behaviour of this fish, and the International Union for Conservation of Nature has rated its conservation status as being "data deficient".

== Description ==
The white-margined sole grows to a standard length of about 50 cm (20 in).The general shape is that of a typical sole. Like other flatfish, the body is flattened laterally and the fish lies on its side. The dorsal fin starts from the edge of the head and has 70 to 76 soft rays. The anal fin has 54 to 63 soft rays. These fins are continuous with pale edges; right pectoral fin is blackish. The upper side of the fish is dark brown, sometimes with darker specks.

== Distribution ==
The white-margined sole is native to a relatively narrow distribution in shallow, coastal waters of South Africa.

It is a demersal fish, living in very shallow water at depths less than 2 m (7 ft).

== Status ==
Over most of its range, the white-margined sole is harvested, especially in summer-time, in recreational fisheries and it may be a component of bycatch in inshore, demersal fisheries. There are no records of the quantities of fish taken, and the total population size of this fish is unknown, so the International Union for Conservation of Nature has rated its conservation status as "data deficient".
