= Feylinia elegans =

Scientific classification
- Kingdom: Animalia
- Phylum: Chordata
- Class: Reptilia
- Order: Squamata
- Family: Scincidae
- Genus: Feylinia
- Species: F. elegans

Binomial name
- Feylinia elegans (Hallowell, 1854)

Synonyms
- Acontias elegans Hallowell, 1854; Sphenorhina elegans — Hallowell, 1857; Anelytrops elegans — Bocage, 1866

Species of lizard

Feylinia elegans, the elegant feylinia, is an African lizard in the family Scincidae commonly known as skinks. It is found in Equatorial Guinea, Republic of the Congo, Democratic Republic of the Congo, northernmost Angola (including Cabinda), and Central African Republic.
