= Feylinia polylepis =

Scientific classification
- Domain: Eukaryota
- Kingdom: Animalia
- Phylum: Chordata
- Class: Reptilia
- Order: Squamata
- Family: Scincidae
- Genus: Feylinia
- Species: F. polylepis

Binomial name
- Feylinia polylepis Bocage, 1887

Species of lizard

The manyscaled feylinia (Feylinia polylepis) is a species of skink in the family Scincidae. It is endemic to the island of Príncipe in São Tomé and Príncipe.
