= Typhlachirus =

Scientific classification
- Kingdom: Animalia
- Phylum: Chordata
- Class: Actinopterygii
- Division: Teleostei
- Order: Carangiformes
- Suborder: Pleuronectoidei
- Family: Soleidae
- Genus: Typhlachirus; Hardenberg, 1931
- Species: T. caecus

Binomial name
- Typhlachirus caecus Hardenberg, 1931

Species of fish

Typhlachirus caecus is a species of sole native to the coastal waters of Indonesia. This species grows to a length of 14 centimetres (5.5 in) TL. This species is the only known member of its genus.
