= Dagetichthys =

Scientific classification
- Kingdom: Animalia
- Phylum: Chordata
- Class: Actinopterygii
- Order: Carangiformes
- Suborder: Pleuronectoidei
- Family: Soleidae
- Genus: Dagetichthys; Stauch & Blanc, 1964

Type species
- Dagetichthys lakdoensis Stauch & Blanc, 1964

Synonyms
- Trichobrachirus Chabanaud, 1943; Synaptura Cantor, 1849

Genus of fishes

Dagetichthys is a genus of soles. They are found in salt and brackish water in the East Atlantic and Eastern Indian Ocean, but D. lakdoensis is restricted to fresh water in Cameroon.

== Taxonomy ==
Dagetichthys was previously a monotypic genus which contained just D. lakdoensis. Synaptura was considered an incorrect designation by the ICZN and their species were added here.

== Species ==
Six species are recognized as valid:

- Dagetichthys albomaculatus (Kaup, 1858)
- Dagetichthys cadenati (Chabanaud, 1948)
- Dagetichthys commersonnii (Lacepède, 1802)
- Dagetichthys lakdoensis Stauch & Blanc, 1964
- Dagetichthys lusitanicus (Brito Capello, 1868)
- Dagetichthys marginatus (Boulenger, 1900)
