= Feylinia currori =

Conservation status
- Least Concern (IUCN 3.1)

Scientific classification
- Kingdom: Animalia
- Phylum: Chordata
- Class: Reptilia
- Order: Squamata
- Family: Scincidae
- Genus: Feylinia
- Species: F. currori

Binomial name
- Feylinia currori Gray, 1845

Species of lizard

Feylinia currori, also known commonly as Curror's skink, the western forest feylinia, and the western forest limbless skink, is a species of lizard in the family Scincidae. The species is indigenous to Central Africa.

== Etymology ==
The specific name, currori, is in honor of J. Curror of the Royal Navy, who presented the holotype to John Edward Gray.

== Geographic range ==
F. currori is found in northern Angola (including Cabinda Province), Cameroon, Central African Republic, Democratic Republic of the Congo, Republic of Congo, Gabon, Kenya, Nigeria, and Tanzania.

== Habitat ==
The preferred natural habitats of F. currori are forest and savanna, at altitudes from sea level to 1,500 m (4,900 ft).

== Description ==
F. currori may attain a total length of 31 cm (12 in), including a tail of 10.5 cm (4.1 in).

== Diet ==
F. currori predominately preys upon termites.

== Reproduction ==
The mode of reproduction of F. currori is uncertain. It has reported to be oviparous and viviparous.

== Taxonomy ==
F. currori is the type species of the genus Feylinia.
