= Rhinosolea =

Conservation status
- Data Deficient (IUCN 3.1)

Scientific classification
- Kingdom: Animalia
- Phylum: Chordata
- Class: Actinopterygii
- Order: Carangiformes
- Suborder: Pleuronectoidei
- Family: Soleidae
- Genus: Rhinosolea; Fowler, 1946
- Species: R. microlepidota

Binomial name
- Rhinosolea microlepidota Fowler, 1946

Genus of fishes

Rhinosolea microlepidota is a species of sole native to the Pacific Ocean from around the Ryukyu Islands. This species grows to a length of 2.4 centimetres (0.94 in) SL. This species is the only known member of its genus.
