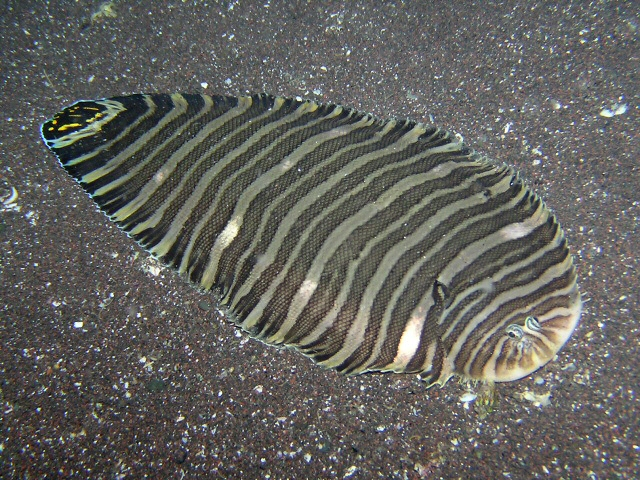
- Zebrias zebra

Scientific classification
- Kingdom: Animalia
- Phylum: Chordata
- Class: Actinopterygii
- Division: Teleostei
- Order: Carangiformes
- Suborder: Pleuronectoidei
- Family: Soleidae
- Genus: Zebrias; D. S. Jordan & Snyder, 1900

Type species
- Solea zebrina Temminck & Schlegel, 1846

Synonyms
- Haplozebrias Chabanaud, 1943; Holonodus Chabanaud, 1936; Nematozebrias Chabanaud, 1943; Strabozebrias Chabanaud, 1943

= Zebrias =

Genus of fishes

Zebrias is a genus of ray-finned fish in the family Soleidae.

== Taxonomy ==
The genus Zebrias was created in 1900 by David Starr Jordan and John Otterbein Snyder. It was named after the fish in its genus' stripes, which resemble that of a zebra's. The genus has been around for many years, but most research has been ignored until the 19th century.

=== Species ===
The 16 currently recognized species in this genus are:

- Zebrias altipinnis (Alcock, 1890)
- Zebrias callizona (Regan, 1903)
- Zebrias cancellatus (McCulloch, 1916) (harrowed sole)
- Zebrias captivus J. E. Randall, 1995 (convict zebra sole)
- Zebrias craticulus (McCulloch, 1916) (Wickerwork sole)
- Zebrias crossolepis P. S. Cheng & Y. W. Chang, 1965
- Zebrias japonicus (Bleeker, 1860)
- Zebrias keralensis Joglekar, 1976
- Zebrias lucapensis Seigel & Adamson, 1985
- Zebrias maculosus Oommen, 1977
- Zebrias munroi (Whitley, 1966)
- Zebrias penescalaris M. F. Gomon, 1987 (duskybanded sole)
- Zebrias quagga (Kaup, 1858) (fringefin zebra sole)
- Zebrias scalaris M. F. Gomon, 1987 (many-band sole)
- Zebrias zebra (Bloch, 1787) (zebra sole)
- Zebrias zebrinus (Temminck & Schlegel, 1846)

Incertae sedis

- Zebrias annandalei Talwar & Chakrapany, 1967

Synonyms

- Zebrias fasciatus (Basilewsky, 1855); valid as Zebrias zebrinus (Temminck & Schlegel, 1846)
- Zebrias regani; valid as Pseudaesopia regani (South African zebra sole)
- Zebrias synapturoides; valid as Pseudaesopia synapturoides (Indian zebra sole)

== Characteristics ==
Both eyes are located on the top of the fish along with their coloured bands while a pectoral fin is located on the bottom. The dorsal and anal fins merge in to become the caudal fin which is noticeable by its yellow marks. The fish is oval-like in shape and most are seen to be 6–10 centimetres (2.4–3.9 in) in length, but can reach up to 20 centimetres (7.9 in). Some members of this genus are toxic, which is a quality that some have accumulated during evolution to enhance feeding.

== Distribution ==
Species in the genus Zebrias are benthic and found in saltwater and brackish environments. They often live close to the coast in shallow waters ranging from 5–40 metres (16–131 ft) in depth. They are most commonly found in sandy areas or near seagrasses where they can blend into their environment most efficiently. They can be found in tropical environments where they are native to the coastal waters in the Indo-Pacific.

== Behavior ==
Like other flatfish, fish in the genus Zebrias avoid predators based by hiding and camouflaging. To move, they undulate their dorsal and anal fins to crawl along the ocean floor. Their flat bodies and colour allow them to blend into the sea floor to match the texture of the sea floor. They may also bury themselves under the sediment if a predator is near and stay completely still making them almost completely invisible.

=== Reproduction and development ===
These species are oviparous as they shed eggs directly into the water column. They reproduce by external fertilization in which the sperm fertilizes an egg outside of the organism. Species in Zebrias begin their life as bilaterally symmetrical larvae that swim up-right with an eye on both sides of the head. When transitioning into juvenile fish they metamorphose asymmetrically causing a dorsoventrally flat adult.

=== Feeding ===
Zebrias feed by swimming along the ocean floor searching for food. Their flatted bodies help with scanning food from the sea floor. Their eyes are located on the top allowing them to see food from above. They are carnivores that feed mainly on polychaete worms, molluscs, small crustaceans, and other small benthic organisms. They rely mostly on their visual cues to detect predators and catch prey. Often, their yellow tail is positioned vertically, which is thought to act as a lure to prey on organisms.

== Ecology ==
Fish in this genus maintain a balanced number of species. However, they are a part of the Soleidae, in which overfishing in Europe has caused many genera of sole fish to become endangered with declining populations.

== Human uses ==
Fisheries around the world catch Zebrias, which are marketed frozen, fresh, and dried-salted.
