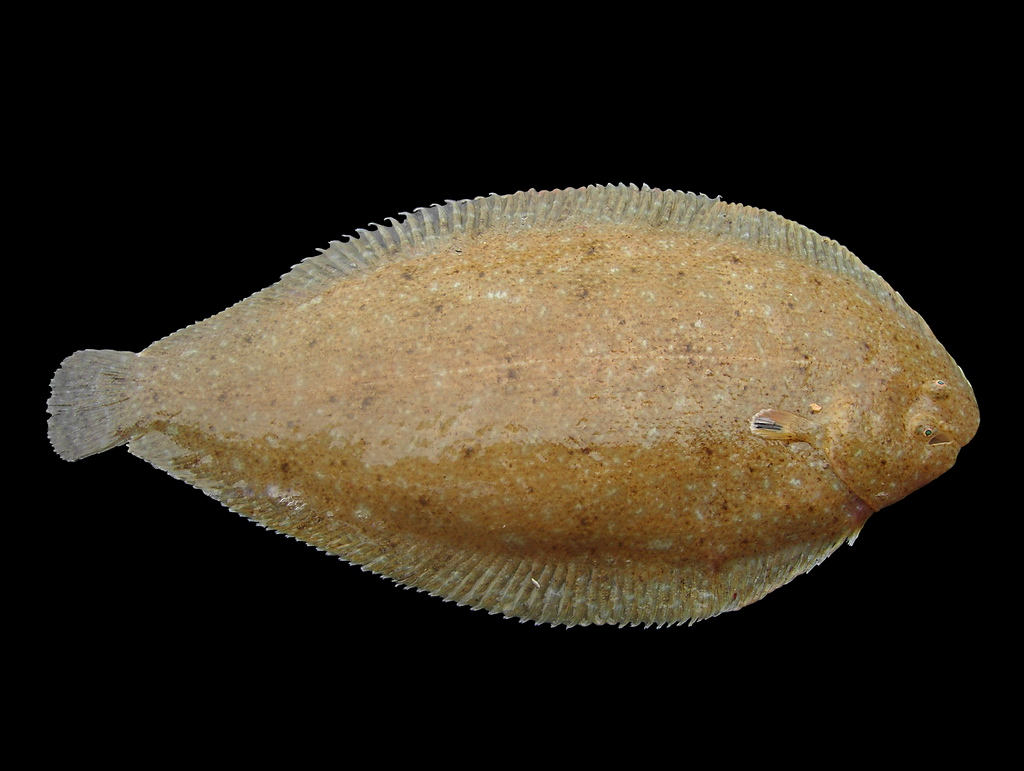
- Sand sole, Pegusa lascaris

Scientific classification
- Kingdom: Animalia
- Phylum: Chordata
- Class: Actinopterygii
- Order: Carangiformes
- Suborder: Pleuronectoidei
- Family: Soleidae; Bonaparte, 1832

Genera
- See text

= Soleidae =

Soles Temporal range: Ypresian–present

Family of fishes

The true soles are a family, Soleidae, of flatfishes. It includes saltwater and brackish water species in the East Atlantic, Indian Ocean, West and Central Pacific Ocean, and the Mediterranean sea. Freshwater species are found in Africa, southern Asia, New Guinea, and Australia. Many soles are important food species: the common sole, Solea solea, is popular in northern Europe and the Mediterranean.

== Taxonomy ==
In the past, soles of the Americas (both fresh and salt water) were included in this family, but they have been separated to their own family, the American soles (Achiridae). The only true sole remaining in that region is Aseraggodes herrei of the Galápagos and Cocos Island.

=== Classification ===
The following genera are placed in this family:

- Achiroides
- Aesopia
- Aseraggodes
- Austroglossus
- Barnardichthys
- Bathysolea
- Brachirus
- Buglossidium
- Dagetichthys
- Dexillus
- Dicologlossa
- Heteromycteris
- Leptachirus
- Liachirus
- Microchirus
- Monochirus
- Paradicula
- Pardachirus
- Pegusa
- Phyllichthys
- Pseudaesopia
- Rendahlia
- Rhinosolea
- Solea
- Soleichthys
- Synaptura
- Synapturichthys
- Synclidopus
- Typhlachirus
- Vanstraelenia
- Zebrias

=== Evolution ===
The earliest known fossil remains of soles are indeterminate otoliths from the Early Eocene-aged London Clay. During the Middle Eocene (Lutetian), the first fossil skeletons of soles are known in Eobuglossus and Turahbuglossus from Egypt. Other fossil soles include †Oligosolea Kovalchuk et al., 2025 from the Early Oligocene of Poland, and †Parasolea Schwarzhans et al., 2017 from the Middle Miocene of Croatia.

== Ecology ==
The true soles are bottom-dwelling fishes feeding on small crustaceans and other invertebrates. The family contains 30 genera and a total of about 180 species.

A flatfish resembling a small halibut or sole was observed by the bathyscaphe Trieste at the bottom of the Mariana Trench at a depth around 11 km (36,000 ft). This observation has been questioned by fish experts, and recent authorities do not recognize it as valid.

== Life history ==
Soles begin life as bilaterally symmetric larvae, with an eye on each side of the head, but during development, the left eye moves around onto the right side of the head. Adult soles lie on their left (blind) sides on the sea floor, often covered in mud, which in combination with their dark colours, makes them hard to spot.

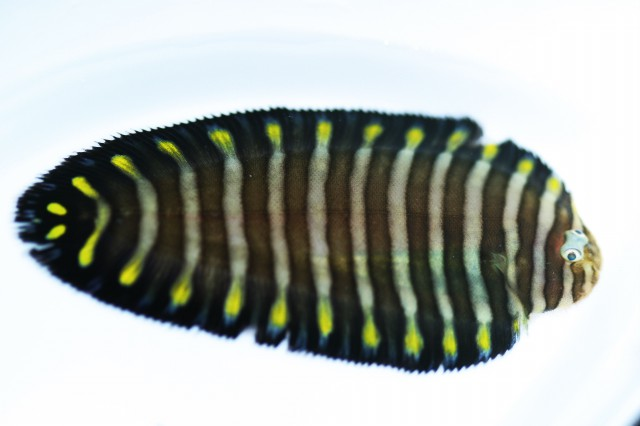
Unicorn sole, Aesopia cornuta

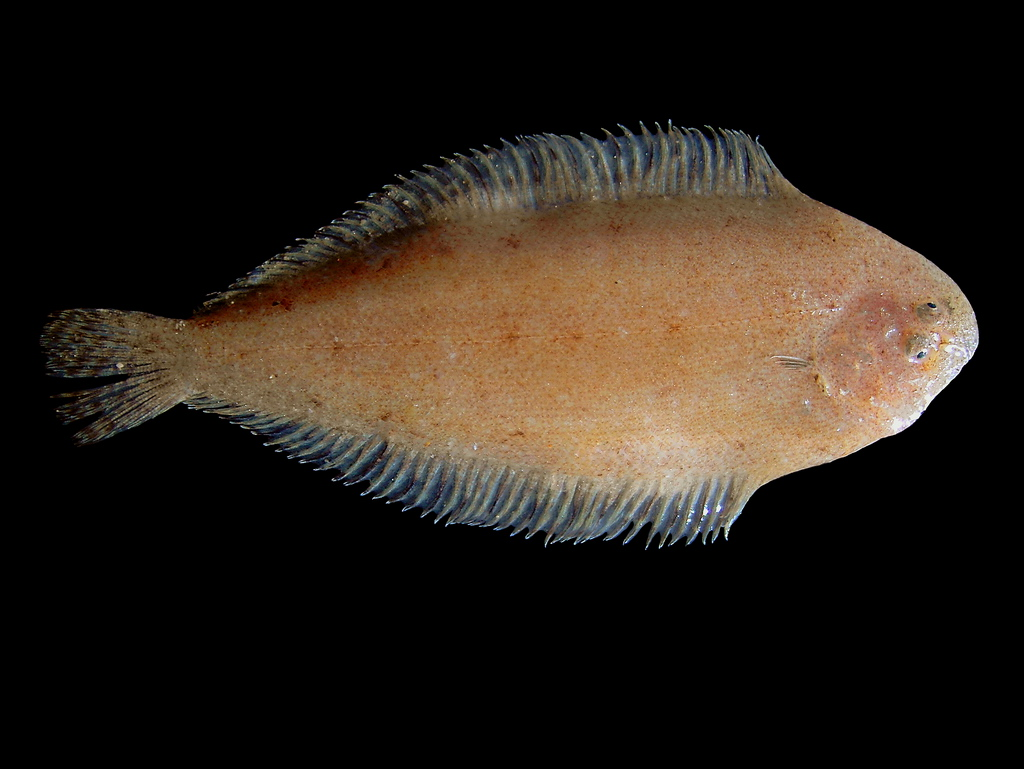
Solenette, Buglossidium luteum

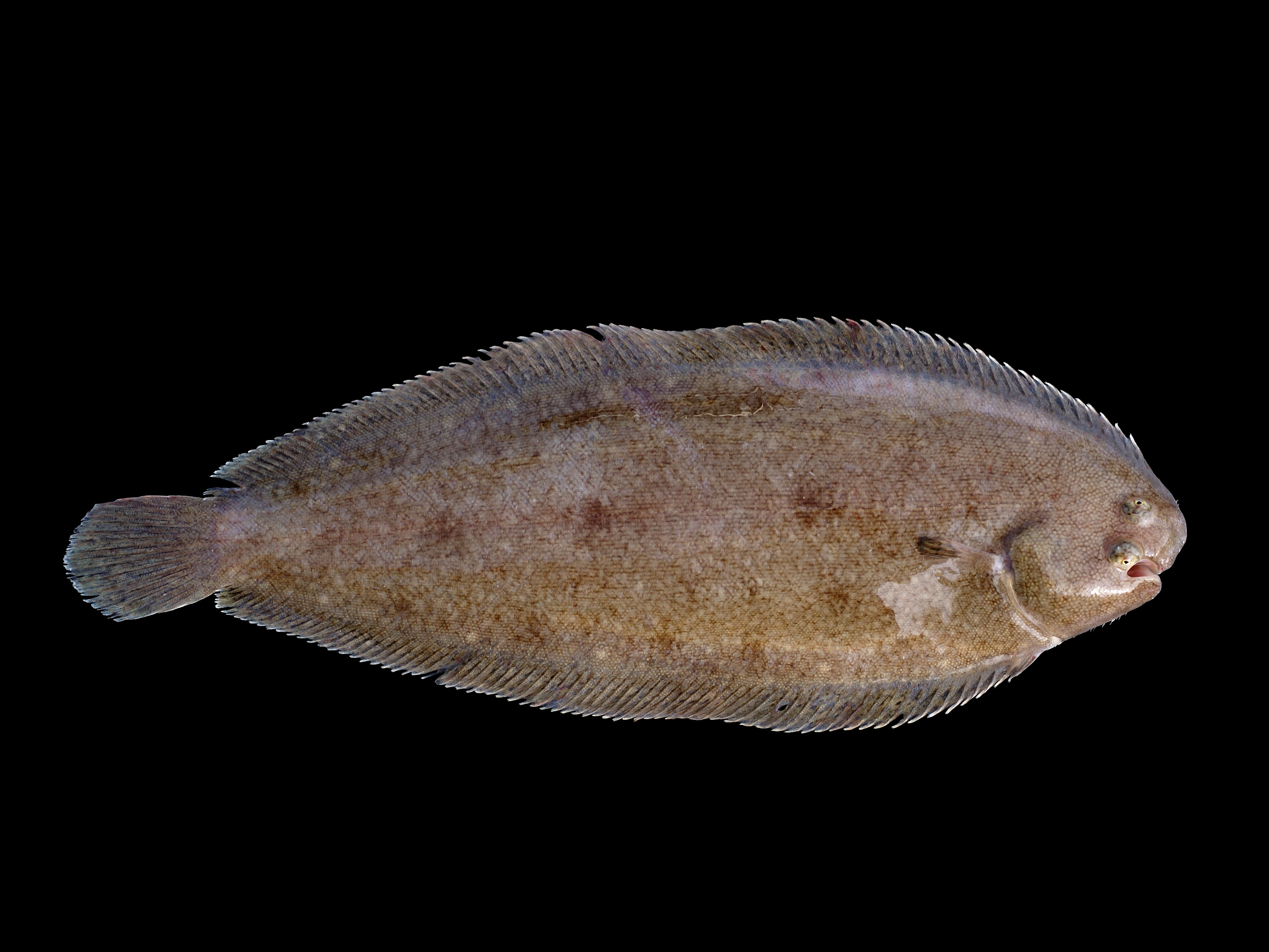
Common sole, Solea solea

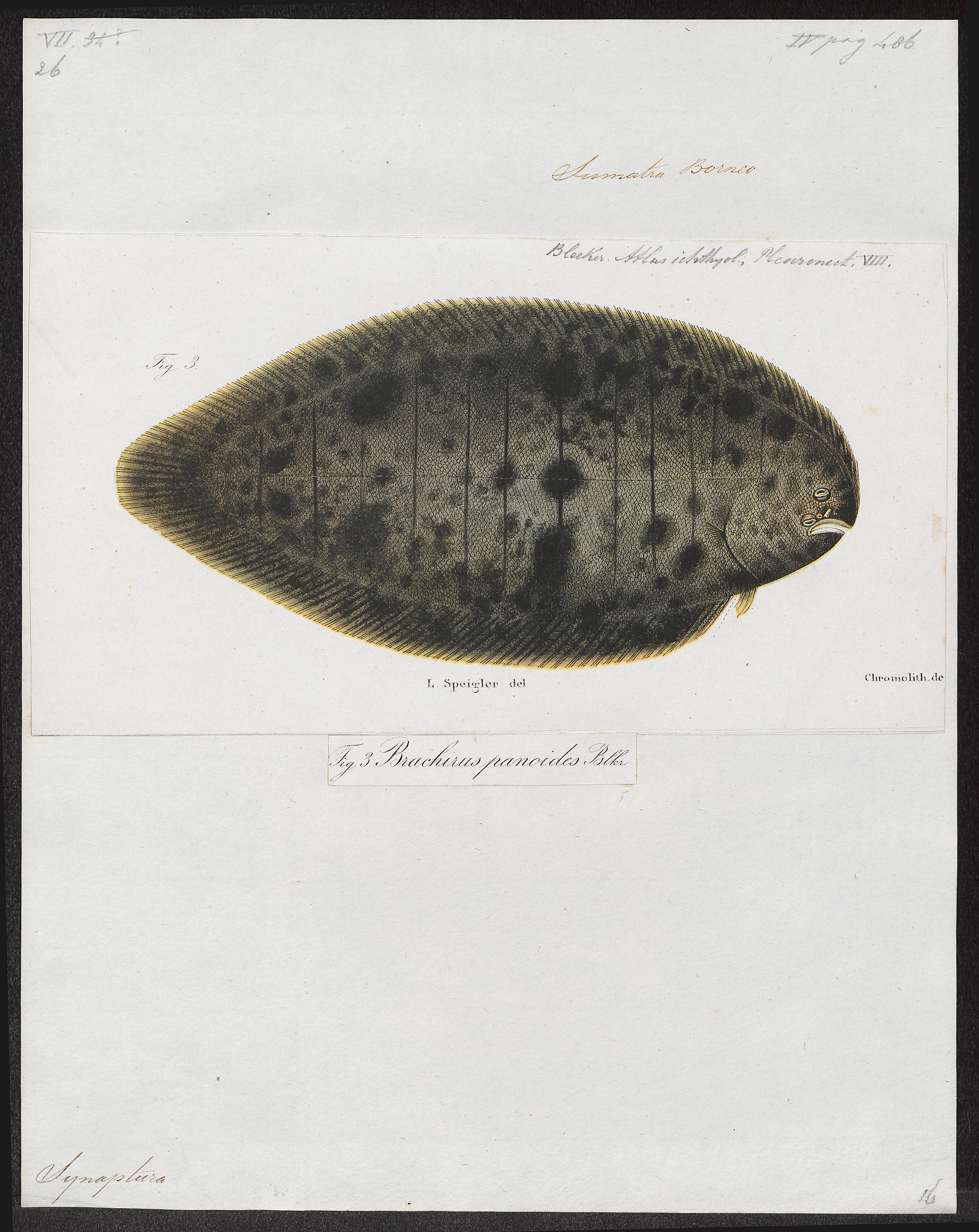
Freshwater sole, Brachirus panoides
