= Paul Chabanaud =

French ichthyologist and herpetologist (1876–1959)

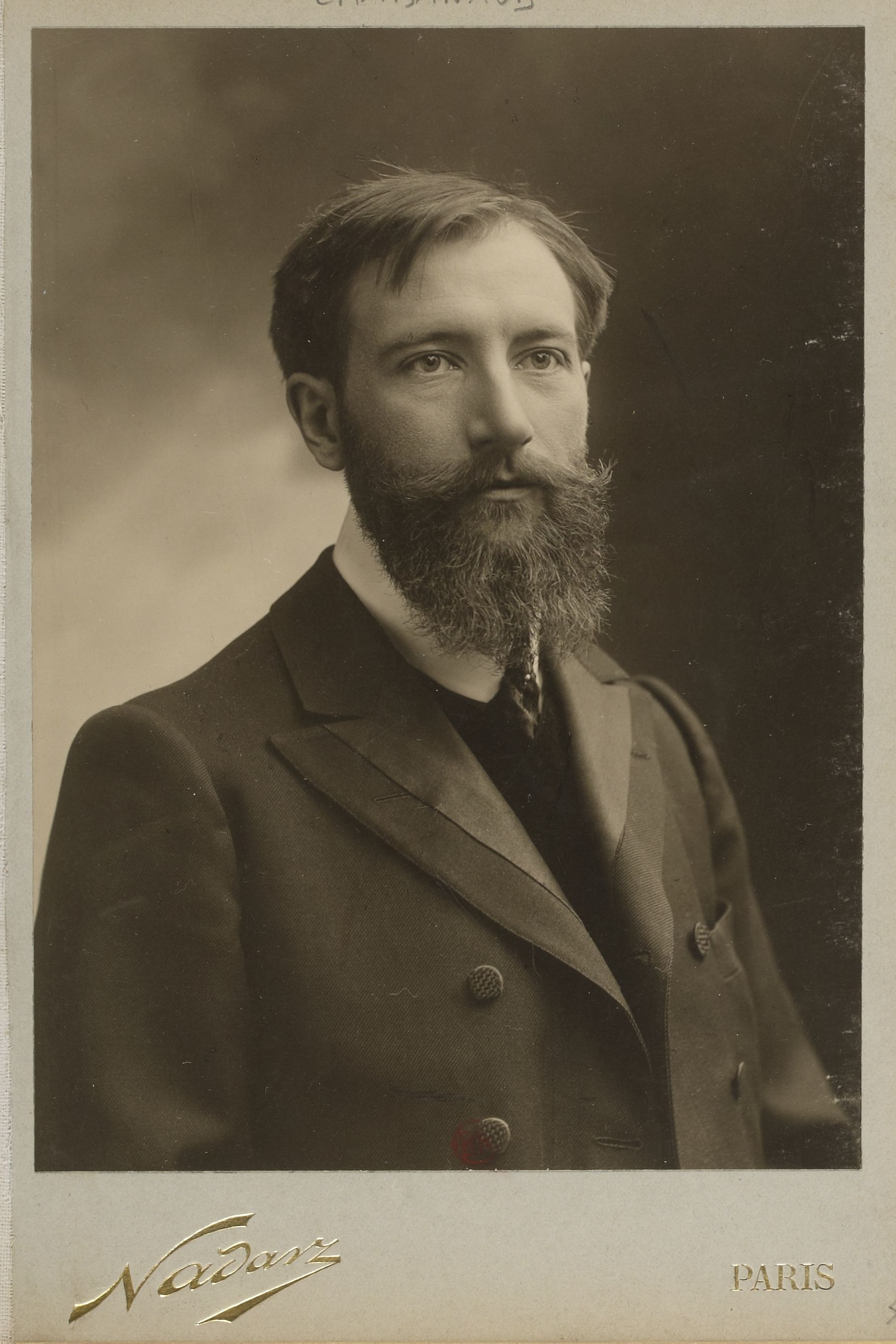
Paul Chabanaud

Paul Chabanaud (30 November 1876, in Versailles – 27 February 1959) was a French ichthyologist and herpetologist.

Beginning in 1915, he worked as a volunteer under zoologist Louis Roule at the Muséum National d'Histoire Naturelle in Paris. In 1919–1920, he undertook a scientific expedition to French West Africa (Senegal, Guinea) on behalf of the museum, during which he collected thousands of zoological specimens. Following his return to Paris, he served as a preparator in the laboratory of biologist Jean Abel Gruvel at the museum. He specialized in the anatomy and systematics of the flatfish (order Pleuronectiformes) and was the taxonomic authority of many herpetological and ichthyological species.

== Eponymy ==
The skink genus Chabanaudia is named after him, being circumscribed by Gaston-François de Witte and Raymond Ferdinand Laurent in 1943. His name is also associated with numerous zoological species, including:

- The catfish species, Atopochilus chabanaudi, circumscribed by Jacques Pellegrin in 1938.
- Chabanaud's fringe-fingered lizard, Acanthodactylus boueti, described by Chabanaud in 1917.
- Chabanaud's mabuya, Trachylepis breviparietalis, described by Chabanaud in 1917.
- The reed frog species, Hyperolius chabanaudi (synonym Hyperolius phantasticus), circumscribed by Ernst Ahl in 1931.

== Selected works ==
- Reptiles et batraciens, 1922.
- Les soles de l'Atlantique Oriental Nord et des mers adjacentes, 1927.
- Observations morphologiques et remarques sur la systématique des poissons hétérosomes soléiformes, 1927.
- Les genres de poissons Hétérosomates, 1930.
- Poissons hétérosomes, 1933.
- Le neurocrâne osseux des téléostéens dyssymétriques après la métamorphose, 1936.
- Les téléostéens dyssymétriques du Mokattam inférieur de Tourah, 1937.
- Contribution à la morphologie et à la systématique des Téléostéens dyssymétriques, 1938.
- Contribution à la morphologie du tube digestif des téléostéens dyssymétriques, 1947.

== Taxa described by him ==
- See Category:Taxa named by Paul Chabanaud
