= Mokattam Formation =

Geologic formation in Egypt

- Stratigraphic range: Middle Eocene (Late Lutetian to Bartonian)
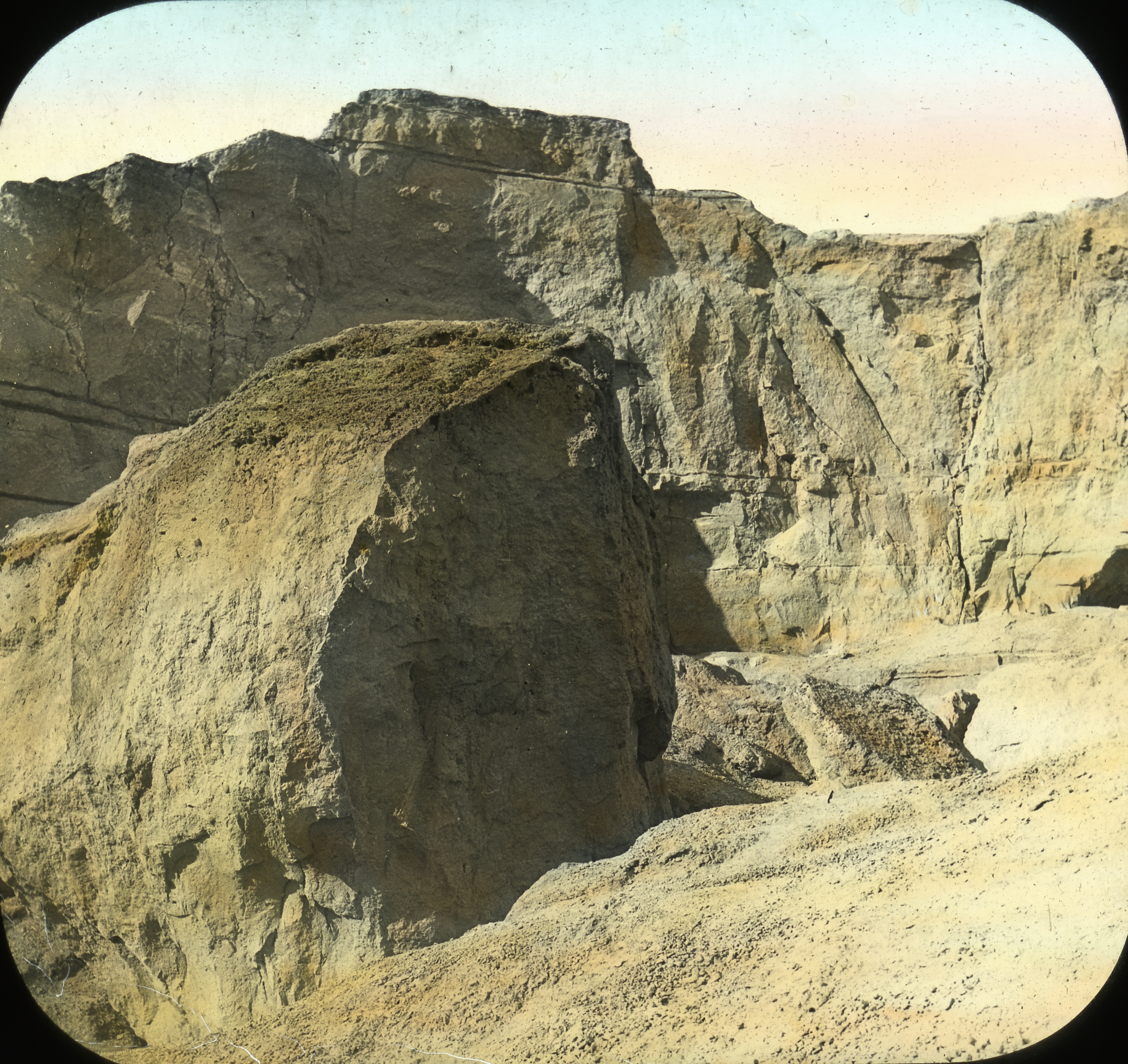
- A limestone quarry in the Mokattam Hills
- Type: Sedimentary
- Sub-units: Building Stone Member, Giushi Member
- Underlies: Maadi Formation
- Overlies: Minia Formation

Lithology
- Primary: Limestone

Location
- Coordinates: 30.0°N 31.3°E
- Approximate paleocoordinates: 17.1°N 33.0°E
- Country: Egypt

Type section
- Named for: Mokattam Hills
- Mokattam Formation (Egypt)

The Mokattam Formation is a Middle Eocene-aged geological formation in northern Egypt. Consisting of nummulitic marine limestone outcropping across the Mokattam Hills, it has been extensively quarried from Ancient Egypt to the present day, and represents the source material for most of the famous archeological sites of Greater Cairo, most notably the Giza pyramid complex, the Great Sphinx, and much of Historic Cairo.

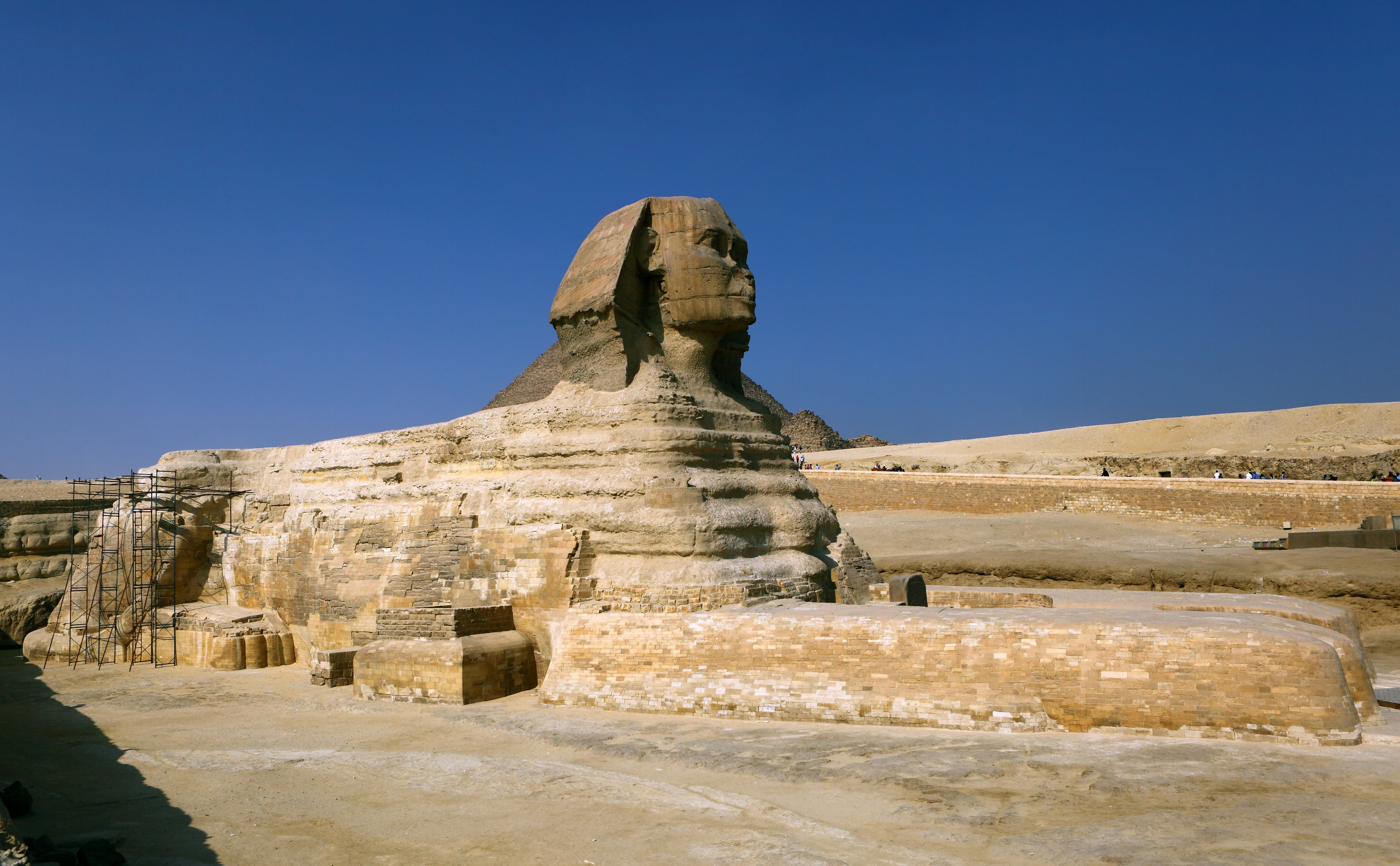
The Great Sphinx was carved entirely out of the Mokattam Formation

The age of the formation is thought to span from the late Lutetian to the Bartonian, depending on the member (Building Stone or Giushi). However, some authors treat the Giushi Member as its own geologic formation, which would restrict the Mokattam to just the Lutetian.

Numerous fossil fishes are known from this formation. Sirenian bones have been reported. This formation is the type locality of the early whales Protocetus atavus, and the sirenians Eotheroides aegyptiacus and Protosiren fraasi.

== Paleobiota ==
=== Cartilaginous fish ===
Based on Leriche (1921):

Genus	Species	Member	Locality	Notes	Image
Galeocerdo	G. latidens		Gebel Mokattam	A relative of the tiger shark.	
Isurus	I. desori			A mako shark.	
Myliobatis	M. goniopleurus			An eagle ray.	
Nebrius	N. blanckenhorni			A relative of the tawny nurse shark.	
Otodus	O. obliquus			A megatooth shark.	
Physogaleus	P. alabamensis (=Galeocerdo aegyptiacus)			A ground shark.	

=== Bony fish ===
Genus	Species	Member	Locality	Material	Notes	Image
Arius	A. fraasi				A sea catfish.	
Blabe	B. crawleyi		Tura	Full specimen	A percomorph of uncertain affinities, possibly a serranid.	
Cylindracanthus	C. gigas			Spine	A ray-finned fish of uncertain affinities. Identified from the rocks of the Great Sphinx.	
Eobuglossus	E. eocenicus		Tura	Full specimen	A sole.	
Joleaudichthys	J. sadeki		Tura	Partial specimen	An early-diverging flatfish, potentially related to spiny turbots.	
Mylomyrus	M. frangens		Tura	Full specimen	An eel.	
"Perca" (Smerdis?)	"P." lorenti			Incomplete specimen	A percomorph of uncertain affinities.	
Pomadasys	P. sadeki (=Kemticthys sadeki)		Tura	Full specimen	A grunt.	
Pycnodus	P. mokattamensis			Tooth plate	A pycnodont.	
Trigonodon	T. laevis			Pharyngeal teeth	A wrasse, taxonomic assignment uncertain.	
Turahbuglossus	T. cuvillieri		Tura	Full specimen	A sole.	

=== Reptiles ===
Genus	Species	Member	Locality	Material	Notes	Image
Herugavialis	H. cairensis (=Tomistoma cairense)		Gebel Mokattam	Skull and skull fragments	A gavialoid crocodilian.	

=== Mammals ===
Genus	Species	Member	Locality	Material	Notes	Image
Eotheroides	E. aegyptiacus				A sirenian.	
Protocetus	P. atavus		Gebel Mokattam		A protocetid whale.	
Protosiren	P. fraasi		Gebel Mokattam		A sirenian.	
