= Sphyrna arambourgi =

Sphyrna arambourgi Temporal range: Miocene

Scientific classification
- Kingdom: Animalia
- Phylum: Chordata
- Class: Chondrichthyes
- Subclass: Elasmobranchii
- Division: Selachii
- Order: Carcharhiniformes
- Family: Sphyrnidae
- Genus: Sphyrna
- Species: †S. arambourgi

Binomial name
- †Sphyrna arambourgi (Cappeta, 1970)

Extinct species of shark

Sphyrna arambourgi is an extinct species of hammerhead shark that lived in Miocene period. It coexisted with Otodus megalodon, Physogaleus, Prionace glauca, undescribed Prionace sp., Carcharhinus sp., Galeocerdo mayumbensis in Burdigalian and Langhian and other species.
