= Joleaudichthys =

Joleaudichthys Temporal range: Lutetian

Scientific classification
- Kingdom: Animalia
- Phylum: Chordata
- Class: Actinopterygii
- Division: Teleostei
- Order: Carangiformes
- Suborder: Pleuronectoidei
- Family: †Joleaudichthyidae; Chabanaud, 1937
- Genus: †Joleaudichthys; Chabanaud, 1937
- Species: †J. sadeki

Binomial name
- †Joleaudichthys sadeki Chabanaud, 1937

Extinct genus of fishes

Joleaudichthys is an extinct genus of prehistoric marine flatfish that lived during the middle Eocene (late Lutetian) of Egypt. It contains a single species, J. sadeki, from the Mokattam Formation, where fossils were found in the ancient Tura quarry. It is the only member of the extinct family Joleaudichthyidae. Phylogenetic studies have recovered it as an early-diverging crown group flatfish, although they differ on whether it is the sister group to the Psettodidae (the most basal extant flatfish lineage) or only diverged from the other flatfishes after the Psettodidae did.

== See also ==
- Prehistoric fish
- List of prehistoric bony fish
