= Men's Al-Ahram International 2016 =

Al-Ahram International 2016
- 6th Men's Al-Ahram International

Details
- Event name: Al Ahram International 2016
- Location: Cairo, Egypt
- Venue: Giza Plateau
- Website www.squashsite.co.uk/alahram/

Men's Winner
- Category: International 100
- Prize money: $100,000
- Year: World Tour 2016

The Men's Al-Ahram International 2016 is the men's edition of the 2016 Al-Ahram International, which is a tournament of the PSA World Tour event International (Prize money : 100 000 $). The event took place in Cairo in Egypt from 19 to 23 September.

== Prize money and ranking points ==
For 2016, the prize purse was $100,000. The prize money and points breakdown is as follows:

Prize Money Al-Ahram International (2016)
Event	W	F	SF	QF	1R
Points (PSA)	1750	1150	700	430	250
Prize money	$17,575	$12,025	$7,860	$4,855	$2,775

== Seeds ==
1. (Egypt) Mohamed El Shorbagy
2. (Egypt) Omar Mosaad
3. (Egypt) Karim Abdel Gawad
4. (Egypt) Ali Farag
5. (Egypt) Tarek Momen
6. (Germany) Simon Rösner
7. (Egypt) Ramy Ashour
8. (Spain) Borja Golán

== Draw and results ==
First round
1	(Egypt) Mohamed El Shorbagy	9	11	11	11
(Australia) Cameron Pilley	11	7	9	8
WC	(Egypt) Youssef Soliman	1	11	4	10
6	(Germany) Simon Rösner	11	9	11	12
7	(Egypt) Ramy Ashour	11	5	11	11
Q	(Egypt) Omar Abdel Meguid	5	11	7	6
(Egypt) Fares Dessouky	6	9	6
4	(Egypt) Ali Farag	11	11	11
3	(Egypt) Karim Abdel Gawad	10	11	14	11
Q	(Scotland) Greg Lobban	12	8	12	8
Q	(Egypt) Mohammed Reda	4	5	3
5	(Egypt) Tarek Momen	11	11	11
8	(Spain) Borja Golán	12	8	11	10	6
(Egypt) Zahed Mohamed	10	11	5	12	11
Q	(Egypt) Karim Ali Fathy	4	6	6
2	(Egypt) Omar Mosaad	11	11	11

Quarter finals
1	(Egypt) Mohamed El Shorbagy	5	11	4	11	11
7	(Germany) Simon Rösner	11	8	11	6	5
7	(Egypt) Ramy Ashour	5	r
4	(Egypt) Ali Farag	6
3	(Egypt) Karim Abdel Gawad	11	11	11
5	(Egypt) Tarek Momen	5	4	6
(Egypt) Zahed Mohamed	2	11	9
2	(Egypt) Omar Mosaad	11	13	11

Semi finals
1	(Egypt) Mohamed El Shorbagy	11	7	9	12
4	(Egypt) Ali Farag	7	11	11	14
3	(Egypt) Karim Abdel Gawad	11	13	11
2	(Egypt) Omar Mosaad	8	11	9

Final
4	(Egypt) Ali Farag	4	7	5
3	(Egypt) Karim Abdel Gawad	11	11	11

== See also ==
- 2016 PSA World Tour
- Al-Ahram International
- Women's Al-Ahram International 2016
