= Tura, Egypt =

Limestone quarry in ancient Egypt

Tura طرة Coptic: ⲧⲣⲱⲁ
- District
- Hayy Tura
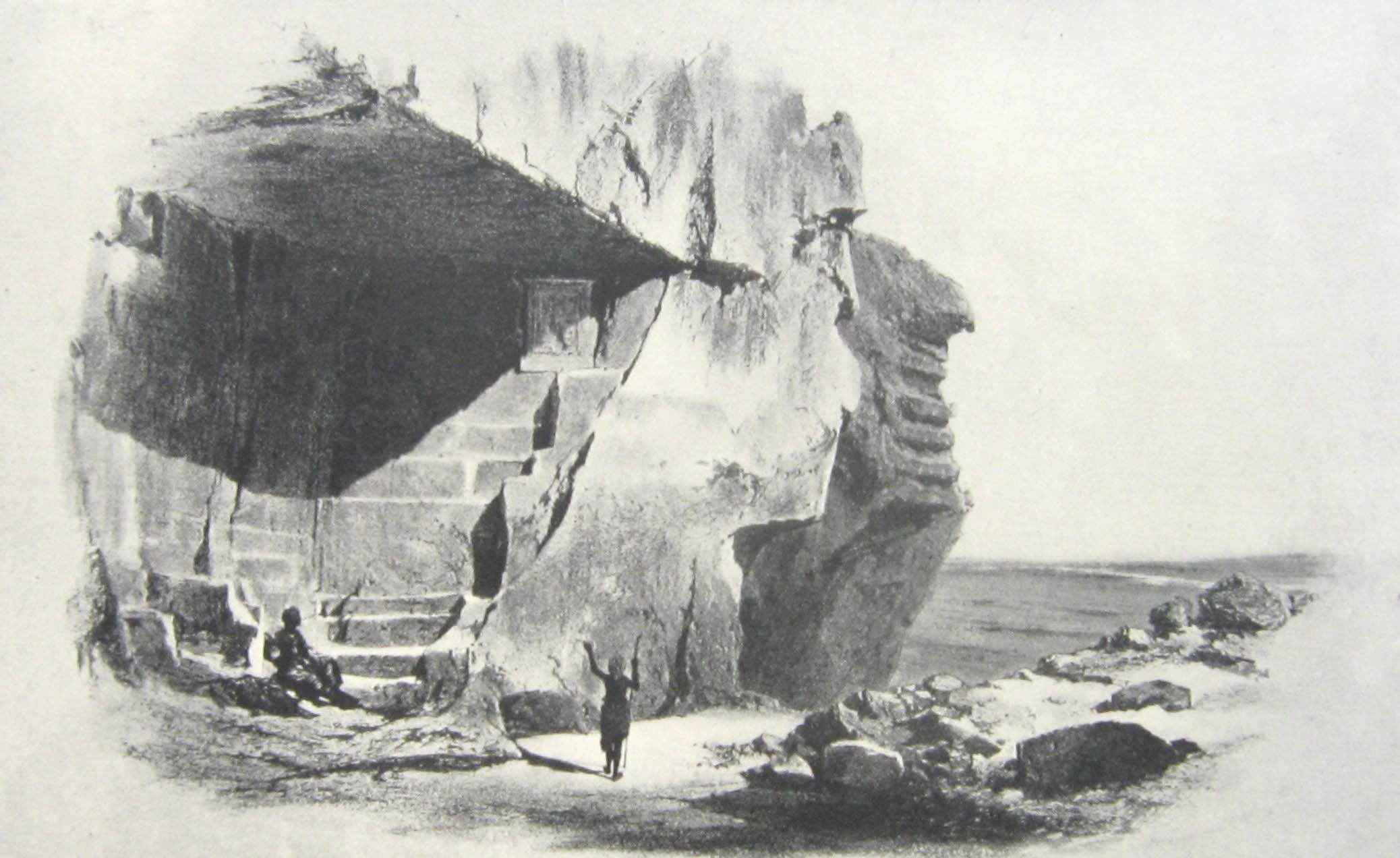
- Depiction of a limestone quarry in Tura

- Location in Egypt
- Coordinates: 29°56′45″N 31°19′05″E
- Country: Egypt
- Governorate: Cairo

Area
  - Total: 25 sq mi (65 km^{2})

Population (2023)
  - Total: 245,644
- Time zone: UTC+2 (EST)

Tura (Egyptian Arabic: طرة Tora IPA: [ˈtˤoɾˤɑ], Coptic: ⲧⲣⲱⲁ, Ancient Greek: Τρωια or Τρωη) was the primary quarry for limestone in ancient Egypt. The site, which was known by the ancient Egyptians as Troyu or Royu, is located about halfway between modern-day Cairo and Helwan. Its ancient Egyptian name was misinterpreted by the ancient Greek geographer Strabo, who thought it meant it was inhabited by Trojans, thus the Hellenistic city was named Troia. The site is located by the modern town of Tora in the Cairo Governorate.

The limestone from the quarry is thought to be part of the Mokattam Formation, which was deposited during the late Lutetian stage of the Eocene epoch, about 42 million years. Some fossil fish species have been described from the quarry.

== Ancient mining town ==
r Z1 Aw w N25
rꜣ-ꜣw
in hieroglyphs

The limestone from Tura was the finest and whitest of all the Egyptian quarries, so it was used for facing stones for the richest tombs, as well as for the floors and ceilings of mastabas, which were otherwise made of mudbrick. It was used during the Old Kingdom and was the source of the limestone used for the "Rhomboidal Pyramid" or Bent Pyramid of Sneferu, the Great Pyramid of Khufu, the sarcophagi of many Old Kingdom nobles, the pyramids of the Middle Kingdom, and certain temples of the New Kingdom built by at least Ahmose I, who may have used Tura limestone to begin the temple of Ptah at Memphis and the Southern Harem of Amun at Thebes.

The Tura limestone was deep underground and instead of open-pit mining, the quarrymen carved tunnels to cut large stones out, leaving some limestone behind to support the caverns left behind. These tunnels were surveyed by British Forces in 1941, and in quarry 35, workmen found many loose quires from books by Origen and Didymus the Blind, two Alexandrian Church Fathers. The workers who found them stole them, and although some were seized by the authorities, most are still missing, and turn up on the antiquities market from time to time. It is believed that some of the original books could have been up to 480 pages.

The caves were adapted by British forces during World War II, initially using them to store a variety of equipment, including munitions. In 1942, it was decided they would serve better as a bomb-proof location for the repair of aircraft engines by the Royal Air Force, and it was the engine repair section under 111 Maintenance Unit that was inspected on 22 August 1942 by Winston Churchill, who recorded that "Everything looked very smart and efficient on the spot, and an immense amount of work was being done day and night by masses of skilled men. But I had my tables of facts and figures and remained dissatisfied. The scale was far too small." The use of the caves for RAF aircraft engine repairs continued until 1945.

== Paleontology ==
Some fossil taxa of marine ray-finned fish have been described from the quarry, including two soles (Eobuglossus and Turahbuglossus), a grunt (Kemtichthys), an eel in the extinct genus Mylomyrus (Mylomyrus frangens), and an enigmatic scaleless percoid fish (Blabe). All these fish would have inhabited the oceans that covered the area during the Middle Eocene, between 48.6 and 37.2 million years ago.

== See also ==
- List of ancient Egyptian sites, including sites of temples
- List of types of limestone
