= Eobuglossus =

Eobuglossus Temporal range: Middle Eocene

Scientific classification
- Kingdom: Animalia
- Phylum: Chordata
- Class: Actinopterygii
- Order: Carangiformes
- Suborder: Pleuronectoidei
- Family: Soleidae
- Genus: †Eobuglossus; Chabanaud, 1931
- Species: †E. eocenicus

Binomial name
- †Eobuglossus eocenicus (Woodward, 1910)

Synonyms
- †Solea eocenica Woodward, 1910

Extinct genus of fishes

Eobuglossus (dawn Buglossus, referencing a synonym for the common sole) is an extinct genus of marine flatfish that lived during the Eocene. It contains a single known species, E. eocenicus, known from the late Lutetian-aged Mokattam Formation of Egypt, with its fossils recovered from the historically important Tura quarry.

It was initially described in the genus Solea before being moved to its own genus. Although it was placed in its own family (Eobuglossidae) when being reclassified, more recent taxonomic studies have confirmed it to be a true sole. Alongside Turahbuglossus from the same locality, it is one of the oldest true soles known from body fossils.

== See also ==
- Prehistoric fish
- List of prehistoric bony fish
