= Women's Al-Ahram International 2016 =

Al-Ahram International 2016
- 5th Women's Al-Ahram International

Details
- Event name: Al Ahram International 2016
- Location: Cairo, Egypt
- Venue: Giza Plateau
- Website www.squashsite.co.uk/alahram/

Men's Winner
- Category: International 100
- Prize money: $100,000
- Year: World Tour 2016

The Women's Al-Ahram International 2016 is the women's edition of the 2016 Al-Ahram International, which is a tournament of the PSA World Tour event International (Prize money : $100 000 ). The event will take place in Cairo in Egypt from 19 to 23 September.

== Prize money and ranking points ==
For 2016, the prize purse was $100,000. The prize money and points breakdown is as follows:

Prize Money Al-Ahram International (2016)
| Event | W | F | SF | QF | 1R |
| Points (PSA) | 1750 | 1150 | 700 | 430 | 250 |
| Prize money | $17,575 | $12,025 | $7,860 | $4,855 | $2,775 |

== Seeds ==
1. (Egypt) Nour El Sherbini
2. (Malaysia) Nicol David
3. (Egypt) Raneem El Weleily
4. (Egypt) Nouran Gohar
5. (France) Camille Serme
6. (Egypt) Omneya Abdel Kawy
7. (United States) Amanda Sobhy
8. (England) Alison Waters

== Draw and results ==
First round
1 | (Egypt) Nour El Sherbini | 11 | 11 | 11
Q | (Australia) Rachael Grinham | 7 | 4 | 4
Q | (Malaysia) Low Wee Wern | 8 | 3 | 16 | 12 | 6
6 | (Egypt) Omneya Abdel Kawy | 11 | 11 | 14 | 10 | 11
8 | (England) Alison Waters | 11 | 7 | 11 | 11
(England) Victoria Lust | 9 | 11 | 4 | 4
WC | (Egypt) Nour El Tayeb | 2 | 12 | 5 | 11 | 11
4 | (Egypt) Nouran Gohar | 11 | 10 | 11 | 6 | 7
3 | (Egypt) Raneem El Weleily | 11 | 11 | 11
(India) Joshna Chinappa | 8 | 2 | 7
Q | (Wales) Tesni Evans | 11 | 5 | 4 | 15 | 7
7 | (United States) Amanda Sobhy | 9 | 11 | 11 | 13 | 11
5 | (France) Camille Serme | 4 | 11 | 6 | 8
(England) Sarah-Jane Perry | 11 | 5 | 11 | 11
Q | (England) Fiona Moverley | 8 | 7 | 9
2 | (Malaysia) Nicol David | 11 | 11 | 11

Quarter finals
1 | (Egypt) Nour El Sherbini | 11 | 11 | 11
6 | (Egypt) Omneya Abdel Kawy | 1 | 4 | 8
8 | (England) Alison Waters | 6 | 6 | 13 | 14 | 8
WC | (Egypt) Nour El Tayeb | 11 | 11 | 11 | 12 | 11
3 | (Egypt) Raneem El Weleily | 11 | 4 | 11 | 11
7 | (United States) Amanda Sobhy | 9 | 11 | 6 | 3
(England) Sarah-Jane Perry | 11 | 3 | 4 | 11 | 11
2 | (Malaysia) Nicol David | 9 | 11 | 11 | 8 | 9

Semi finals
1 | (Egypt) Nour El Sherbini | 11 | 11 | 11
WC | (Egypt) Nour El Tayeb | 7 | 8 | 4
3 | (Egypt) Raneem El Weleily | 11 | 11 | 12
(England) Sarah-Jane Perry | 5 | 7 | 10

Final
1 | (Egypt) Nour El Sherbini | 5 | 9 | 11 | 11 | 7
3 | (Egypt) Raneem El Weleily | 11 | 11 | 9 | 9 | 11

== See also ==
- 2016 PSA World Tour
- Al-Ahram International
- Men's Al-Ahram International 2016
