= Al-Ahram International =

Details
- Event name: Al-Ahram International
- Location: Cairo Egypt
- Venue: Giza Plateau; Heliopolis Sporting Club

Men's Winner
- Category: International 100
- Most recent champion(s): (Egypt) Karim Abdel Gawad
- Current: Men's Al-Ahram International 2016

Women's Winner
- Category: International 100
- Most recent champion(s): (Egypt) Raneem El Weleily
- Current: Women's Al-Ahram International 2016

The Al-Ahram International is a men's squash tournament held in the Giza Plateau just in front of the pyramids in Cairo, Egypt. It is part of the PSA Super Series, the highest level of men's professional squash competition. The event was founded in 1996.

== Past results ==
=== Men's ===
Year	Champion	Runner-up	Score in final
1996	(Pakistan) Jansher Khan	(Egypt) Ahmed Barada	15–4, 15–11, 15–8
1997	(Scotland) Peter Nicol	(Pakistan) Jansher Khan	12–15, 15–14, 15–12, 15–11
1998	(Egypt) Ahmed Barada	(Australia) Martin Heath	15–5, 15–17, 15–13, 13–15, 15–1
1999	not held due to the 1999 World Open		
2000	(Scotland) Peter Nicol	(Egypt) Ahmed Barada	15–14, 9–15, 15–3, 15–12
2001	(England) Peter Nicol	(Canada) Jonathon Power	15–8, 17–15, 15–12
2002–2005	No competition		
2006	not held due to the 2006 World Open		
2007–2015	No competition		
2016	(Egypt) Karim Abdel Gawad	(Egypt) Ali Farag	11–4, 11–7, 11–5

=== Women's ===
Year	Champion	Runner-up	Score in final
1997	(Australia) Sarah Fitz-Gerald	(Australia) Michelle Martin	9–3, 9–3, 9–0
1998	(Australia) Michelle Martin	(England) Cassie Jackman	9–5, 9–3, 9–2
1999	not held due to the 1999 World Open		
2000	(New Zealand) Leilani Joyce	(New Zealand) Carol Owens	8–10, 9–7, 9–5, 3–9, 9–5
2001	(Australia) Sarah Fitz-Gerald	(England) Cassie Campion	9–3, 9–1, 9–1
2002–2015	No competition		
2016	(Egypt) Raneem El Weleily	(Egypt) Nour El Sherbini	11–5, 11–9, 9–11, 9–11, 11–7
