= Galeocerdo clarkensis =

Galeocerdo clarkensis Temporal range: Eocene

Scientific classification
- Domain: Eukaryota
- Kingdom: Animalia
- Phylum: Chordata
- Class: Chondrichthyes
- Subclass: Elasmobranchii
- Division: Selachii
- Order: Carcharhiniformes
- Family: Galeocerdonidae
- Genus: Galeocerdo
- Species: G. clarkensis

Binomial name
- Galeocerdo clarkensis E. I. White, 1956

Extinct species of shark

Galeocerdo clarkensis is an extinct relative of the modern tiger shark that lived in Eocene Alabama, Georgia, and Louisiana. Fossils have also been found in Mississippi. Six collections of fossils are known.
