= Sphyrna alleni =

Sphyrna alleni Temporal range: Late Miocene-recent 5.6–0 Ma

Conservation status
- CITES Appendix II

Scientific classification
- Kingdom: Animalia
- Phylum: Chordata
- Class: Chondrichthyes
- Subclass: Elasmobranchii
- Division: Selachii
- Order: Carcharhiniformes
- Family: Sphyrnidae
- Genus: Sphyrna
- Species: S. alleni

Binomial name
- Sphyrna alleni Gonzalez, Postaire, Driggers, Caballero, & Chapman, 2024
- Range of Sphyrnia alleni (in cyan) and related species

Species of shark

Sphyrna alleni, the shovelbill shark, is a species of hammerhead shark found along the West Atlantic coast from Belize to Brazil. Its pointed cephalofoil distinguishes it from the more northern bonnethead shark (Sphyrna tiburo), from which it was split in 2024. The species is also diagnosed by different tooth and precaudal vertebrae counts.

== Etymology ==
The species is named after Microsoft co-founder Paul Allen. The Paul G. Allen Family Foundation funded the research efforts that led to the discovery of the species. The common name of "shovelbill shark" corresponds to the name used for the shark in Belize, where the holotype was discovered.

== Discovery ==
A 2012 study of the mitochondrial gene NADH2 across elasmobranchs compared bonnethead shark specimens from the Gulf of Mexico and Trinidad, and found that the two groups clustered separately, and that Sphyrna tiburo was likely a species complex. The southern lineage was provisionally referred to as Sphyrna cf. tiburo, although the authors noted that imprecision in the type locality of S. tiburo could affect the nomenclature.

Between 2016 and 2019, twelve specimens of bonnethead sharks characterized by a pointed, shovel-shaped cephalofoil were captured by anglers in Belize and sent to researchers, who studied both the DNA and physical characteristics of the sharks. Prior to that, a 2015 study of bonnethead sharks in Panama had already found evidence of multiple species possibly existing. In 2021, analysis of populations from Southeastern Brazil connected them to the Caribbean lineage, although genetic differentiation indicated that declining Brazilian populations were not being replenished by Caribbean individuals.

== Description ==
Sphyrna alleni is a small species of shark, measuring less than 150 centimetres (4.9 ft) in length. Like other hammerhead sharks, its head is shaped into a flattened cephalofoil. The latter has a more angular anterior edge than that of S. tiburo, and bears lobes on its posterior edges, leading to it being described as "shovel-like". In males, the cephalofoil bears an additional bulge on its anterior side. The teeth are sharper and pointier than in S. tiburo. Individuals possess 80 to 83 precaudal vertebrae, around 10 more than in S. tiburo.

== Phylogeny ==
A 2016 molecular clock study placed the divergence between bonnethead shark lineages in Belize and North America around 3.61 to 5.62 Mya. Due to similarity in cephalofoil shapes between Sphyrna alleni and Sphyrna tiburo vespertina, it has been proposed that the two could represent sister lineages, having diverged from each other later following the closure of the Isthmus of Panama.

== Distribution and ecology ==
The species is distributed on the West Atlantic coast from Belize to Brazil. No geographical barrier separates it from the bonnethead shark further north, and a contact zone has been proposed to range from Mexico to Belize.

Shovelbill sharks are predators.

== Conservation ==
As the populations of Sphyrna alleni are comparatively less well-managed than those of S. tiburo further north, the former has been described by its discoverers as "warrant[ing] a highly threatened status". Threats included overfishing, with the shark being frequently caught by anglers. Actions taken by Belize to limit the threat to shark populations, such as a ban on gillnets and the establishment of protected areas, have been stated by Demian Chapman to potentially help the species.
