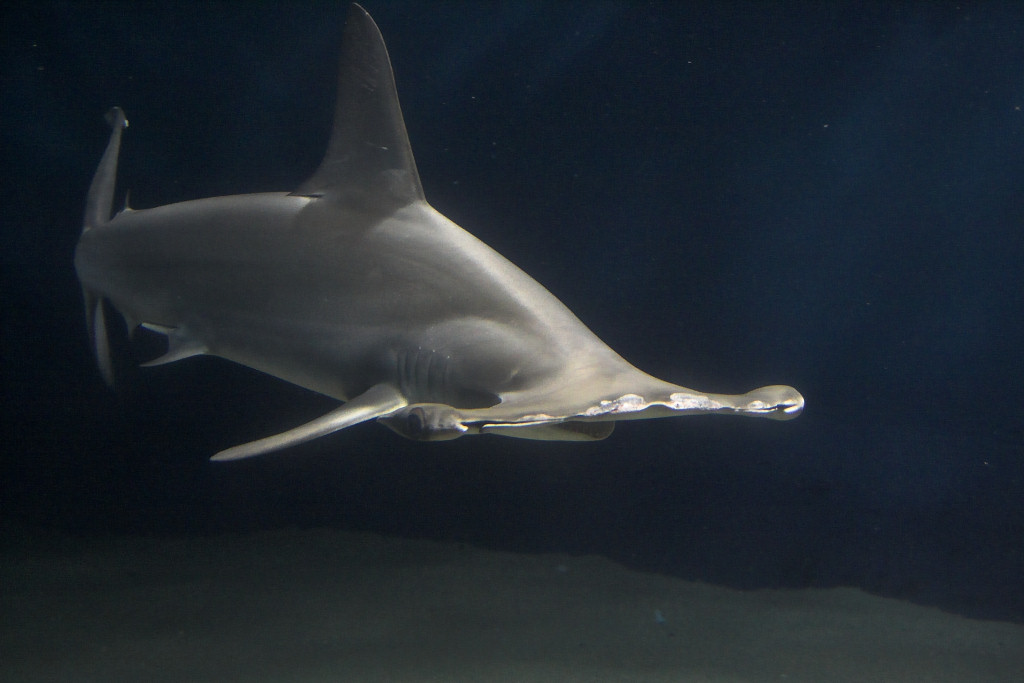
- Great hammerhead (S. mokarran)

Scientific classification
- Kingdom: Animalia
- Phylum: Chordata
- Class: Chondrichthyes
- Subclass: Elasmobranchii
- Division: Selachii
- Order: Carcharhiniformes
- Family: Sphyrnidae
- Genus: Sphyrna; Rafinesque, 1810

Type species
- Squalus zygaena Linnaeus, 1758

Synonyms
- Cestraciom Walbaum, 1792; Cestracion Klein, 1776; Cestracion T. N. Gill, 1862; Cestracion J. D. Ogilby, 1916; Cestrorhinus Blainville, 1816; Mesozygaena Compagno, 1988; Platysqualus Swainson, 1839; Reniceps T. N. Gill, 1862; Sphyra Van der Hoeven, 1855; Sphyrichthys Thienemann, 1828; Sphyrnias Rafinesque, 1815; Zygaena G. Cuvier, 1816; Zygana Swainson, 1838; Zygoena A. Risso, 1827

= Sphyrna =

Sphyrna Temporal range: Bartonian–present

Genus of sharks

Sphyrna is a genus of hammerhead sharks with a cosmopolitan distribution in the world's oceans. Members of Sphyrna have a tendency to inhabit coastal waters along the intertidal zone rather than the open ocean, as their prey such as invertebrates, fish, rays, small crustaceans, and other benthic organisms hide in the sands and sediment along these zones. Members of Sphyrna are also known by synonyms such as Zygaena, Cestracion, and Sphyrichthys. The earliest species described of this genus was Sphyrna zygaena by Carl Linnaeus in 1758, while the latest described member, Sphyrna alleni, was described in 2024.

The genus name comes from the Greek word σφῦρα sphyra "hammer", it is also where the family name Sphyrnidae comes from.

The earliest known fossil species of Sphyrna is †Sphyrna guinoti from the mid-late Eocene of Tunisia and Egypt.

== Species ==
The recognized species in this genus are:

Extant

- Sphyrna alleni Gonzalez, Postaire, Driggers, Caballero, & Chapman, 2024 (shovelbill shark)
- Sphyrna corona (S. Springer, 1940) (scalloped bonnethead)
- Sphyrna gilberti Quattro, Driggers, Grady, Ulrich & M. A. Roberts, 2013 (Carolina hammerhead)
- Sphyrna lewini (E. Griffith & C. H. Smith, 1834) (scalloped hammerhead)
- Sphyrna media (S. Springer, 1940) (scoophead)
- Sphyrna mokarran (Rüppell, 1837) (great hammerhead)
- Sphyrna tiburo (Linnaeus, 1758) (bonnethead)
- Sphyrna tudes (Valenciennes, 1822) (smalleye hammerhead)
- Sphyrna vespertina (S. Springer, 1940) (pacific bonnethead)
- Sphyrna zygaena (Linnaeus, 1758) (smooth hammerhead)

Extinct

- † Sphyrna arambourgi (Cappetta, 1970)
- † Sphyrna gibbesii (Hay, 1902)
- † Sphyrna guinoti Adnet et al., 2020
- † Sphyrna integra (Probst, 1878)
- † Sphyrna laevissima (Cope, 1867) (likely synonymous with S. zygaena)
- † Sphyrna magna (Cope, 1867)
