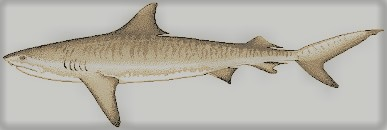
- Life restoration of Galeocerdo alabamensis

Scientific classification
- Domain: Eukaryota
- Kingdom: Animalia
- Phylum: Chordata
- Class: Chondrichthyes
- Subclass: Elasmobranchii
- Division: Selachii
- Order: Carcharhiniformes
- Family: Galeocerdonidae
- Genus: Galeocerdo
- Species: G. alabamensis

Binomial name
- Galeocerdo alabamensis Leriche, 1942

= Galeocerdo alabamensis =

Galeocerdo alabamensis Temporal range: 37.2–33.9 Ma

Extinct species of shark

Galeocerdo alabamensis is an extinct relative of the modern tiger shark. Nomenclature of this shark has been debated, and recent literature identified it more closely with the Physogaleus genus of prehistoric shark, rather than Galeocerdo. The classification of Physogaleus is known as tiger-like sharks while Galeocerdo refers to tiger sharks. In 2003, P. alabamensis was classified as Galeocerdo. However, in 2019, they were proclaimed to be more morphologically similar to the genus Physogaleus. This definition was based primarily on tooth shape, as the majority of information on P. alabamensis is a result of studying tooth fossils. Distinctions between Physogaleus and Galeocerdo are difficult with extinct sharks from the Oilgocene/Miocene as there is little paleobiological information allowing for hard conclusions.

== Distribution ==
Referred to in this article as P. alabamensis, fossils have been recovered in the Southern United States, specifically in Alabama, Arkansas, and Louisiana. P. alabamensis existed during the Eocene Epoch alongside many other similar extant species. During the Eocene, tiger sharks began appearing in fossil records. Since then, many species of tiger shark have gone extinct, including P. alabamensis. G. cuvier is the only living species of tiger shark today. Identification and habits of P. alabamensis are often confused with taxonomically similar sharks existing in the same period because information about them is sparse and mostly limited to tooth fossils. The first recorded appearance of P. alabamensis was between 41.3 and 38.0 Ma and the last recorded appearance was between 37.2 and 33.9 Ma based on fossil distribution.

== Taxonomy ==
Recovered teeth and fossils provide the majority of existing knowledge about P. alabamensis. Other information can be extrapolated from sister species to P. alabamensis also existing exclusively in the Eocene Epoch. P. alabamensis is likely a predecessor to G. aduncas. Consequently, P. contortus, G. casei, G. davisi, G. gajensis, and G. paulinoi are morphologically similar extant species. These sister species presumably exhibit similar niches to P. alabamensis. P. contortus and G. aduncas experienced sympatric distributions around the East Coast of the United States during the Miocene, nearly identical to P. alabamensis. Furthermore, based on tooth characteristics, it has been proposed that P. alabamensis is combined with G. argyptiacus.

== Diet and Tooth Fossil Shape ==
Based on the family, Carcharhiniformes, P. alambamensis exhibited a carnivorous diet. G. cuvier, the modern tiger shark, has larger, more robust teeth than P. alabamensis and its sister species. G. cuvier is known to have a versatile carnivorous diet from squid to sea turtles. The smaller tooth size of P. alabamensis as well as other Physogaleus and Galeocerdo from the Eocene, suggests a less versatile diet, likely targeting smaller prey. The most morphologically similar teeth to P. alabamensis are found in Hemipristis and P. contours. Based on the diet of sand-tiger sharks and tooth shape, P. alabamensis probably had a diet consisting of bony fish. P alabamensis and P. contours teeth have a slender and twisted crown with fine serrations on the mesial and distal sides as well as larger serrations on the distal shoulder. This also indicates predation of small bony fish and other, small cartilaginous fishes such as rays because such crowns are ideal for grasping prey. As the tiger shark lineage evolved, tooth size increased greatly, indicating consumption of larger prey and possibly more aggressive feeding tactics.

== Reproduction ==
As a member of the Carcharhinidae family, P. alabamensis exhibits seasonal sexual reproduction. Consequently, as ancestor to G. cuvier, it can be inferred that P. alabamensis reproduced in the same manner. G. cuvier has ovoviviparous reproductive strategies, giving birth to live young and producing anywhere from 3 to 57 offspring and caring attentively for 15 to 16 months. This is inferential because research has not been established regarding the reproductive strategies of many of Physogaleus.
