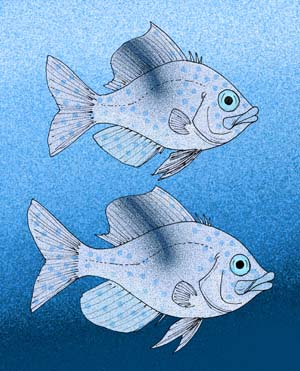
- Artist's reconstruction

Scientific classification
- Kingdom: Animalia
- Phylum: Chordata
- Class: Actinopterygii
- Order: Perciformes
- Family: Serranidae (?)
- Genus: †Blabe; White, 1936
- Species: †B. crawleyi

Binomial name
- †Blabe crawleyi White, 1936

= Blabe =

Blabe Temporal range: Middle Eocene

Small, extinct prehistoric bony fish probably in the family Serranidae

Blabe is an extinct genus of small, prehistoric ray-finned fish probably belonging to the family Serranidae that lived during the middle division of the Eocene epoch of Egypt. It has a single known species, B. crawleyi, known from the Upper Lutetian Mokattam Formation limestone of the ancient Tura quarry.

The generic name translates as "nuisance," referring to how the lack of scales on the type specimen frustrated its describer's attempts to understand the fish's exact systemic position. The specific name commemorates one Cecil Crawley, who discovered the first specimen.

== See also ==
- Prehistoric fish
- List of prehistoric bony fish
