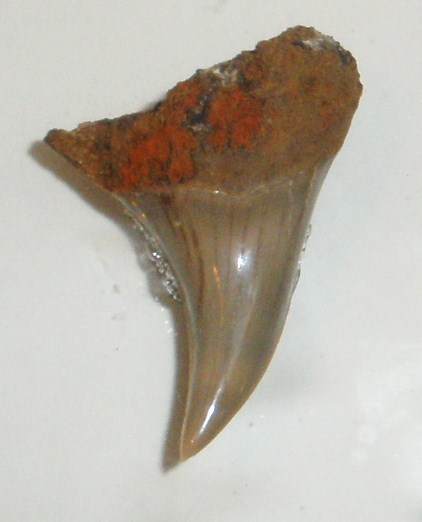
- Tooth of G. latidens in the Naturalis Biodiversity Center, in Leiden.

Scientific classification
- Kingdom: Animalia
- Phylum: Chordata
- Class: Chondrichthyes
- Subclass: Elasmobranchii
- Division: Selachii
- Order: Carcharhiniformes
- Family: Galeocerdonidae
- Genus: Galeocerdo
- Species: †G. latidens

Binomial name
- †Galeocerdo latidens (Agassiz, 1835)

Synonyms
- Galeus latidens Agassiz, 1835

= Galeocerdo latidens =

Galeocerdo latidens Temporal range: Paleocene-Middle miocene 59.2–11.608 Ma

Extinct species of shark

Galeocerdo latidens is extinct species of tiger shark, that lived during the Paleocene and Middle Miocene periods, from 59.2 to 11.608 million years ago. The species lived in North America, Europe, Africa, and Russia.

== Taxonomy ==
G. latidens was first described by Louis Agassiz in 1835. Due to similarities in morphology, some authors have suggested synonymising G. latidens and Galeocerdo eaglesomei. Although the latter name was described later, it has been suggested to treat G. latidens as a nomen dubium since neither the locality nor the horizon are known.
