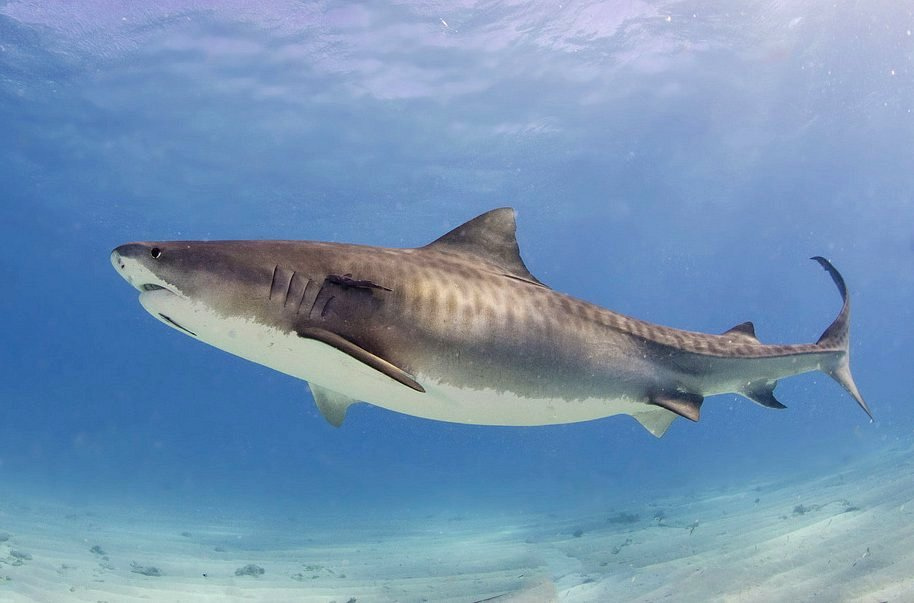
- Galeocerdo cuvier

Scientific classification
- Kingdom: Animalia
- Phylum: Chordata
- Class: Chondrichthyes
- Subclass: Elasmobranchii
- Division: Selachii
- Order: Carcharhiniformes
- Family: Galeocerdonidae
- Genus: Galeocerdo; J. P. Müller & Henle, 1837

Type species
- Squalus tigrinus

Species
- See text

= Galeocerdo =

Galeocerdo Temporal range: Eocene–Present

Genus of sharks

Galeocerdo is a genus of ground shark. Only a single species, G. cuvier, the tiger shark, is extant. The earliest fossils date back to the early Eocene epoch, (Ypresian), around 56–47.8 Million years ago. While historically considered a member of the requiem shark family Carcharhinidae, it is currently considered to be the only member of the family Galeocerdonidae. While this genus was historically considered diverse, including 21 extinct species, morphometric analysis conducted in 2021 suggested that the diversity of the genus included only 5 extinct species (including the Eocene †G. clarkensis and †G. eaglesomei, Oligocene-late Miocene †G. aduncus, Miocene †G. mayumbensis, and Pliocene †G. capellinii) much lower than previously assumed. The oldest fossils of the extant G. cuvier date to the middle Miocene.

== Species ==
Species historically considered valid in the genus Galeocerdo include:

- Galeocerdo cuvier
- †Galeocerdo aduncus
- †Galeocerdo alabamensis
- †Galeocerdo clarkensis
- †Galeocerdo denticulatus
- †Galeocerdo eaglesomi
- †Galeocerdo gibberulus
- †Galeocerdo latidens
- †Galeocerdo mayumbensis
- †Galeocerdo minor
- †Galeocerdo mixtus
- †Galeocerdo productus
