= Galeocerdo mayumbensis =

Galeocerdo mayumbensis Temporal range: Miocene

Scientific classification
- Kingdom: Animalia
- Phylum: Chordata
- Class: Chondrichthyes
- Subclass: Elasmobranchii
- Division: Selachii
- Order: Carcharhiniformes
- Family: Galeocerdonidae
- Genus: Galeocerdo
- Species: †G. mayumbensis

Binomial name
- †Galeocerdo mayumbensis (Darteville & Casier, 1943)

Synonyms
- List of synonyms: Carcharodon bigelowi (Mehrotra et al., 1973); Galeocerdo bigelowi Mehrotra et al., 1973; Galeocerdo casei Müller, 1999; Galeocerdo paulinoi (Santos & Travassos, 1960)

Extinct species of shark

Galeocerdo mayumbensis is an extinct species of tiger sharks that lived in the Miocene period. A relative of the tiger shark (Galeocerdo cuvier), it lived in North America, South America, mainland Africa and Madagascar. The teeth of G. mayumbensis are different from those of G. aduncus.

== Description ==
Galeocerdo mayumbensis probably reached the same size as G. artictus. Its teeth are tall and straight, and similar to those of G. latidens, being of the same height. Galeocerdo mayumbensis differs from G. aduncus by having concave rather than convex teeth. It lived alongside Megalodon.

== Diet ==
G. mayumbensis probably fed on fish, marine mammals, and sea turtles. He was a probably apex predator.

== Size ==
The G. mayumbensis was a probably large shark, compared to currently largest Tiger sharks individuals. Its size is based on large teeth and comparison with the modern Tiger shark (Galeocerdo cuvier).
