= Giza Plateau =

Site of the largest known collection of pyramids, in Egypt

Coordinates: 29°58′34″N 31°07′58″E

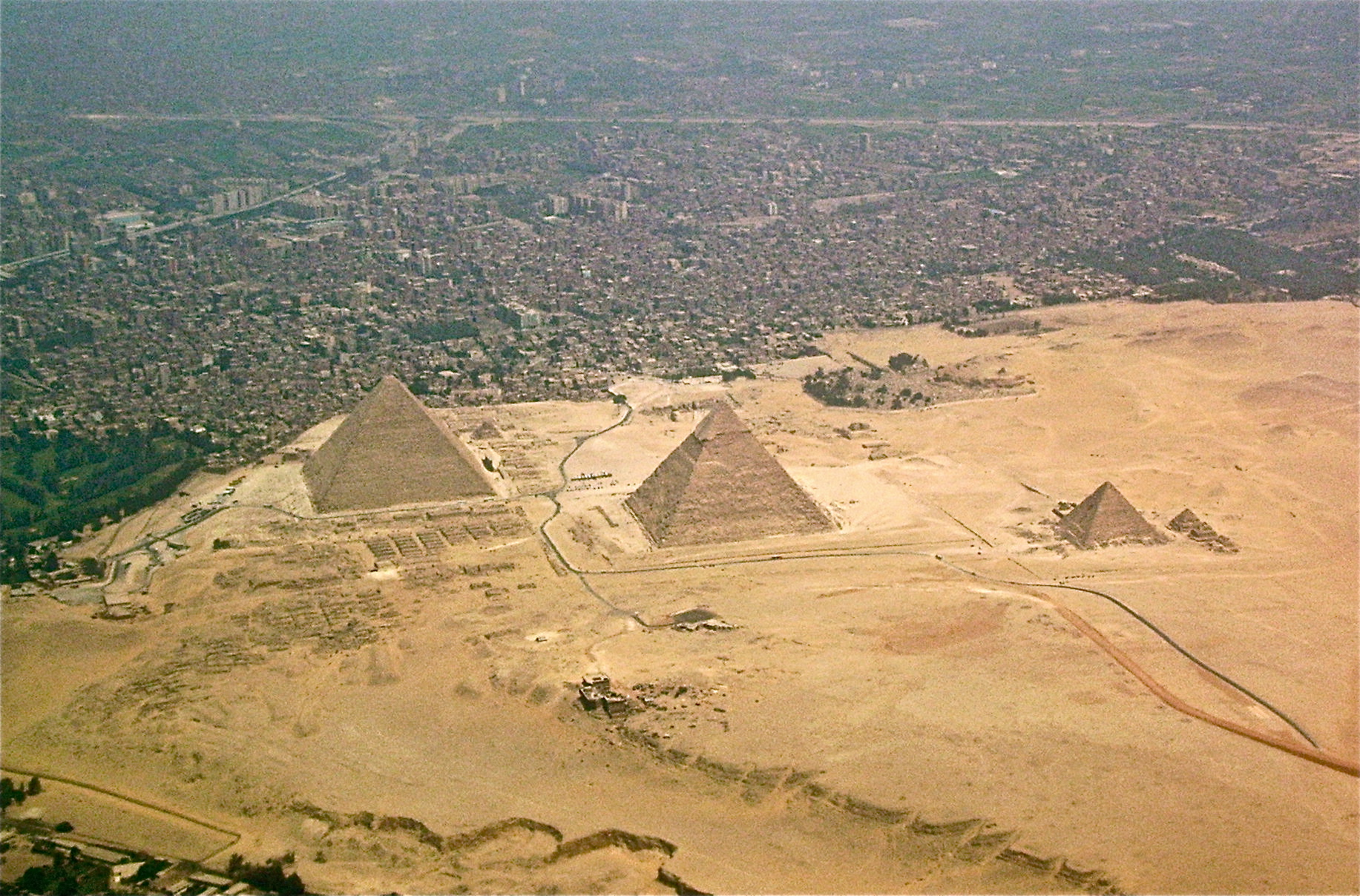
From north to south: parts of the city of Giza, the Giza Necropolis, and part of the Giza Plateau

The Giza Plateau (Arabic: هضبة الجيزة) is a limestone plateau in Giza, Egypt, the site of the Fourth Dynasty Giza pyramid complex, which includes the pyramids of Khufu, Khafre and Menkaure, the Great Sphinx, several cemeteries, a workers' village and an industrial complex. It forms the northernmost part of the 160 km^{2} (62 sq mi) Pyramid Fields in the Western Desert edge of the Nile Valley that are part of the UNESCO World Heritage Site, Memphis and its Necropolis.

The plateau is elevated approximately 60 metres (200 ft) above sea level.

== Geology ==
The Plateau is composed of the Middle Eocene-aged limestones of the Mokattam Formation, which were used to later construct the pyramids. The plateau's elevation over the surrounding region appears to originate from a major Early Pliocene-aged marine transgression potentially linked to the Zanclean flood, which eroded much of the surrounding rock and formed the steep escarpment. The cliffs of the Giza plateau would have overlooked an expanded Mediterranean Sea around this time.

== Pyramid complex and Great Sphinx ==
=== Giza pyramid complex ===
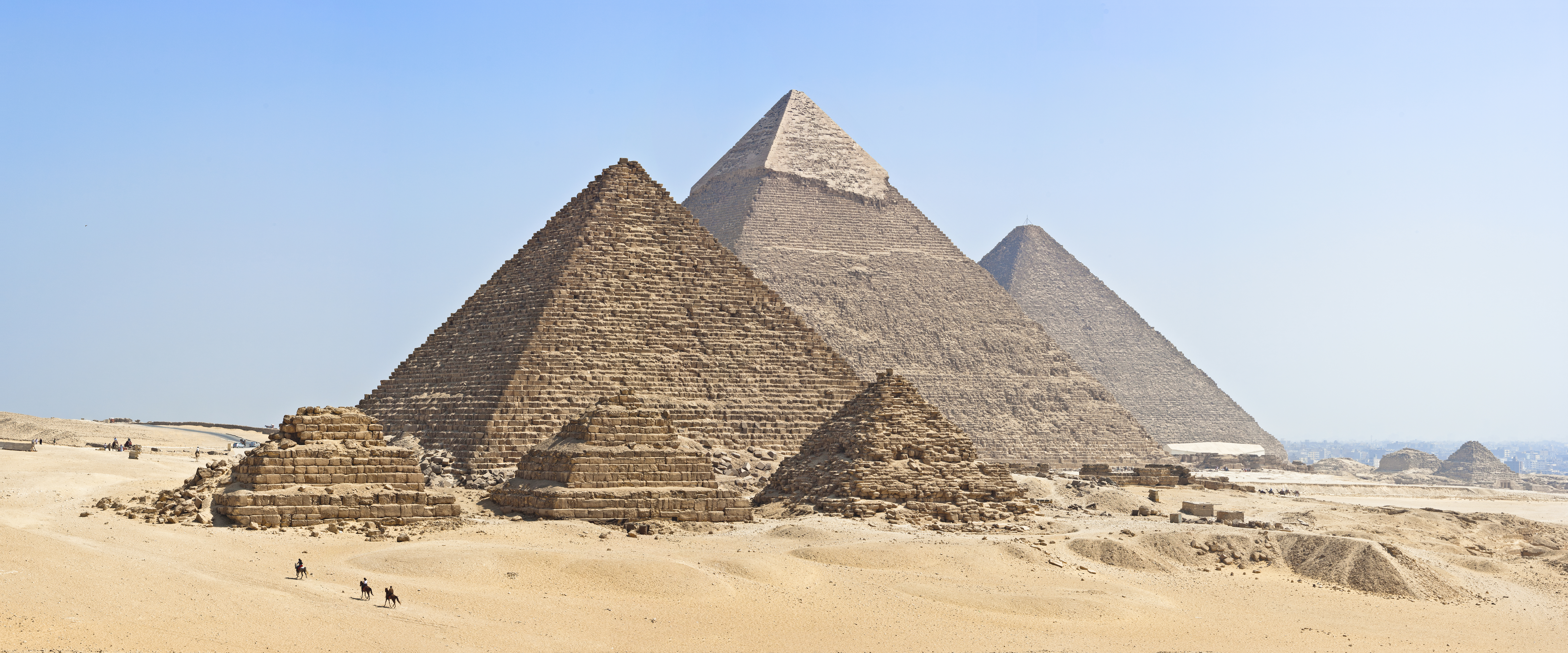
Pyramids of Giza

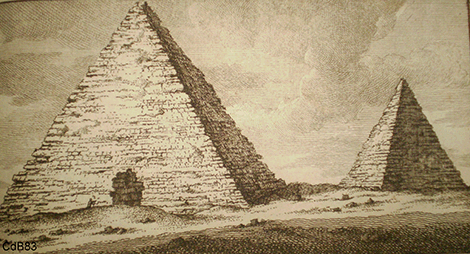
A sketch made by Dutch traveller Cornelis de Bruyn on his journey through Egypt in 1698.

The Giza pyramid complex (مجمع أهرامات الجيزة), also called the Giza necropolis and also known as the Pyramids of Giza or Egypt, is the site on the Giza Plateau in Giza, that includes the Great Pyramid of Giza, the Pyramid of Khafre, and the Pyramid of Menkaure, along with their associated pyramid complexes and the Great Sphinx of Giza. All were built during the Fourth Dynasty of the Old Kingdom of Ancient Egypt, between 2600 and 2500 BC. The site also includes several cemeteries and the remains of a workers' village.

The Giza pyramid complex consists of the Great Pyramid (also known as the Pyramid of Cheops or Khufu and constructed c. 2580 – c. 2560 BC), the somewhat smaller Pyramid of Khafre (or Chephren) a few hundred metres to the south-west, and the relatively modest-sized Pyramid of Menkaure (or Mykerinos) a few hundred metres farther south-west. The Great Sphinx lies on the east side of the complex. Current consensus among Egyptologists is that the head of the Great Sphinx is that of Khafre. Along with these major monuments are a number of smaller satellite edifices, known as "queens" pyramids, causeways pyramid temples, valley temples, harbours, three cemetery fields and a workers' town.

=== Great Sphinx of Giza ===
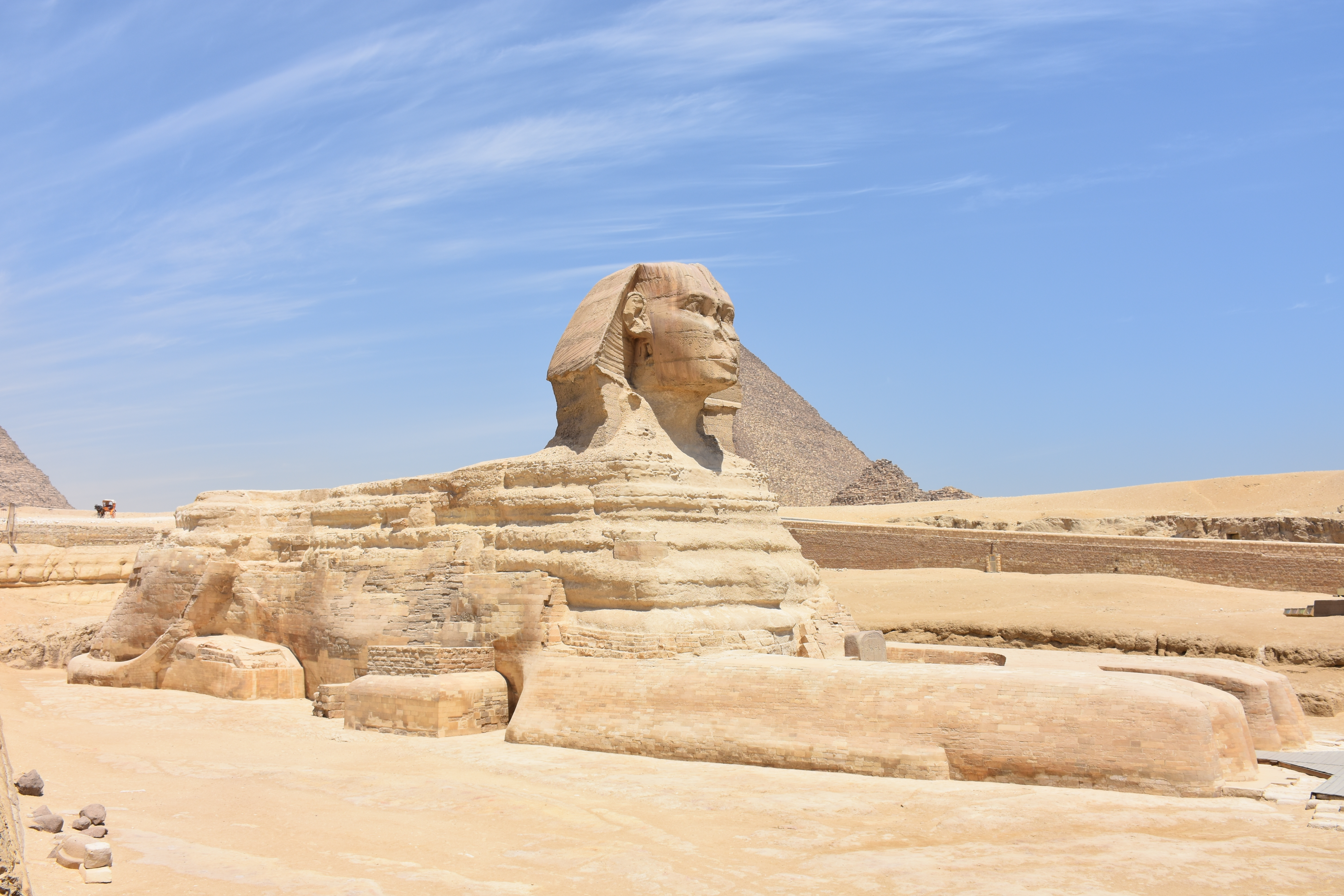
Great Sphinx of Giza

The Great Sphinx of Giza is a limestone statue of a reclining sphinx, a mythical creature with the head of a human, and the body of a lion. Facing directly from west to east, it was carved out of a low lying spur of the Giza Plateau on the west bank of the Nile in Giza. The face of the Sphinx appears to represent the pharaoh Khafre.

The original shape of the Sphinx was cut from the bedrock, and has since been restored with layers of limestone blocks. It measures 73 m (240 ft) long from paw to tail, 20 m (66 ft) high from the base to the top of the head and 19 m (62 ft) wide at its rear haunches. Its nose was broken off between the 3rd and 10th centuries AD. The Arab historian al-Maqrīzī, writing in the 15th century, attributes the loss of the nose to Muhammad Sa'im al-Dahr.

The Sphinx is the oldest known monumental sculpture in Egypt and one of the most recognisable statues in the world. Archaeological evidence suggests that it was created by ancient Egyptians of the Old Kingdom during the reign of Khafre (c. 2558–2532 BC).

== Modern history ==
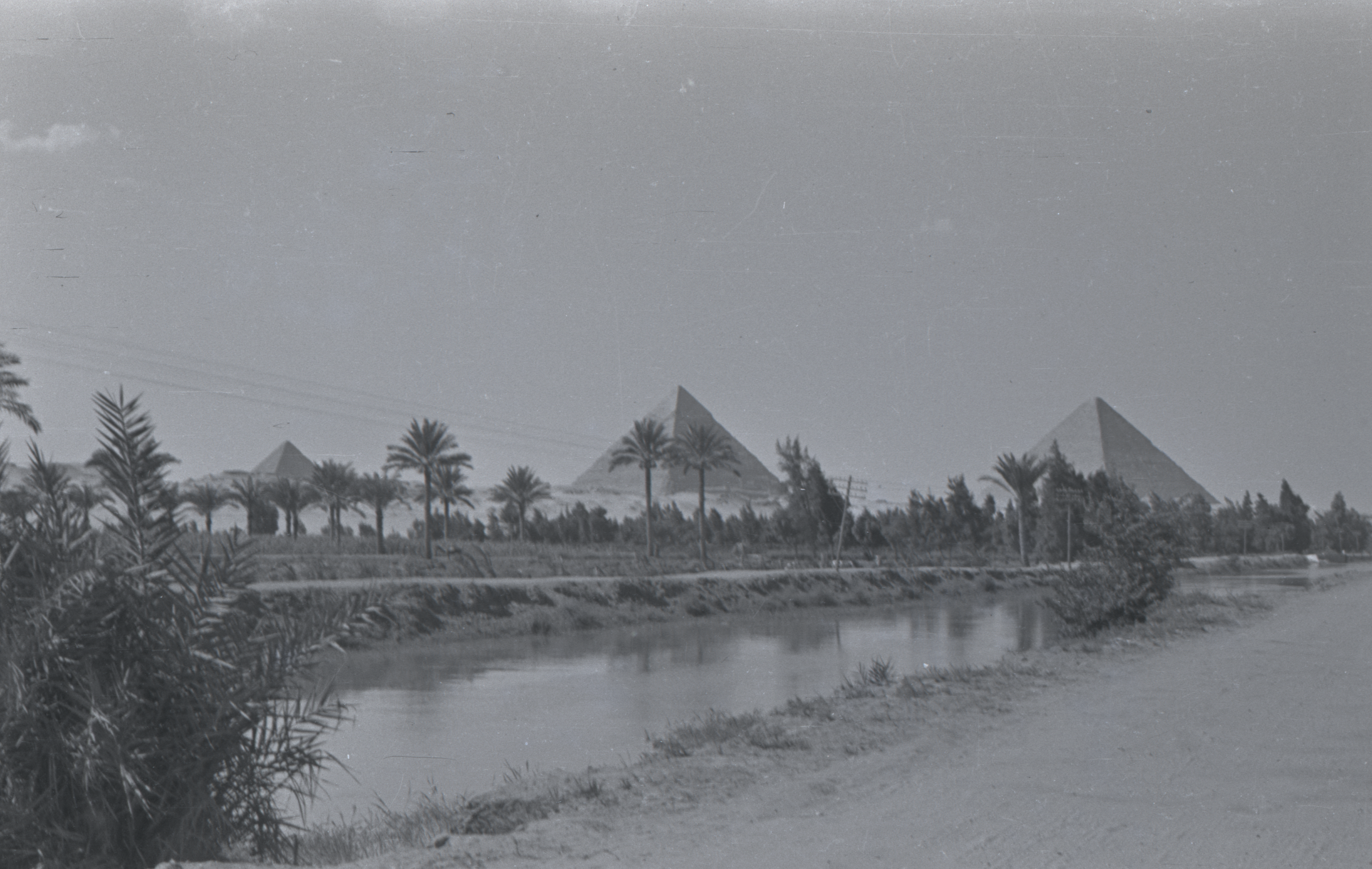
The Plateau seen from afar in 1955

Modern Giza is accessed by two main roads. The road from the north leads to Khufu's pyramid; the other to near the Sphinx's front court, from the east. They cross the Nile River from the east bank and follow the causeway westward. Dominating the plateau and running in a southwest diagonal through the site are the three pyramids of the pharaohs Khufu, Khafre, and Menkaure.

== Survey ==
The Giza Plateau Mapping Project (GPMP) was undertaken in 1984, "an effort to better understand the social and economic forces that supported pyramid construction."

Mark Lehner and his team produced an accurate map of the natural and cultural features of the entire Giza Plateau. Survey data suggested to Lehner possible locations for the city of the pyramid builders, so in 1988 the mission of the GPMP was extended to excavate and survey those areas.

== Conservation Issues ==
Conservation research points out increasing damage risks on the Giza Plateau from a rising groundwater table. Studies connect this rise to irrigation leakage and modern development around the plateau. Moisture and salt movement through limestone can increase weathering and weaken masonry, making groundwater control important for long term preservation.
