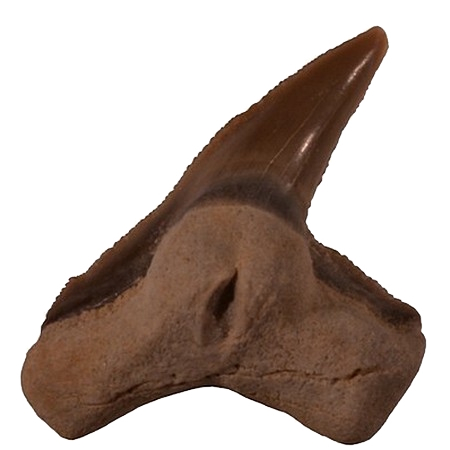
- Tooth of Physogaleus contortus

Scientific classification
- Kingdom: Animalia
- Phylum: Chordata
- Class: Chondrichthyes
- Subclass: Elasmobranchii
- Division: Selachii
- Order: Carcharhiniformes
- Genus: †Physogaleus; Cappetta, 1980

Type species
- †Physogaleus secundus (Winkler, 1876)

Species
- †P. americanus Case, 1994; †P. contortus (Gibbes, 1849); †P. aduncus? (Agassiz, 1835); †P. hemmooriensis Reinecke & Hoedemakers, 2006; †P. huberensis (Case, 1981); †P. latecuspidatus Muller, 1999; †P. latus (Storms, 1894); †P. maltzani (Winkler, 1875); †P. onkensis Boulemia & Adnet, 2023; †P. minor (Agassiz, 1835); †P. rosehillensis Case & Borodin, 2000; †P. secundus (Winkler, 1876); †P. tertius (Winkler, 1876)

= Physogaleus =

Physogaleus Temporal range: Upper Thanetian-Tortonian 56–9.5 Ma Possible Pliocene records

Extinct genus of sharks

Physogaleus is an extinct genus of small requiem shark that lived from the Late Paleocene to Miocene epochs.

== Description ==
Physogaleus is only known from fossil teeth and isolated vertebra. The teeth are similar to those of the modern Tiger shark, but are smaller, with a more central cusp that projects further from the base of the tooth. The species of Physogaleus were originally described as belonging to the same genus as the modern Tiger shark, Galeocerdo. Recognition of numerous differences in dental anatomy of each of these species compared to other species of Galeocerdo lead researchers to establish the genus Physogaleus to include taxa that were more morphologically similar to one another than they were to Galeocerdo.

== Size ==
Physogaleus teeth reach a maximum size that is smaller than true tiger sharks, and they lack the heavy serrations typical of Galeocerdo. They are also more slender and the central cusp can be somewhat twisted toward the crown. This indicates individuals of Physogaleus probably had a diet of bony fish, similar to the living sand-tiger shark, measuring 3 meters (10 ft) long.
