= Turahbuglossus =

Turahbuglossus Temporal range: Early- Middle Eocene

Scientific classification
- Kingdom: Animalia
- Phylum: Chordata
- Class: Actinopterygii
- Order: Pleuronectiformes
- Genus: †Turahbuglossus; Chabanaud, 1937

Extinct genus of fishes

Turahbuglossus is an extinct genus of prehistoric bony fish that lived from the early to middle Eocene.

== See also ==
- Prehistoric fish
- List of prehistoric bony fish
