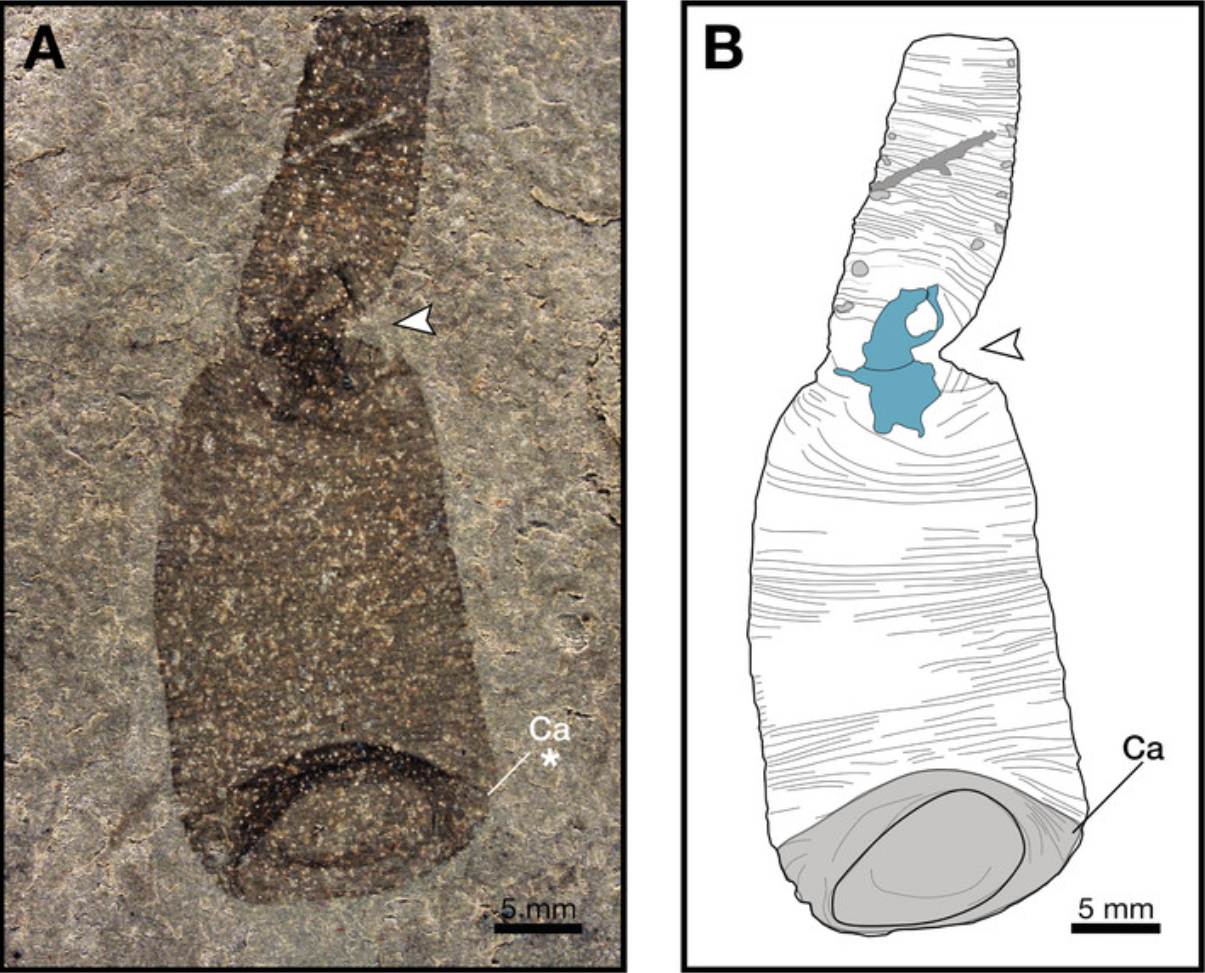
- Holotype of M. siluricus (UWGM 7056)

Scientific classification
- Kingdom: Animalia
- Phylum: Annelida
- Clade: Pleistoannelida
- Clade: Sedentaria
- Class: Clitellata
- Subclass: Hirudinea
- Genus: †Macromyzon; De Carle et al., 2025
- Species: †M. siluricus

Binomial name
- †Macromyzon siluricus De Carle et al., 2025

= Macromyzon =

Macromyzon Temporal range: Early Silurian, (Telychian), 437.4–436.2 Ma

Extinct early leech

Macromyzon (meaning "large sucker") is an extinct genus of basal leech (Hirudinea) known from the lower Silurian Waukesha Biota. A single species is currently known, Macromyzon siluricus, which was discovered in strata belonging to the Telychian-aged Brandon Bridge Formation in Wisconsin, United States. Originally discovered alongside the Waukesha Biota in 1985, this taxon was not properly described until 2025. The description paper, which was published by De Carle et al., (2025), found that this taxon was a member of the hirudinide stem-group, splitting off before crown-group leeches evolved.

Macromyzon is the oldest known leech in the fossil record, the oldest known complete body fossil from the group, and the earliest uncontested appearance of the class Clitellata in general. This taxon is the first of any of the worms from the Waukesha Biota to be described in detail, increasing the known diversity of organisms from the site. Its discovery pushes back the origins of the Hirudinea by more than 100 million years, showing that they originated in marine environments. De Carle et al. (2025) found that instead of being hematophagous (blood-feeding), this taxon most likely hunted and consumed live prey, in contrast to previous assumptions on hirudinean evolution which suggested that they fed on the blood of early vertebrates.

== Background ==
The Brandon Bridge Formation is a geologic formation within the state of Wisconsin that dates to the Lower Silurian (more specifically the Telychian and Sheinwoodian stages). Within the formation exists the smaller Waukesha Biota, a Konservat-Lagerstätten fossil site known for its exceptional preservation of soft-bodied and lightly sclerotized organisms that are not normally found in Silurian strata. The biota itself is found within a 12 cm (4.7 in) layer of thinly-laminated, fine-grained, shallow marine sediments consisting of mudstone and dolomite deposited within a sedimentary trap at the end of an erosional scarp over the eroded dolomites of the Schoolcraft and Burnt Bluff Formations. The site itself is known from two quarries; one in Waukesha county, and the other in the city of Franklin, in Milwaukee County. The two faunas are almost identical to one another, with the exception being that the Franklin quarry lacks any fossils of trilobites. A unique trait of the biota is its taphonomy, being that the majority of hard-shelled organisms (which are normally found in Silurian strata), are poorly preserved, or entirely absent. With the exceptions to this being the various trilobites and conulariids (a group of cnidarians with pyramidal theca) from the site. The exceptional preservation of non-biomineralized and lightly sclerotized remains of the Waukesha Biota is generally attributed to a combination of favorable conditions, including the transportation of organisms to a sediment trap that helped to protect from scavengers, and promoted the buildup of organic films that coated the surfaces of the dead organisms, which inhibited decay, sometimes enhanced by promoting precipitation of a thin phosphatic coating, which is observed on many of the fossils. However, some of the fossils are also coated with other materials, including pyrite and calcium carbonate.

Ironically, Macromyzon was not the first vermiform taxon from the Waukesha Biota to be labeled as a leech, as another fossil (UWGM 2422) was also placed within the hirudinea in multiple papers. However, more recent studies, including Shcherbakov et al. (2020) and Braddy, Gass & Tessler (2023), instead interpreted the fossil as molted remains belonging to an unidentified member of the cycloneuralia, and that the 'suckered end' seen in the specimen was instead a breakage point in the molt.

== Discovery and naming ==
The type specimen of M. siluricus, including close ups of the fossil, the pattern of segmentation (E), and comparisons to the extant genera Myxobdella and Haementeria (F and G respectively).

The holotype, and only known specimen of Macromyzon, catalogued as UWGM 7056, was discovered within the 'West Quarry' near the city of Waukesha, which is owned and operated by the Waukesha Lime and Stone Company. Like with the majority of the fossils known from the site, the holotype specimen is housed within the collections of the UW Madison Geology Museum. However, as with the majority of the taxa known from the Waukesha fauna, this species wouldn't be properly described for several decades. Its description marks the first time that any of the worm fossils from the site have been properly named and analyzed thoroughly. According to the description study, the fossil was prepared using a freeze-thaw method to help split the dolostone containing the holotype. Curiously, it seems several earlier studies that predate the annelids description in 2025 suggested that it may have been a poriferan, or a poriferan-like organism, before its more confident placement in the hirudinea stem-group.

This leeches genus name, Macromyzon, is derived from the greek words, makros, meaning "large", and myzon, meaning "sucker". The species name siluricus, is derived from the Silurian period, when the taxa of the Waukesha Biota were deposited.

== Description ==
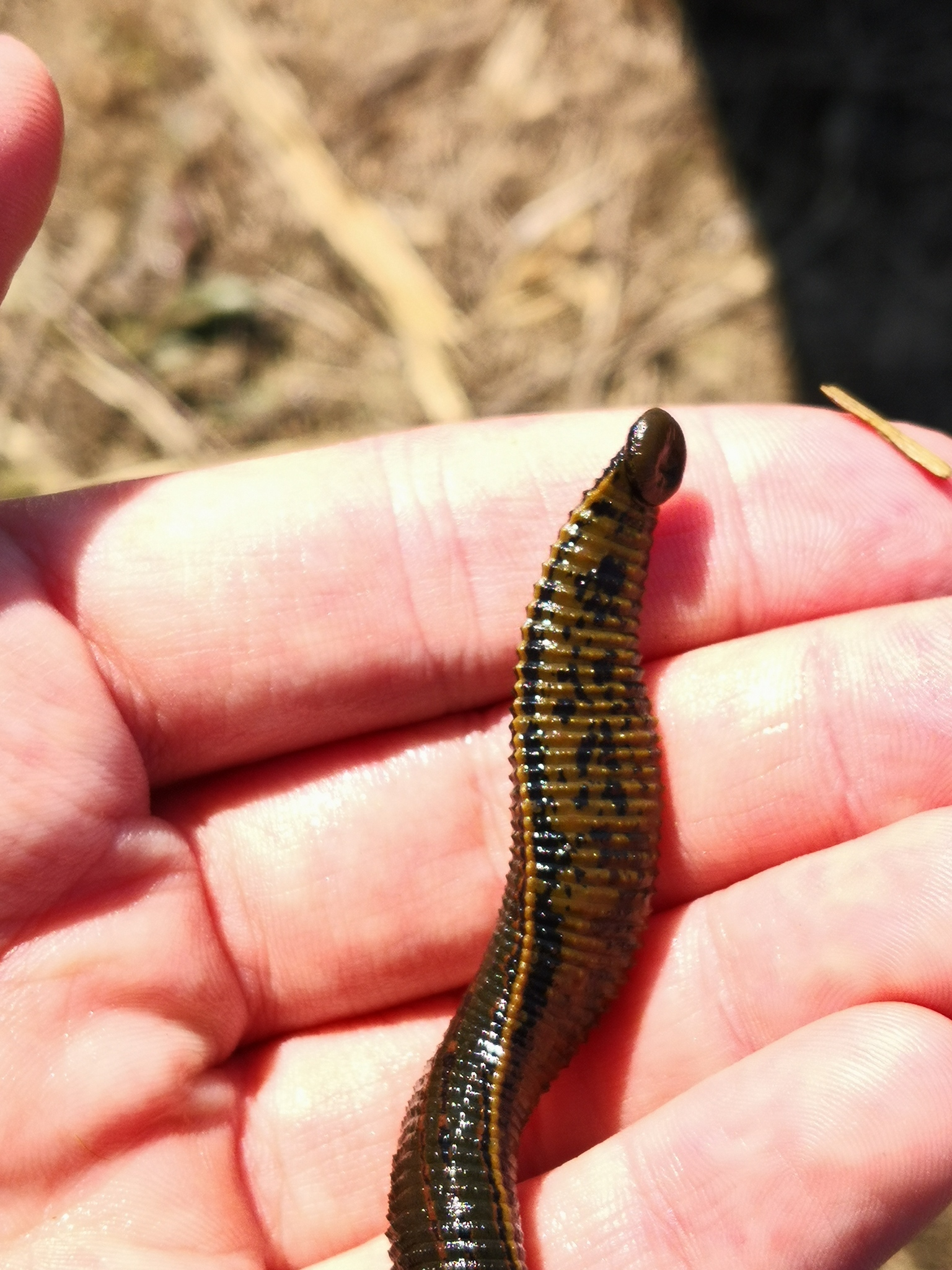
Visible segmentation and annuli found on an extant European medicinal leech (Hirudo medicinalis)

Macromyzon was a modest sized annelid, with the holotype specimen reaching a maximum length of around 51 mm (5.1 cm) long, and featuring a maximum width of around 18.9 mm (1.89 cm), making quite large for a leech, especially considering its basal placement within hirudinean evolution. This annelid features a segmentation pattern similar to modern leaches, with 15 visible segments on the holotype specimen, and up to a 109 discernible annuli as well amongst the main segments. This annelid seems to show a sexannulate condition, with three larger annulations making up each segment, with them further being divided into two halves, adding up to six annuli total per segment. The holotype also features a set of circular structures running along its dorsal side, which have been interpreted as putative tubercles, however the authors state that they cannot rule out the possibility of these structures being taphonomic in origin. The holotype specimen shows several signs of taphonomic damage, including a noticeable torsion on roughly the upper middle region, and a distinct breakage point on the anterior end. The posterior-most region of the specimen is dominated by a large caudal sucker which is adorned by several sets of striations running along it. The specimen also appears to be twisted at the midline, with the anterior region representing the dorsal surface, which is evidenced by the putative tubercles, and the more broad posterior region representing the ventral surface, evidenced by the striations on the caudal sucker and the lack of potential tubercles, along with the curving direction of the annuli across the specimen.

== Taxonomy ==
In their 2025 study, De Carle et al. ran multiple analyses coding multiple parts of the taxon's anatomy, including the large caudal sucker, probable tubercles, less rigid cuticle, and the pattern of segmentation, and found that at the very least, Macromyzon is a stem-group hirudinean, and most likely represents a stem leech, which forms a sister group to the extant true leeches of the hirudinida, but more crown-ward then the other two orders of modern hirudineans. Alongside this, the authors examined the holotype in order to confirm or deny a placement among any other vermiform groups. The lack of any outgrowths or limbs on the sides of the body seemingly remove any possibility of the taxon being a polychaete, as the uncontested polychaetes known from the Waukesha fauna preserve both their parapodia and chaetae bundles. Alongside this, the authors also disagree with the taxon being aligned with the palaeoscolecids, as the lack of sclerites, a less rigid cuticle, and the lack of an elongated body plan seemingly places the taxon outside of the group. Alongside that, the palaeoscolecids known from Waukesha commonly preserve regions of their gut, which is seemingly absent from the holotype of Macromyzon.

- Annelida
  - - - - Harmothoe
        - †Dryptoscolex
      - - †Esconites
        - Eunice
    - Capitella
  - Clitellata
    - Lumbriculidae
    - Hirudinea
      - Branchiobdellida
      - - Acanthobdellida
        - - †Macromyzon
          - Hirudinida (true leeches)
            - Hirudo
            - Glossiphonia

The following cladogram is based off of the findings by De Carle et al. (2025), specifically the cladogram focusing on the relationship between Macromyzon and other annelids.

== Significance ==
Macromyzon represents a unique discovery, as it casts doubt on many long-held theories on the evolution of leeches, including their environmental origins and their lifestyles. For one, this taxon represents not only the oldest confirmed member of the hirudinea yet known, but also of the clitellata in general, and pushes back the origins of the group by more than a hundred million years earlier than their previously oldest uncontested occurrences in the Permian of South Africa and Kazakhstan. However, De Carle et al., (2025) speculates that the hirudinea may have originated earlier on in the Paleozoic. Macromyzon also represents the oldest confirmed body fossil from the group, as many of the other fossil specimens known represent egg carrying cocoons, and thus are harder to confidently be assigned as belonging to leeches and not from other clitellate groups. This taxon also shows that early leeches seemingly evolved from more basal annelids in marine environments before transitioning to freshwater areas, meaning that crown leeches living in freshwater areas most likely represents a derived condition for the group. It also helps strengthen the theory that the acanthobdellida and branchiobdellida, two groups of clitellates that branched off before true leeches evolved, may represent transitions into freshwater that are independent to that of the euhirudineans (true leeches). The diet of this Silurian taxon is also of great importance, as it was once assumed that early leeches were already hematophagous, and targeted early vertebrates. However, the lack of crown-group vertebrates from the Waukesha Biota, and the rare occurrence of jawless vertebrates like conodonts from the site, indicates that Macromyzon was either most likely hunting live prey, or was a parasite to the various contemporary invertebrates. This seemingly lines up with most modern taxa being primarily carnivorous, and the groups that are blood-feeding ectoparasites seemingly represent a derived condition in true leeches.

== Paleobiology and paleoecology ==
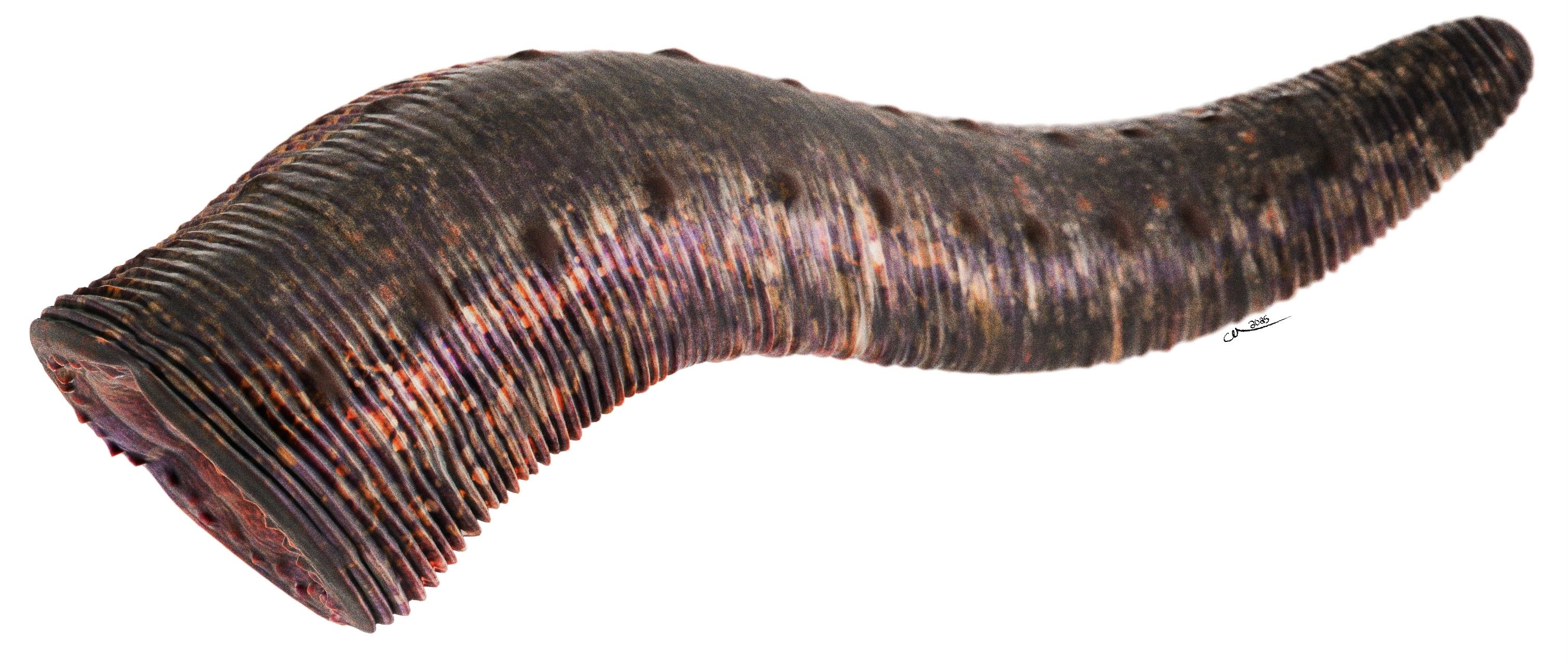
Life reconstruction of M. siluricus

Macromyzon held a very curious niche within the shallow lagoons of Silurian Waukesha, as instead of being a blood feeding parasite of early gnathostomes like what was once believed, this basal leech was most likely a carnivorous predator within its environment. Considering its size, it's likely that this annelid held a niche as a dominant predator within its environment, due to the relatively small size of the majority of the contemporary fauna. Its appearance in shallow marine areas, while not unique among hirudineans, indicates that this leech was acclimated to living in fully saltwater areas, and that the appearance of leeches in freshwater and terrestrial areas was a more derived radiation later on in the group's evolution.

During the lower Silurian, the area that would become the Waukesha Biota was a shallow peritidal environment. The preservational area of the region was most likely anoxic, and in combination with oceanic currents, helped to preserve the organisms from the ecosystem. The conditions of the sediments were similar to a Winogradsky column, as the various levels of bacteria within the sediments helped entomb and preserve the fossils free of the risk of scavenging. Some notable contemporary organisms include various arthropods (phyllocarids, thylacocephalans, etc.) palaeoscolecids, lobopodians, other annelids, poriferans, conodonts, and various other groups, including corals, echinoderms, brachiopods, cephalopods, and other mollusks.
