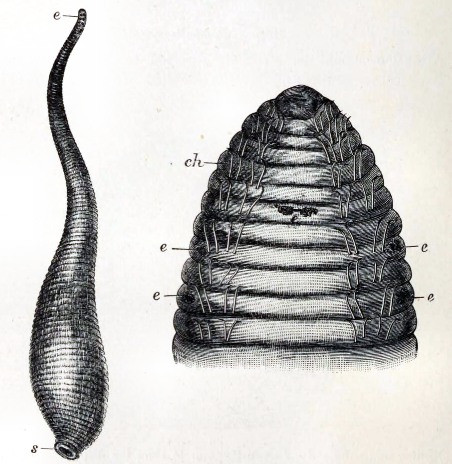
- Acanthobdella peledina

Scientific classification
- Domain: Eukaryota
- Kingdom: Animalia
- Phylum: Annelida
- Clade: Pleistoannelida
- Clade: Sedentaria
- Class: Clitellata
- Subclass: Hirudinea
- Infraclass: Acanthobdellidea

= Acanthobdellidea =

Family of annelid worms

Acanthobdellidea is an infraclass of primitive leeches; some authors place them in a separate subclass from the Hirudinea. However, the World Register of Marine Species places them within the Hirudinea, as a sister group to Euhirudinea, the true leeches.

Species in the group include Acanthobdella peledina, described by the German zoologist Adolph Eduard Grube in 1851, and A. livanowi, described in 1966.
