= Hemibdella soleae =

Scientific classification
- Domain: Eukaryota
- Kingdom: Animalia
- Phylum: Annelida
- Clade: Pleistoannelida
- Clade: Sedentaria
- Class: Clitellata
- Subclass: Hirudinea
- Order: Rhynchobdellida
- Family: Piscicolidae
- Genus: Hemibdella
- Species: H. soleae

Binomial name
- Hemibdella soleae (van Beneden & Hesse, 1863)

Species of annelid worm

Hemibdella soleae is a marine species of leech in the family Piscicolidae and the type taxon of its genus. Found in the northeastern Atlantic Ocean, it is a parasite of flatfish such as the common sole.

== Description ==
This small leech grows to a length of about 10 mm (0.4 in) when extended. It is roughly cylindrical, thicker in the middle and narrowing somewhat to a sucker at each end. Newly-hatched larvae are yellowish and transparent and have a pair of eyespots. As they grow they become opaque, with black speckles, and lose the eyespots; later they become beige or grey, and finally black.

== Distribution and habitat ==
The range of Hemibdella soleae extends across the northeastern Atlantic Ocean, the North Sea and the Mediterranean Sea. Like the flatfish it parasitizes, it is benthic and demersal (living on and just above the seabed) and occurs at depths down to about 200 m (660 ft).

== Ecology ==
Hemibdella soleae is an ectoparasite of flatfish such as the common sole (Solea solea). Like other marine leeches, it feeds on its host's blood, but unlike most freshwater species, it does not drop off the fish after it has fed, instead remaining attached by its anterior sucker. In the juvenile leech, the remnants of each blood meal is visible through the transparent skin as a small red ball inside. In the northern part of its range, the common sole is the main host, but further south, other fish are also parasitized; these include the Senegalese sole (Solea senegalensis), the wedge sole (Dicologlossa cuneata), the bastard sole (Microchirus azevia), the Klein's sole (Synapturichthys kleinii), the sand sole (Pegusa lascaris) and the Portuguese sole (Dagetichthys lusitanica). In the English Channel, small common sole may have one or two leeches on them while large fish may have forty or more of the parasites.

Adult leeches attached to the underside of fish lay eggs on the seabed in locations where the fish like to semi-bury themselves in the sediment; the eggs have stalks and are anchored to grains of sand. The free-swimming larvae search out a host fish and attach to the anterior end of the dorsal surface, the only part of the fish not buried in sediment. After a short period of development, the larvae migrate to the ventral surface of the fish. Here they attach to the host with their front sucker oriented towards the front of the fish.
