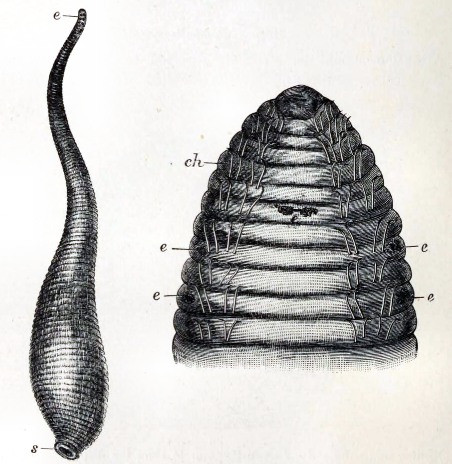
- Acanthobdella peledina

Scientific classification
- Kingdom: Animalia
- Phylum: Annelida
- Clade: Pleistoannelida
- Clade: Sedentaria
- Class: Clitellata
- Subclass: Hirudinea
- Order: Acanthobdellida
- Family: Acanthobdellidae
- Genus: Acanthobdella
- Species: A. peledina

Binomial name
- Acanthobdella peledina Grube, 1851

= Acanthobdella peledina =

Species of annelid worm

Acanthobdella peledina is a species of leech-like clitellate in the order Acanthobdellida. It feeds on the skin and blood of freshwater fishes in the boreal regions of northern Europe, Asia and North America.

== Taxonomy ==
The taxonomy of Acanthobdellida has been contentious for many years, but it is now recognized as the sister group to leeches. Acanthobdella peledina was first described by the German zoologist Adolph Eduard Grube in 1851. For a long time, it was believed to be the only species in the order, but in 1966, another species, Paracanthobdella livanowi, was described from the vicinity of the Kamchatka Peninsula in eastern Siberia.

== Description ==
A. peledina differs from leeches in not having a well-developed sucker at its anterior end; instead, it attaches to its host with about forty hooked chaetae (chitinous bristles) borne on its first five segments. It is in fact unique among Hirudinea in having chaetae at all, and also in having a coelom (body cavity) divided by septa into a discontinuous channel. Other ways in which it differs from other leeches are that the body is divided into 29 segments, it lacks a prostomium and a peristomium, and the nephridia do not have funnels. It has a sucker at the posterior end, and moves in a leech-like fashion by alternately extending its anterior end forward, then clinging on with its hooked chaetae while it brings its posterior sucker close to its front end. The leeches are cylindrical, olive green and 0.9–3.3 cm (0.4–1.3 in) in length.

== Distribution ==
A. peledina occurring mainly in Fennoscandia. It has a boreal distribution and is known from freshwater locations in northern Europe and Asia, and from Alaska. In addition 16 localities are know from Siberia.

== Ecology ==
Acanthobdella peledina is a cold adapted parasite species. It is a fish parasite living mainly on the skin of salmonid fishes in Fennoscandiae. One of the fish in Alaska parasitized by A. peledina is the sardine cisco (Coregonus sardinella). The worms were found just behind the pelvic fins with their anterior ends embedded in the skin and muscle tissue below. A. peledina attaches to the body of fish, feeding on blood, skin, fins and flesh, but this parasites are not harmful to humans and the fish can be cleaned and cooked as usual.

A. peledina occurs in cold water lakes in Fennoscandia. Alpine and Arctic ecosystems are sensitive to warming which may pose a serious threat to this cold water species.
