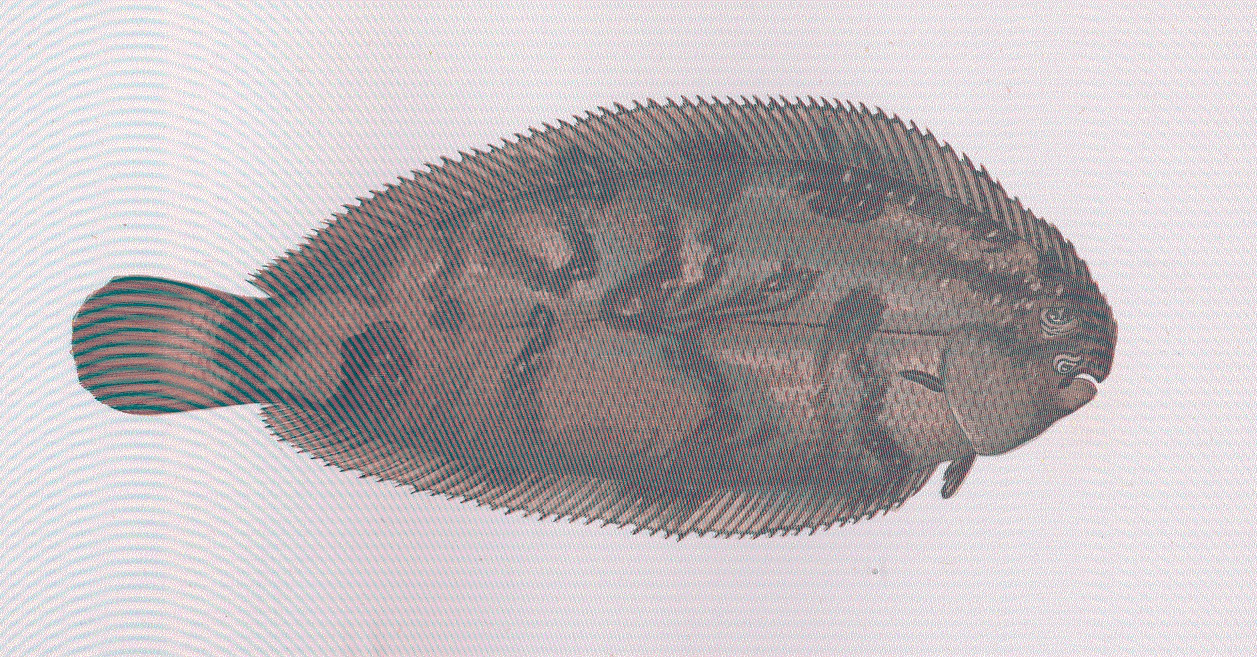

Conservation status
- Least Concern (IUCN 3.1)

Scientific classification
- Kingdom: Animalia
- Phylum: Chordata
- Class: Actinopterygii
- Order: Carangiformes
- Suborder: Pleuronectoidei
- Family: Soleidae
- Genus: Microchirus
- Species: M. variegatus

Binomial name
- Microchirus variegatus (Donovan, 1808)

Synonyms
- Pleuronectes variegatus Donovan, 1808; Monochirus variegatus (Donovan, 1808); Solea variegata (Donovan, 1808); Pleuronectes microchirus Delaroche, 1809; Pleuronectes mangilli Risso, 1810; Pleuronectes fasciatus Nardo, 1824; Monochirus lingula Costa, 1847-48

= Thickback sole =

Species of fish

The thickback sole (Microchirus variegatus), also known as the bastard sole and lucky sole, is a species of flatfish from the family of true soles, the Soleidae. It is found in the eastern Atlantic Ocean and the Mediterranean Sea, it is a quarry for fisheries in the Mediterranean.

== Description ==
The thickback sole has the typical slender, elongated, oval body shape of soles but which is thick from side to side. It has a smoothly rounded snout. small head with a strongly curved mouth on its underside. They have large eyes which have a diameter which is greater than the length of the snout. The dorsal fin has its origin near the front of its upper eye and has a smooth profile with 63-80 fin rays, the anal fin is shorter with 47-64 fin rays. The caudal fin is separate from last rays of the dorsal and anal fins. The lateral line has 65-98 pored scales. It has small pectoral fins with the one on the blind side being minute. The eyed side is brown in colour with five transverse black bands which reach to the dorsal and anal fins creating dark patches on these fins. The largest fish recorded had a standard length of 35 cm, they are more normally recorded with a total length of 14 cm.

== Distribution ==
The thickback sole occurs in the northeast Atlantic, from Great Britain and Ireland south to the Baie du Lévrier in Senegal, they are also found around Madeira. In the Mediterranean Sea, this species can be found throughout the basin except for the coasts of the Levantine Sea.

== Habitat and biology ==
This species is benthic on sea beds consisting of sand and mud, preferring coarse sand. on the continental shelf and slope, at depths between 80 and 400 m. It feeds on a wide range of small benthic organisms, largely crustaceans such as amphipods and shrimp, also polychaetes and bivalves. The spawning season runs from early March to early summer in the English Channel but from late winter and spring to early autumn off Ireland. They can live for up to 14 year. The young thickback sole develop in open-sea nurseriesand settle into a benthic mode at a relatively young age compared to common sole and this may be why they are rarely recorded in coastal waters.

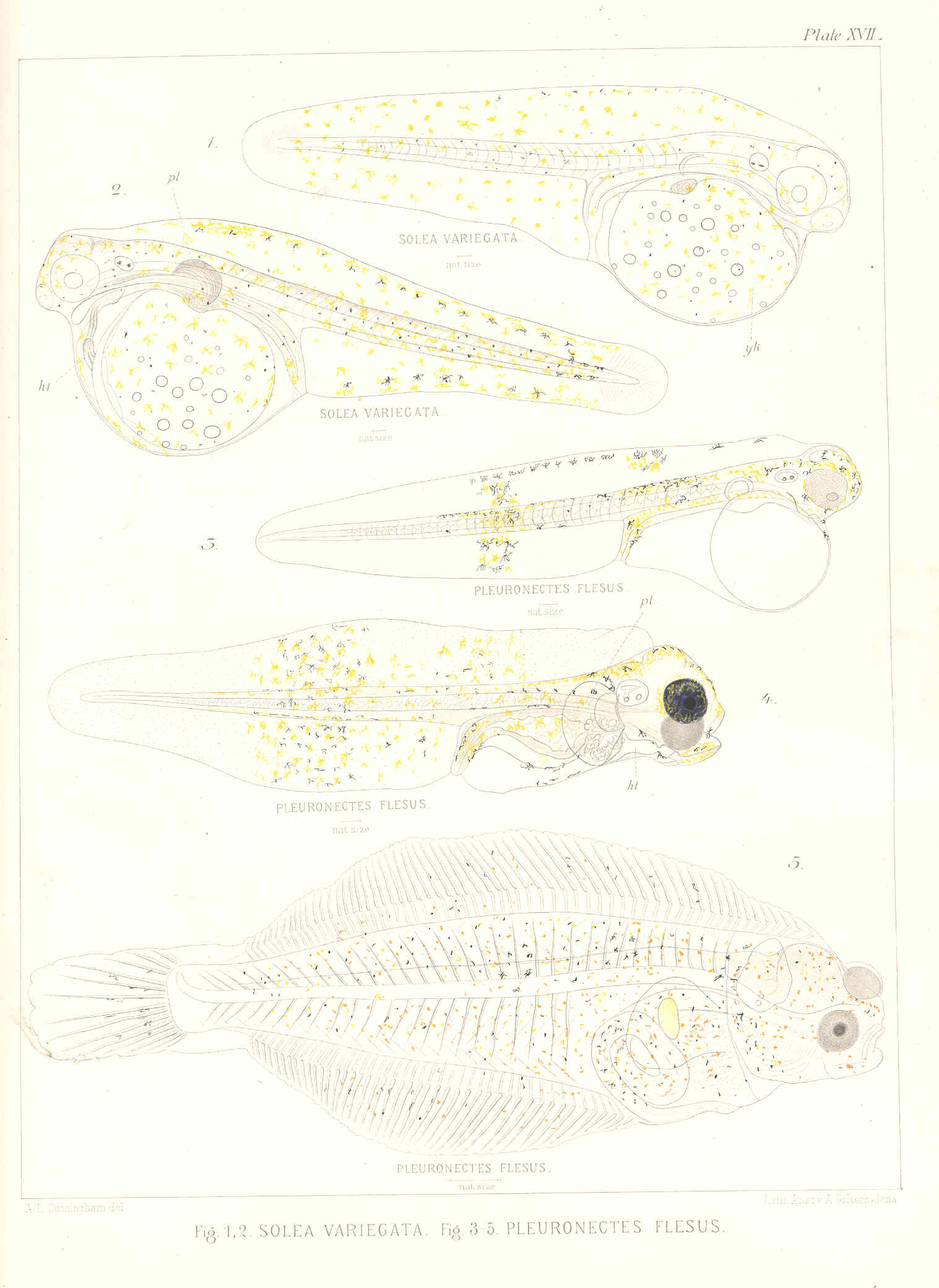
FMIB 47584 Solea variegata - Larva of Thickback Newly hatched, April 24, 1889, Pigment as seen by reflected light yk- yolk (1); Solea

== Fisheries ==
The thickback sole is not utilized in fisheries in the central eastern Atlantic but in the Mediterranean it is a commercially exploited species and is regularly observed in markets in Morocco, the Tyrrhenian Sea and the Adriatic Sea. Elsewhere it is not common in markets. The flesh is highly esteemed and is marketed both fresh and frozen.

The average depth of commercial trawls in the Atlantic is between 35m and 200m and this could mean that thickback soles are caught in a significant amount as bycatch and that most are discarded, the effects of this bycatch on the population is not known. The commercial fisheries for thickback sole in the Mediterranean uses trawls, gill and trammel nets.
