= Solea capensis =

Scientific classification
- Kingdom: Animalia
- Phylum: Chordata
- Class: Actinopterygii
- Order: Carangiformes
- Suborder: Pleuronectoidei
- Family: Soleidae
- Genus: Solea
- Species: S. capensis

Binomial name
- Solea capensis Gilchrist, 1902

Species of fish

Solea capensis is a species of ray-finned fish in the family Soleidae.

It was first described in 1902 by John Gilchrist.
