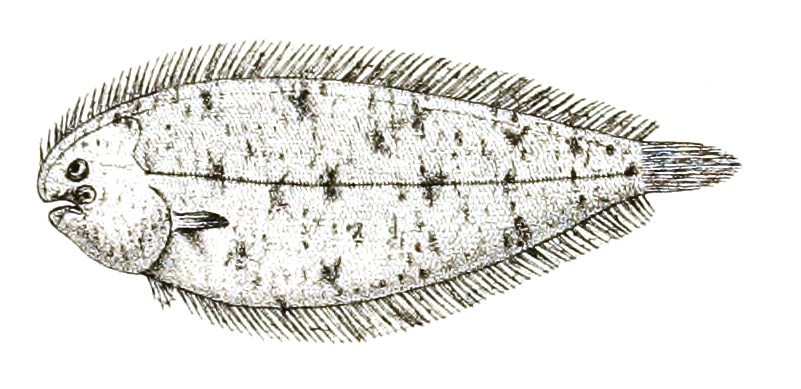

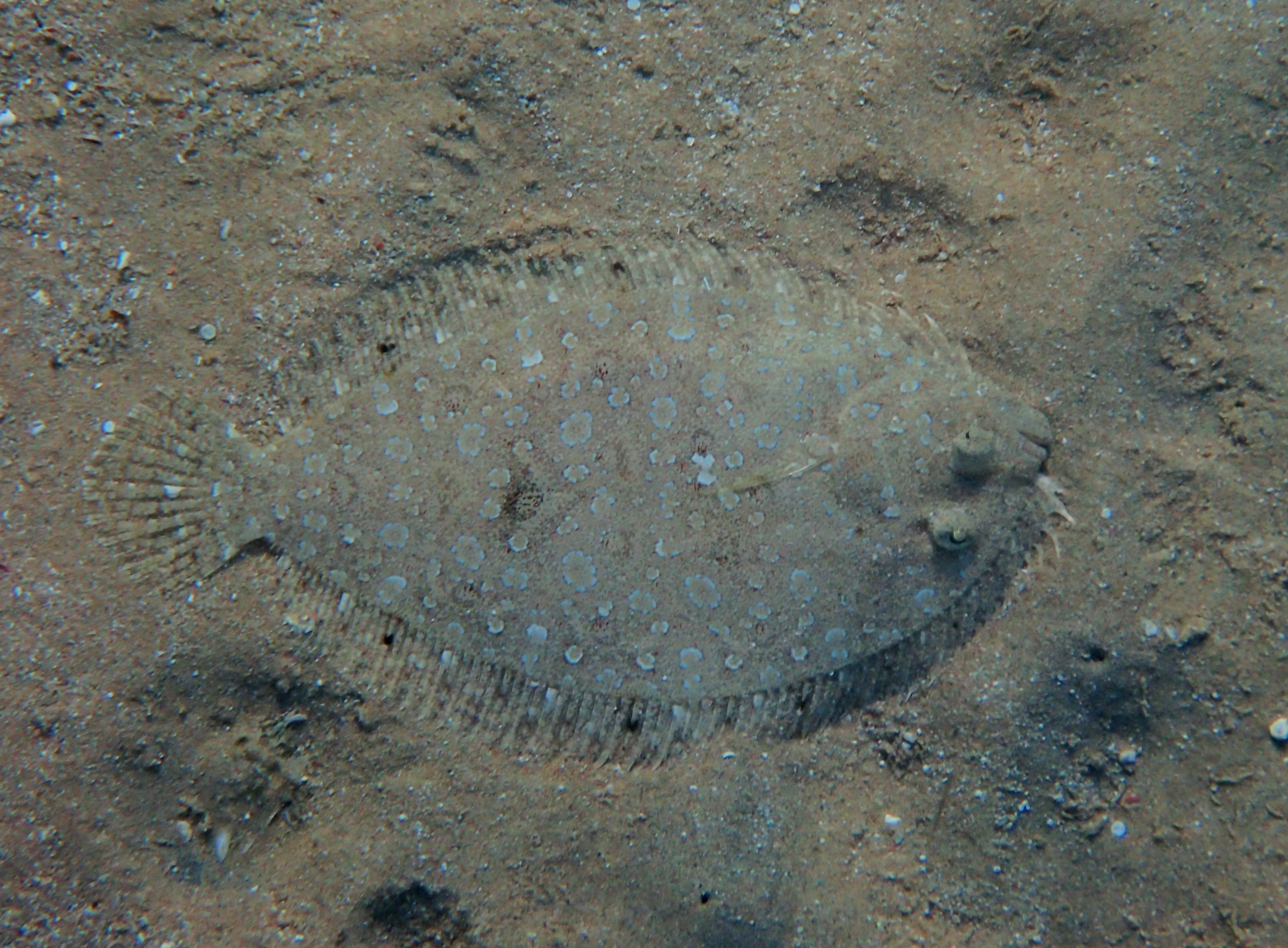

Conservation status
- Least Concern (IUCN 3.1)

Scientific classification
- Kingdom: Animalia
- Phylum: Chordata
- Class: Actinopterygii
- Order: Carangiformes
- Suborder: Pleuronectoidei
- Family: Soleidae
- Genus: Solea
- Species: S. elongata

Binomial name
- Solea elongata Day, 1877

= Solea elongata =

Species of fish

Solea elongata, the elongated sole, is a species of ray-finned fish in the family Soleidae. It is native to the Indian Ocean, off the coast of various Middle Eastern countries, as well as Pakistan, India, Sri Lanka and Somalia.
