= Solea turbynei =

Conservation status
- Least Concern (IUCN 3.1)

Scientific classification
- Kingdom: Animalia
- Phylum: Chordata
- Class: Actinopterygii
- Order: Carangiformes
- Suborder: Pleuronectoidei
- Family: Soleidae
- Genus: Solea
- Species: S. turbynei

Binomial name
- Solea turbynei Gilchrist, 1904

Species of flatfish

Solea turbynei, the blackhand sole, Natal sole and Turbyne's sole, is a species of flatfish in the family Soleidae.
