= Solea stanalandi =

Conservation status
- Data Deficient (IUCN 3.1)

Scientific classification
- Kingdom: Animalia
- Phylum: Chordata
- Class: Actinopterygii
- Order: Carangiformes
- Suborder: Pleuronectoidei
- Family: Soleidae
- Genus: Solea
- Species: S. stanalandi

Binomial name
- Solea stanalandi Randall & McCarthy, 1989

Species of flatfish

Solea stanalandi, the Stanaland's sole, is a species of flatfish in the family Soleidae.
