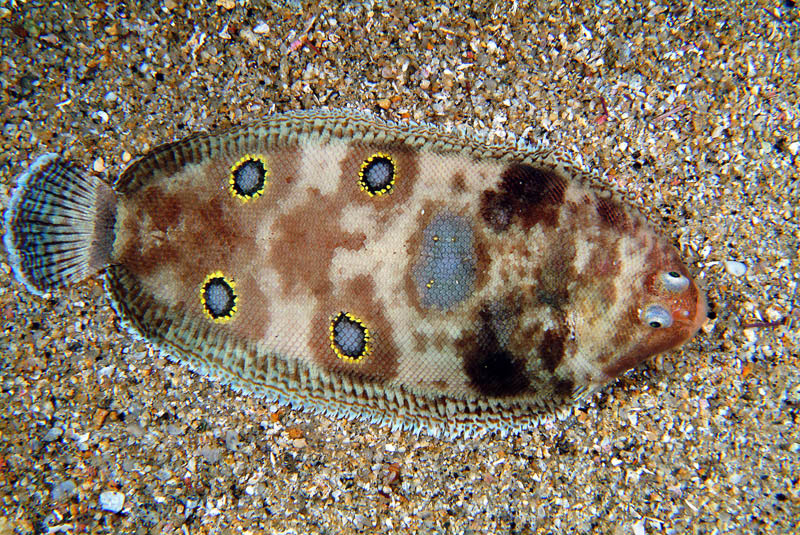
- Microchirus ocellatus

Scientific classification
- Kingdom: Animalia
- Phylum: Chordata
- Class: Actinopterygii
- Order: Carangiformes
- Suborder: Pleuronectoidei
- Family: Soleidae
- Genus: Microchirus; Bonaparte, 1833

Type species
- Pleuronectes microchirus as a synonym of Microchirus variegatus Delaroche, 1809

Synonyms
- Boglossus Günther, 1862; Echinosolea Chabanaud, 1927; Monochirus Oken, 1817; Zevaia Chabanaud, 1943

= Microchirus =

Microchirus Temporal range: Late Miocene–present

Genus of fishes

Microchirus is a genus of soles native to the Eastern Atlantic Ocean and Mediterranean Sea.

== Species ==
There are currently seven recognized species in this genus:

- Microchirus azevia (Brito Capello, 1867) (Bastard sole)
- Microchirus boscanion (Chabanaud, 1926) (Lusitanian sole)
- Microchirus frechkopi Chabanaud, 1952 (Frechkop's sole)
- Microchirus ocellatus (Linnaeus, 1758) (Foureyed sole)
- Microchirus theophila (A. Risso, 1810)
- Microchirus variegatus (Donovan, 1808) (Thickback sole)
- Microchirus wittei Chabanaud, 1950 (Banded sole)

One fossil species, †Microchirus abropteryx (Sauvage, 1870) (=Solea proocellata Arambourg, 1927) is known from the Late Miocene of Italy and Algeria.
