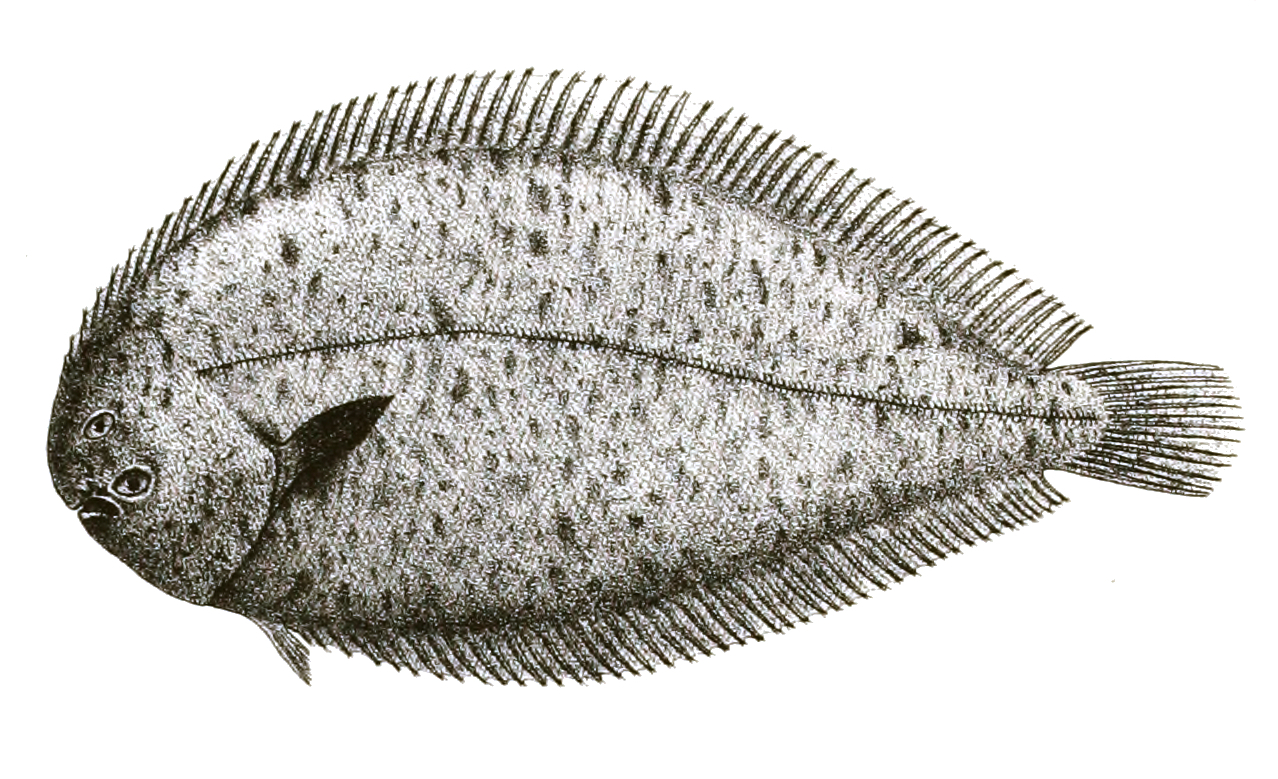

Conservation status
- Least Concern (IUCN 3.1)

Scientific classification
- Kingdom: Animalia
- Phylum: Chordata
- Class: Actinopterygii
- Division: Teleostei
- Order: Carangiformes
- Suborder: Pleuronectoidei
- Family: Soleidae
- Genus: Solea
- Species: S. ovata

Binomial name
- Solea ovata Richardson, 1846

= Ovate sole =

Species of fish

The ovate sole (Solea ovata) is a species of flatfish in the family Soleidae. It is native to the Indo-Pacific, and is a demersal species found in shallow water with sand and mud bottoms. Its mitochondrial genome has been completely sequenced, having a total length of 16,782 bp, with 13 protein-coding genes, 22 tRNA genes, and 2 rRNA genes.
