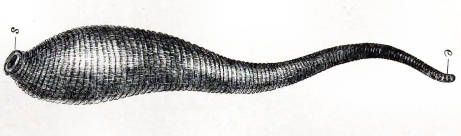

Scientific classification
- Kingdom: Animalia
- Phylum: Annelida
- Clade: Pleistoannelida
- Clade: Sedentaria
- Class: Clitellata
- Subclass: Hirudinea
- Order: Acanthobdellida
- Family: Acanthobdellidae
- Genus: Acanthobdella; Grube, 1851

Species
- Acanthobdella livanowi; Acanthobdella peledina

= Acanthobdella =

Genus of annelid worms

Acanthobdella is a genus of annelids belonging to the family Acanthobdellidae.

The species of this genus are found in Europe and North America.

Species:

- Acanthobdella livanowi (Epshtein, 1966)
- Acanthobdella peledina Grube, 1851
