= Solea heinii =

Conservation status
- Data Deficient (IUCN 3.1)

Scientific classification
- Kingdom: Animalia
- Phylum: Chordata
- Class: Actinopterygii
- Order: Carangiformes
- Suborder: Pleuronectoidei
- Family: Soleidae
- Genus: Solea
- Species: S. heinii

Binomial name
- Solea heinii Steindachner, 1903

Species of flatfish

Solea heinii is a species of flatfish in the family Soleidae.
