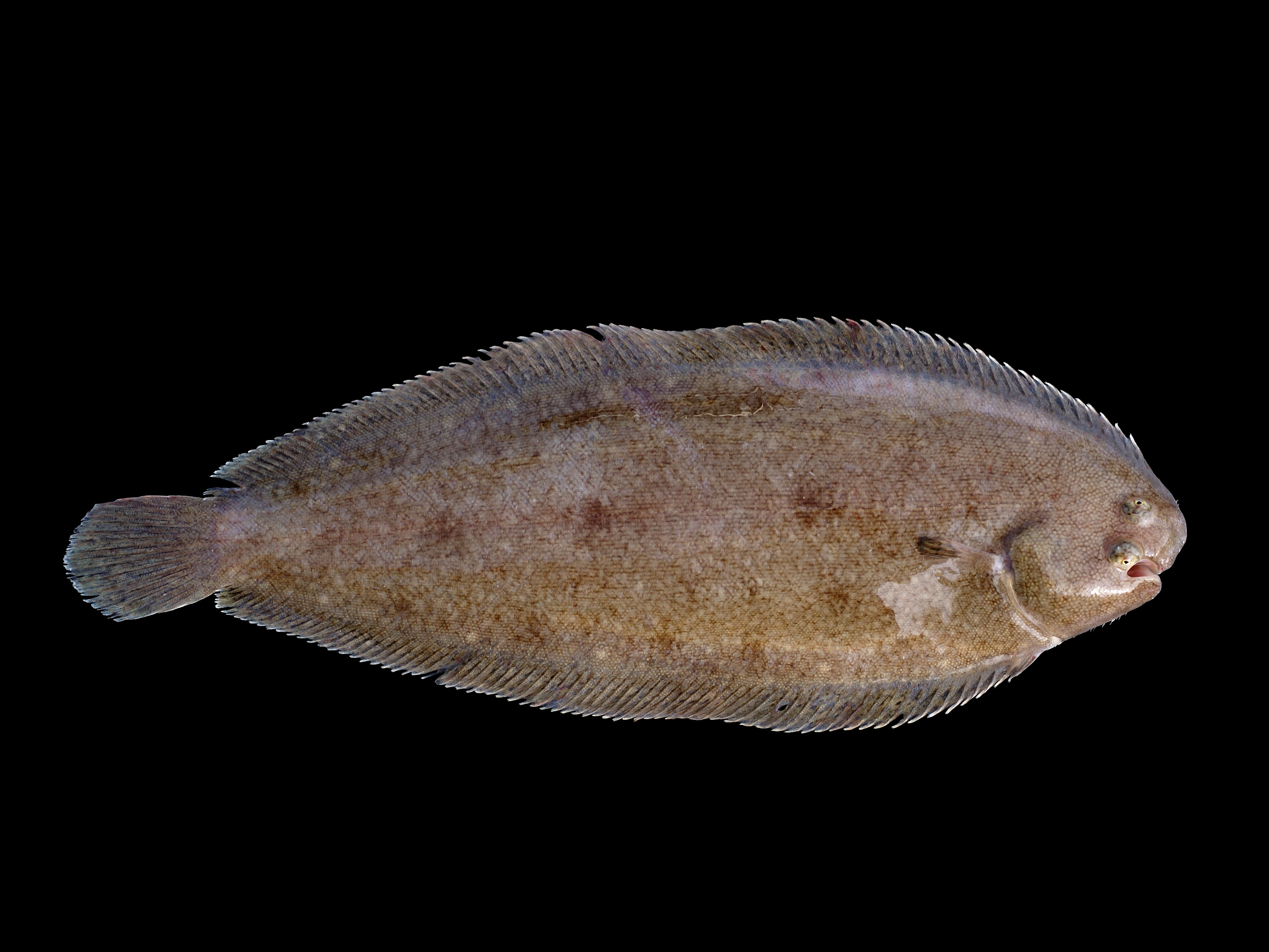

Conservation status
- Data Deficient (IUCN 3.1)

Scientific classification
- Kingdom: Animalia
- Phylum: Chordata
- Class: Actinopterygii
- Division: Teleostei
- Order: Carangiformes
- Suborder: Pleuronectoidei
- Family: Soleidae
- Genus: Solea
- Species: S. solea

Binomial name
- Solea solea (Linnaeus, 1758)

Synonyms
- Pleuronectes solea Linnaeus, 1758; Solea vulgaris Quensel, 1806

= Common sole =

Species of fish

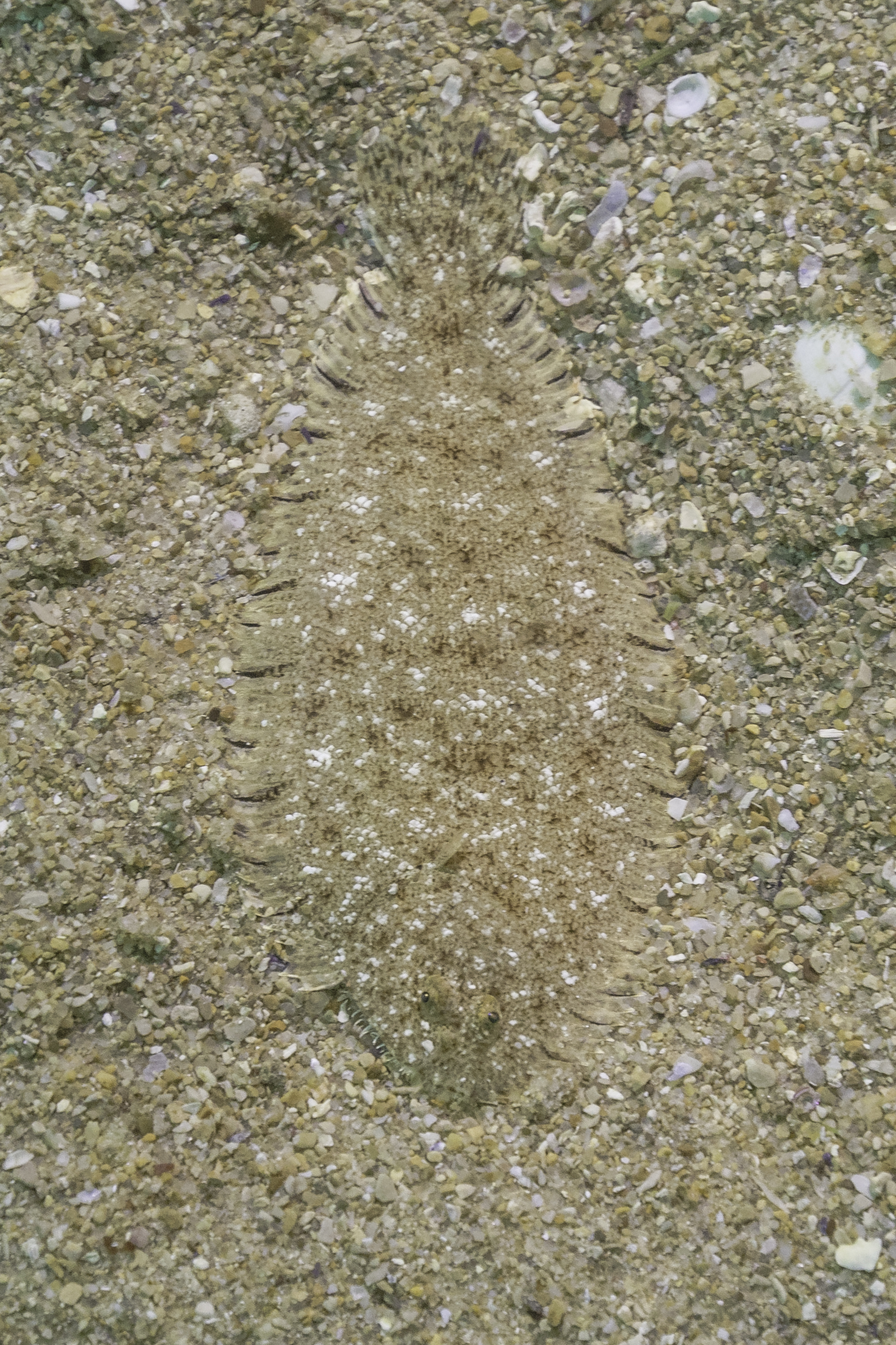
Common sole camouflaged in the sand.

The common sole, Dover sole, or black sole (Solea solea) is a species of flatfish in the family Soleidae. It is one of the largest fish in the Solea genus. It lives on the sandy or muddy seabed of the northern Atlantic and the Mediterranean Sea where it often partially immerses itself in the substrate. The upper side is greyish-brown while the underside is white. It grows to a maximum length of about 70 cm (28 in). The species is prized as a food fish, being caught mostly by bottom trawling on the seabed. The name "Dover" comes from Dover, the English fishing port landing the most sole in the 19th century.

== Description ==
The small eyes are close to each other on the right side of the body. This gives the fish the possibility of lurking half-buried in the sand for passing prey. The common sole, just like all other flatfishes, hatches as an "ordinary" fish with one eye on each side of the body. The young metamorphose to flatfish begins when they are about one centimeter long. The upper side is greyish-brown and the underside is white. The common sole approaches a maximum length of 70 cm (28 in). In the UK, a small sole is commercially called a "slip".

== Distribution and habitat ==
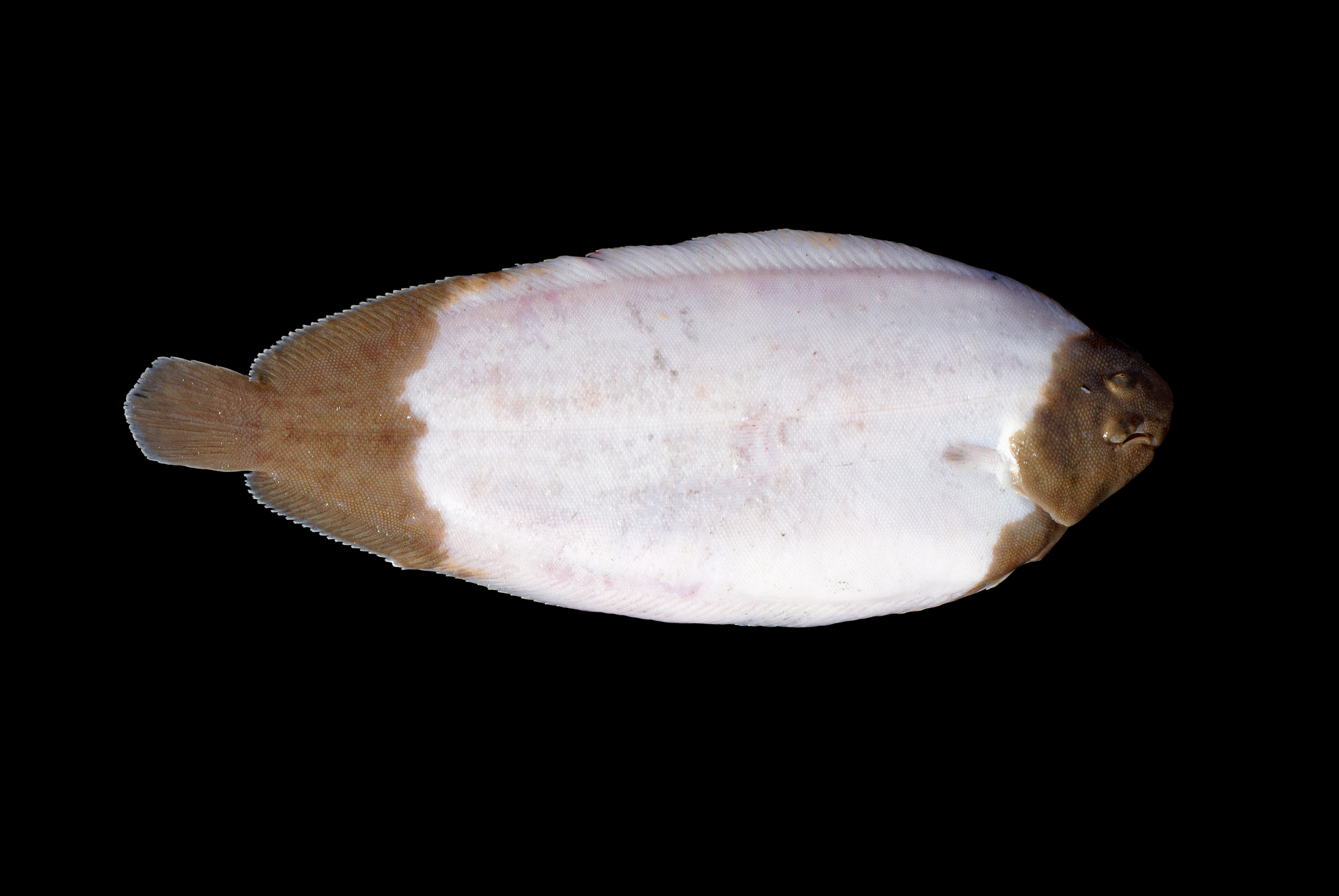
Semialbino sole from the North Sea

It has a preference for relatively shallow water (10–60 m) with sand or mud covering the bottom. They can be found at depths up to 200 m. Their preferred temperature range is from 8–24 °C.

It is found in the Eastern Atlantic Ocean, from the south of Norway to Senegal, and in almost all of the Mediterranean Sea. In the winter, it withdraws to the somewhat warmer waters of the southern North Sea.

== Diet ==
The Dover sole feeds at night. Its diet consists of worms, molluscs and crustaceans.

== Lifecycle ==
The Dover sole reaches maturity at 3–5 years old, at which point they can begin to reproduce. Spawning usually occurs between February and May but in warmer areas it can also occur at the beginning of winter. It usually happens in shallow coastal waters that are between 6–12 °C.

After the eggs have been fertilised, the incubation period lasts around five days. The larvae become juvenile fish after around 35 days.

The maximum recorded age is 26 years old.

== Ecology ==
An ectoparasite of the common sole is the leech Hemibdella soleae. The larvae settle on the upper surface of the fish, the only part not buried in the sediment, and after further development migrate to the underside, where they attach themselves with their suckers, feeding on the fish's blood.

== Cuisine ==
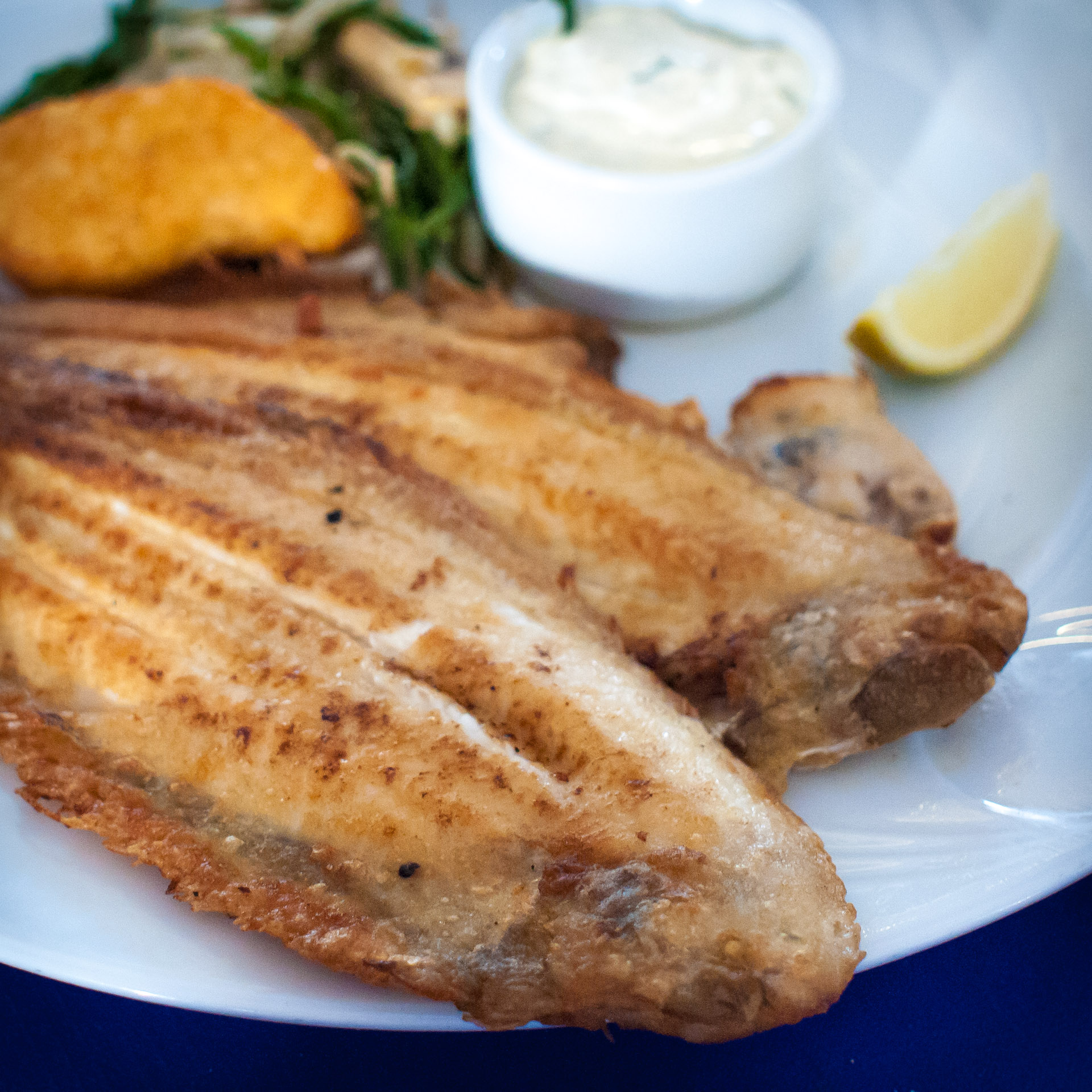
"Slip" fried in butter is popular in Dutch cuisine

Chefs prize Dover sole for its mild, buttery, sweet flavour and versatility, and for its ease of filleting. The fish yields fillets that hold together well in a variety of recipes.

== Sustainability ==
In 2010, Greenpeace International added the common sole to its seafood red list. "The Greenpeace International seafood red list is a list of fish that are commonly sold in supermarkets around the world, and which have a very high risk of being sourced from unsustainable fisheries."

== Other species named "Dover sole" ==
Because of its prestige, the name "Dover sole" was borrowed to name the eastern Pacific species Microstomus pacificus, a quite distinct species with different culinary properties: the Pacific sole has thinner, less firm fillets and sells for a lower price.

== See also ==
- Sole meunière
