= Annulus (zoology) =

External circular ring found in segmented animals such as earthworms and leeches

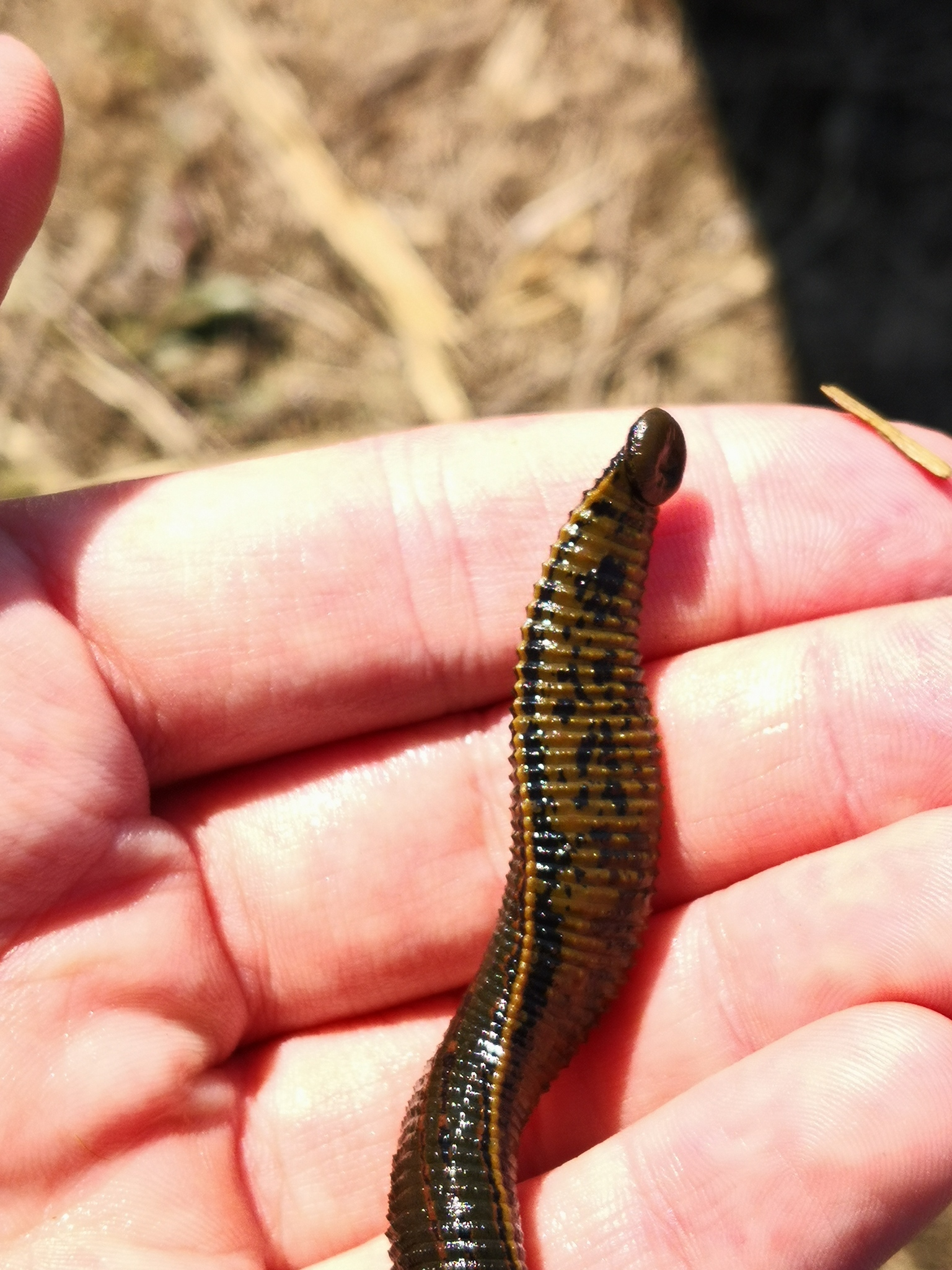
Leeches, like the one pictured here, have prominent annuli markings. They only have 32 segments, but may have many more annuli.

In zoology, an annulus is an external circular ring. Annuli are commonly found in segmented animals such as earthworms and leeches. The bodies of these annelids are externally marked by annuli that are arranged in series with each other.

An annulus may also be an indication of growth in certain species, similar to dendrochronology. For example, in fish, it is a series of concentric rings (or annuli) formed in the scales of bony fish. In bivalve mollusks, annuli are concentric growth rings in their shells.
