= Pigment spot ocellus =

The pigment spot ocellus is an ocellus that contains only part of its cells pigmented. It is characteristic of jellyfish, sea stars, and flatworms.
