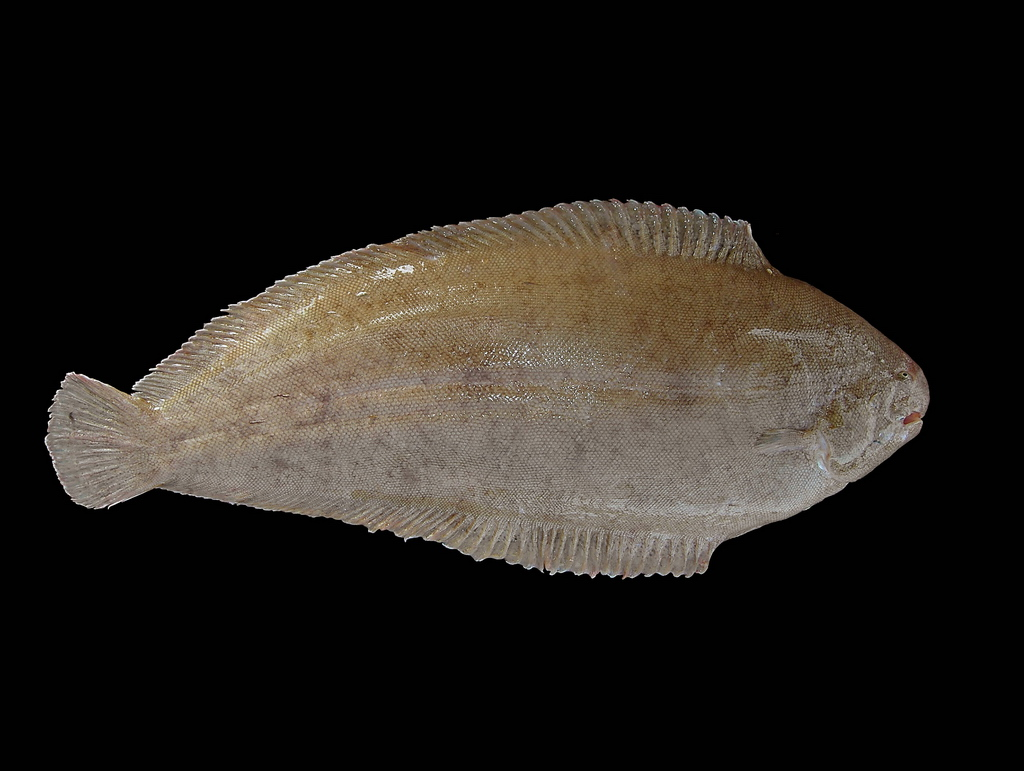
- Common sole (S. solea)

Scientific classification
- Kingdom: Animalia
- Phylum: Chordata
- Class: Actinopterygii
- Order: Carangiformes
- Suborder: Pleuronectoidei
- Family: Soleidae
- Genus: Solea; Quensel, 1806

Type species
- Solea solea (Linnaeus, 1758)

Synonyms
- Microbuglossus Günther, 1862

= Solea (fish) =

Solea Temporal range: Early Miocene–present

Genus of fishes

Solea is a genus of soles from the Indo-Pacific and East Atlantic Oceans, and the Mediterranean Sea.

== Species ==
The currently recognized species in this genus are:

- Solea aegyptiaca Chabanaud, 1927 (Egyptian sole)
- Solea capensis Gilchrist, 1902
- Solea elongata F. Day, 1877 (elongated sole)
- Solea heinii Steindachner, 1903
- Solea ovata J. Richardson, 1846 (ovate sole)
- Solea senegalensis Kaup, 1858 (Senegalese sole)
- Solea solea (Linnaeus, 1758) (common sole)
- Solea stanalandi J. E. Randall & McCarthy, 1989 (Stanaland's sole)
- Solea turbynei Gilchrist, 1904

The following fossil species are also known:

- †Solea cuneiformis (de Bosniaski, 1880) - Late Miocene (Messinian) of Algeria
- †Solea kirchbergana (von Meyer, 1848) - Early Miocene (Burdigalian) of Germany & Switzerland
