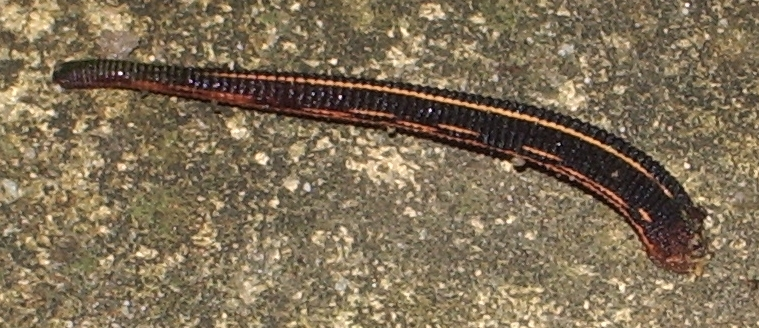
- A true leech in a Sydney suburb

Scientific classification
- Domain: Eukaryota
- Kingdom: Animalia
- Phylum: Annelida
- Clade: Pleistoannelida
- Clade: Sedentaria
- Class: Clitellata
- Subclass: Hirudinea
- Infraclass: Euhirudinea

Orders
- Arhynchobdellida; Rhynchobdellida

= Euhirudinea =

True leeches

True leeches

Euhirudinea, the true leeches, are an infraclass of the Hirudinea.

== Taxonomy ==
These clitellate annelids are of somewhat unclear relationships; namely the relationships of Hirudinea with oligochaetes are in need of revision. It may be that the presumed sister taxon of the Euhirudinea, the Acanthobdellidea, turns out to be more distantly related, as was already the case with the Branchiobdellida. Thus, eventually Euhirudinea might become a junior synonym of Hirudinea.

True leeches are subdivided into two groups, the Arhynchobdellida or Arhynchobdellae (proboscisless leeches), and the Rhynchobdellida or Rhynchobdellae (jawless leeches). Note that the lack of jaws is a plesiomorphy, while the presence of a proboscis is an apomorphy – not all Arhynchobdellida have jaws, but all Rhynchobdellida have a proboscis. The best-known leech species, Hirudo medicinalis (European Medical Leech), belongs to the Arhynchobdellida.

== Ecology ==
Euhirudinea leeches tend to hunt for nutrients in the morning or afternoon. Leeches that hunt in the morning are found in larger sizes than those who hunt in the afternoon. Therefore, feeding in the morning seems to be more nutritious for the leeches than in the afternoon. Terrestrial Euhirudinea leeches, which inhabit tropical or subtropical environments have been found a greater number on-trails compared to off-trail numbers.
