= Microchirus azevia =

Conservation status
- Data Deficient (IUCN 3.1)

Scientific classification
- Kingdom: Animalia
- Phylum: Chordata
- Class: Actinopterygii
- Order: Carangiformes
- Suborder: Pleuronectoidei
- Family: Soleidae
- Genus: Microchirus
- Species: M. azevia

Binomial name
- Microchirus azevia (de Brito Capello, 1867)

Synonyms
- Quenselia azevia (de Brito Capello, 1867); Solea azevia de Brito Capello, 1867

Species of fish

Microchirus azevia, commonly known as the bastard sole, is a species of flatfish in the family Soleidae. It is found on the continental slope of the eastern Atlantic Ocean and the Mediterranean Sea at depths down to about 250 m (800 ft).

== Description ==
The bastard sole grows to a standard length of about 40 cm (16 in). It is oval in outline, with a long ribbon-like dorsal fin with 71 to 86 soft rays, and a similar-shaped anal fin with 57 to 68 soft rays. The rounded caudal fin is separate from the dorsal and anal fins. In adults, the side of the fish with both eyes is sand-coloured or grey, but in juveniles there are additionally five or six eyespots; the other side of the fish is whitish.

== Distribution and habitat ==
The bastard sole is native to the eastern Atlantic Ocean and the western part of the Mediterranean Sea. In the Atlantic its range extends from Portugal to Senegal, with a single record from the south west of England, while in the Mediterranean it is restricted to the coasts of Spain. Morocco and Algeria. Its depth range is from just below the littoral zone down to about 250 m (800 ft).

== Ecology ==
M. azevia is a demersal (bottom-dwelling) fish and is found on both sandy and muddy substrates. The diet consists of small invertebrates plucked off the seabed such as amphipods and polychaete worms.

== Status ==
No major threats have been identified for this fish. Most of the countries in whose coastal waters it is found have regulations restricting trawling in certain areas. The bastard sole is uncommon and is not a target species for the fisheries along the coast, but may be caught as bycatch and may then be discarded. The population size and trend of this fish are unknown as no species-specific records are kept, so the International Union for Conservation of Nature has rated its conservation status as being "data deficient".
