= Adolph Eduard Grube =

German zoologist (1812–1880)

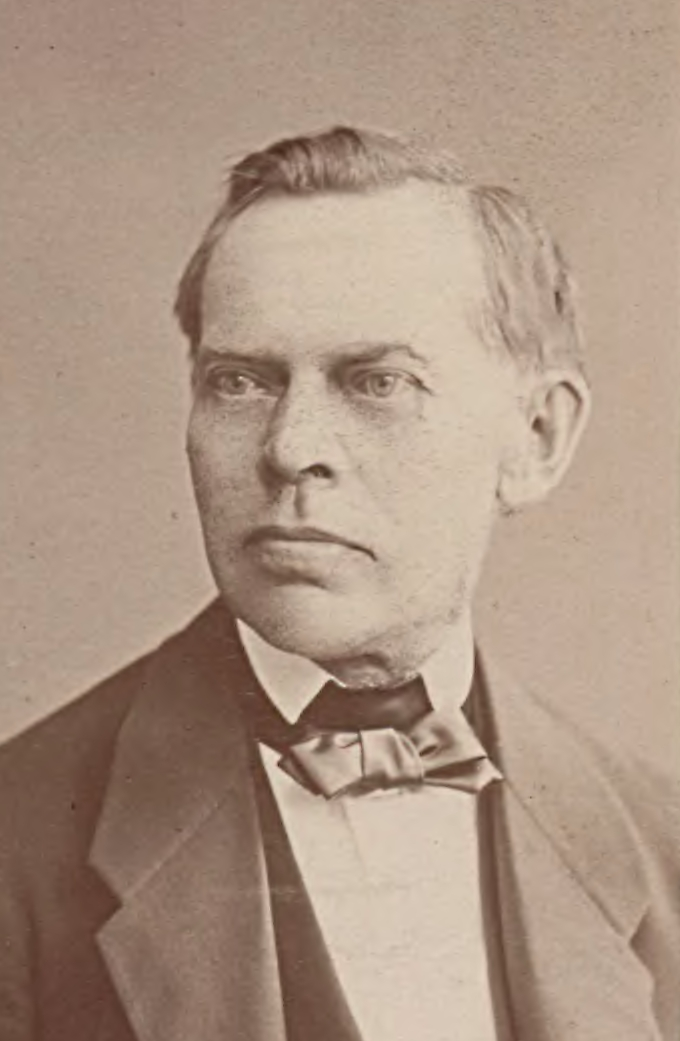
Adolph Eduard Grube

Adolph Eduard Grube (18 May 1812, in Königsberg – 23 June 1880, in Breslau) was a German zoologist. He served as a professor at the University of Dorpat before moving to Wrocław.

== Life and work ==
Grube was born in Königsberg (Królewiec) to lawyer Karl Eduard (1783–1833) and Ernestine Luise née Mertens (1788–1857) and went to the Collegium Fridericianum before entering university. He was attracted to natural history thanks to a teacher named Bulack. At university he attended the comparative anatomy lectures of Karl Ernst von Baer and Karl Friedrich Burdach. He graduated in 1830 and continued to work on a doctorate with a dissertation on the vascular system of frogs in 1834. He then travelled to Italy and Sicily. He habilitated in 1836 at the University of Königsberg (then in Prussia) and became an associate professor in 1843. He married Józefina Schäfer, daughter of a Warsaw factory owner. In 1844 he accepted a professor position at Universität Dorpat (then in Livonia, now Tartu) where he influenced a number of students including Konstanty Górski and Benedykt Tadeusz Dybowski. When in 1856, a professor position opened up in the Universität Breslau (now the University of Wrocław) with the death of Johann Gravenhorst, he took the position. Here he helped expand the museum collections with polychaetes from Southeast Asia from Carl Semper, spiders from Siberia collected by Dybowski, and birds collected by H. A. Bernstein. He made collections trips in the Mediterranean, accompanied by Dybowski. He took a special interest in the Polychaetes and described more than 500 species. He worked on other invertebrate groups as well. He was one of the early scientific explorers of the Adriatic Sea. In 1864 he interevened in the trial of Benedykt Dybowski with Chancellor Bismarck and helped commute a death sentence on Dybowski, which was made into 12 years of exile.

During the January Uprising, Grube's son who worked in the Prussian army was put on trial for assisting people join insurgent forces. Ferdinand von Roemer married Grube's sister-in-law Katarzyna Schäfer. In 1863-64, Grube was rector for the University of Wrocław, and in 1859-60 and 1879-80 as dean. He died at Wrocław. Chirocephalus grubei and Eubranchipus grubii were named after him by Dybowski.

== Works ==
An incomplete list of publications includes:

- 1850. "Die Familien der Anneliden". Archiv für Naturgeschichte Berlin, 16(1): 249–364
- 1866 "Beschreibungen neuer von der Novara-Expedition mitgebrachter Anneliden und einer neuen landplanarie". Verhandlungen der kaiserlich-königlichen zoologisch-botanischen Gesellschaft in Wien 16: 173–184.
- 1866 "Eine neue Annelida, zunächst einer nordischen, in der Nähe der Ophelien und Scalibregmen zu stellenden Annelide, Euzonus arcticus". Jahresbericht der Schlesischen Gesellschaft für vaterländische Kultur 43: 64–65.
- 1866 "Neue Anneliden aus den Gattungen Eunice, Hesione, Lamprophaes, und Travisia". Jahresbericht der Schlesischen Gesellschaft für vaterländische Kultur 44: 64-66.
- 1866 "Resultate einer Revision der Euniceen". Jahresbericht der Schlesischen Gesellschaft für vaterländische Kultur 44: 66–68.
- 1872. "Über die Gattung Lycastis und ein par neue Arten derselben". Jahres-Bericht Schleis. Gesell. 49:47–48.

== See also ==
- Category:Taxa named by Adolph Eduard Grube
