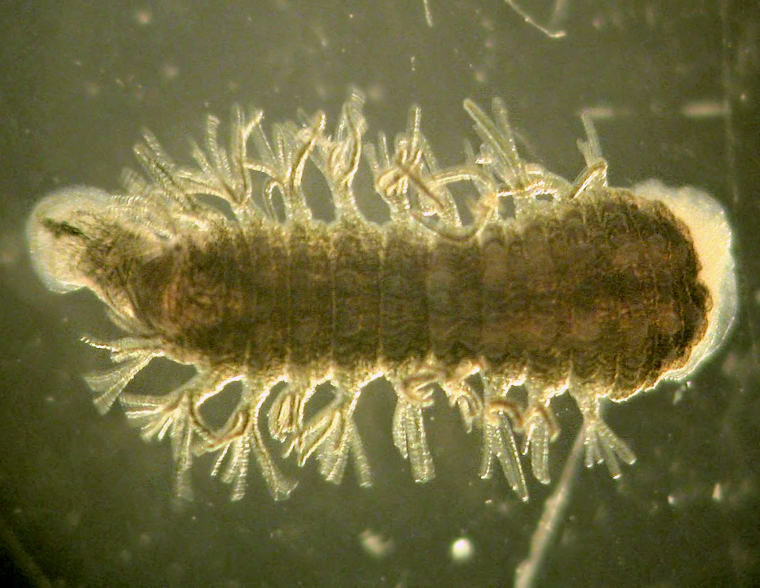
- Ozobranchus jantseanus, length ca. 7mm.

Scientific classification
- Kingdom: Animalia
- Phylum: Annelida
- Clade: Pleistoannelida
- Clade: Sedentaria
- Class: Clitellata
- Subclass: Hirudinea
- Order: Rhynchobdellida
- Family: Ozobranchidae; Pinto, 1921
- Genus: Ozobranchus; Quatrefages, 1852

Species
- ?Ozobranchus branchiatus (Menzies, 1791); Ozobranchus jantseanus Oka, 1912; Ozobranchus margoi (Apáthy, 1890); ?Ozobranchus polybranchus Sanjeeva Raj, 1951

= Turtle leech =

Ozobranchus

Genus of annelid worms

Turtle leeches are a genus, Ozobranchus, of leeches (Hirudinea) that feed exclusively on the blood of turtles. Only two species—Ozobranchus margoi and Ozobranchus branchiatus—are found in the Atlantic coast of the United States and the Gulf of Mexico. Little is known about these leeches due to difficulties in studying their sea turtle hosts.

== Physiology ==
Species of Ozobranchus spp. can be very small (down to a few millimeters in length), making them morphologically difficult to distinguish. Ozobranchus margoi and Ozobranchus branchiatus are the most anatomically documented. According to researchers from the University of Wales and the Gulf Coast Research Lab in Mississippi, the two species are very similar externally with their main difference being the number of pairs of finger-shaped gills; Ozobranchus margoi has 5 pairs while Ozobranchus branchiatus has 7. Both possess a light or slightly pink coloration and sometimes dark spots form from ingested blood visible through the epidermis. Ozobranchus branchiatus range generally from 3.5–10 mm, while Ozobranchus margoi generally range from 4–22 mm. The body is composed primarily of two unequal annuli. Both species have large suckers on each end of their bodies. The sucker on the anterior is not distinguishable from the neck. The anterior end also has two light-sensitive eye spots. The finger-like gills tend to get smaller as they progress towards the posterior end. Another of the species, Ozobranchus jantseanus, was studied by Japanese researchers who found it could adapt to extreme cold, surviving for 24 hours at -196 °C (-321 °F) and for nine months at -90 °C (-130 °F).

== Reproduction ==
Like other leeches, Ozobranchus spp. are hermaphrodites with separate male and female reproductive systems. As hermaphrodites, they have both testes and ovaries. Unlike some hermaphrodites, however, leeches cannot self-fertilize. They have four pairs of testes connected to various ducts and to an external gonopore with an eversible penis controlled by a muscular bulb. The gonopore also functions as a receptacle for sperm with a connection to the ovaries. Ozobranchus spp. lay eggs like leeches. Ozobranchus branchiatus are known to lay eggs directly on their host and cementing their cocoons on the host species.

== Life cycle ==
Due to the difficulties in studying sea turtles, relatively little is known about the life cycle of Ozobranchus spp. It is not fully understood if these leeches are capable of surviving independently of a turtle host for any extensive period of time. It is also unknown if they can feed off of organisms other than turtles, although the possibility was indicated by the discovery of a single Ozobranchus margoi specimen on a longbeaked dolphin. Ozobranchus branchiatus are known to complete their entire life cycle on host turtles, which is an unusual trait shared only by a few other species of leeches. This is accomplished by laying eggs on the turtle and attaching them with a cementing substance. The eggs will hatch and attach to the host turtle. Ozobranchus margoi has also been observed to lay eggs directly on heavily infested turtles in the event of an epizootic.

== Parasitism on turtles ==
=== Blood extraction ===
Ozobranchus branchiatus are historically known to only host on green turtles (Chelonia mydas), while Ozobranchus margoi targets multiple sea turtle species but are found mostly on loggerhead turtles (Caretta caretta) and, in one special case, on the long-beaked common dolphin. The leeches attach themselves on the mouth, neck, cloaca, and the undersides of the flippers of turtles. Once there, they use the same technique for blood extraction as other sanguivorous leeches: opening of a small wound, usage of an anticoagulant to prevent blood clotting, and ingestion of the blood.

=== Epizootics ===
Occasionally, as a scientific journal reported in 1974, overwhelming infestations of leeches called "epizootics" occur. Frank J Schwartz of the University of North Carolina's Institute of Marine Sciences described it thusly:

[T]he largest females were so devastated that their eyes had been eaten away to reveal the internal bone and skull. Leeches filled every possible crevice, nostrils, mouth, flippers, cloaca, etc. Large masses of leeches clung over all the body including the carapace. Three of the four females [. . .] and a 36-kg male succumbed between 24 July and 2 August. All turtles stopped feeding during the height of the epizootic.

=== Vector organism ===
Apart from the direct damage they inflict on the turtles, Ozobranchus spp. are suspected by scientists to transfer diseases to turtles. Fibropapillomatosis, a neoplastic sea turtle disease associated with a turtle herpesvirus (FPTHV), is suspected to be transferred between turtles by a vector organism: specifically, Ozobranchus spp. In a study conducted by several members of Cornell University's Department of Microbiology and Immunology and United States Government employees, high viral loads of FPTHV were found in Ozobranchus spp. specimens, implicating it as a possible mechanical vector for transmission of the disease.

== Genetic barcoding ==
The difficulties in applying common taxonomic techniques to identify leeches, especially to mature specimens, have led to the application of DNA barcoding using the cytochrome c oxidase I gene (COI) for identification purposes. A team of scientists from Wright State University, the University of Central Florida, and the Inwater Research Group collected and analyzed several Ozobranchus margoi and Ozobranchus branchiatus leeches. The specimens were first morphologically identified based upon the number of gills. Afterwards, genomic DNA was extracted from leech tissue far from the digestive tract in order to avoid contamination from turtle host's blood. The COI gene was sequenced from the extracted genomic DNA using polymerase chain reaction. These sequences were added to GenBank, which prior to the study did not have any genetic data on Ozobranchus branchiatus.
