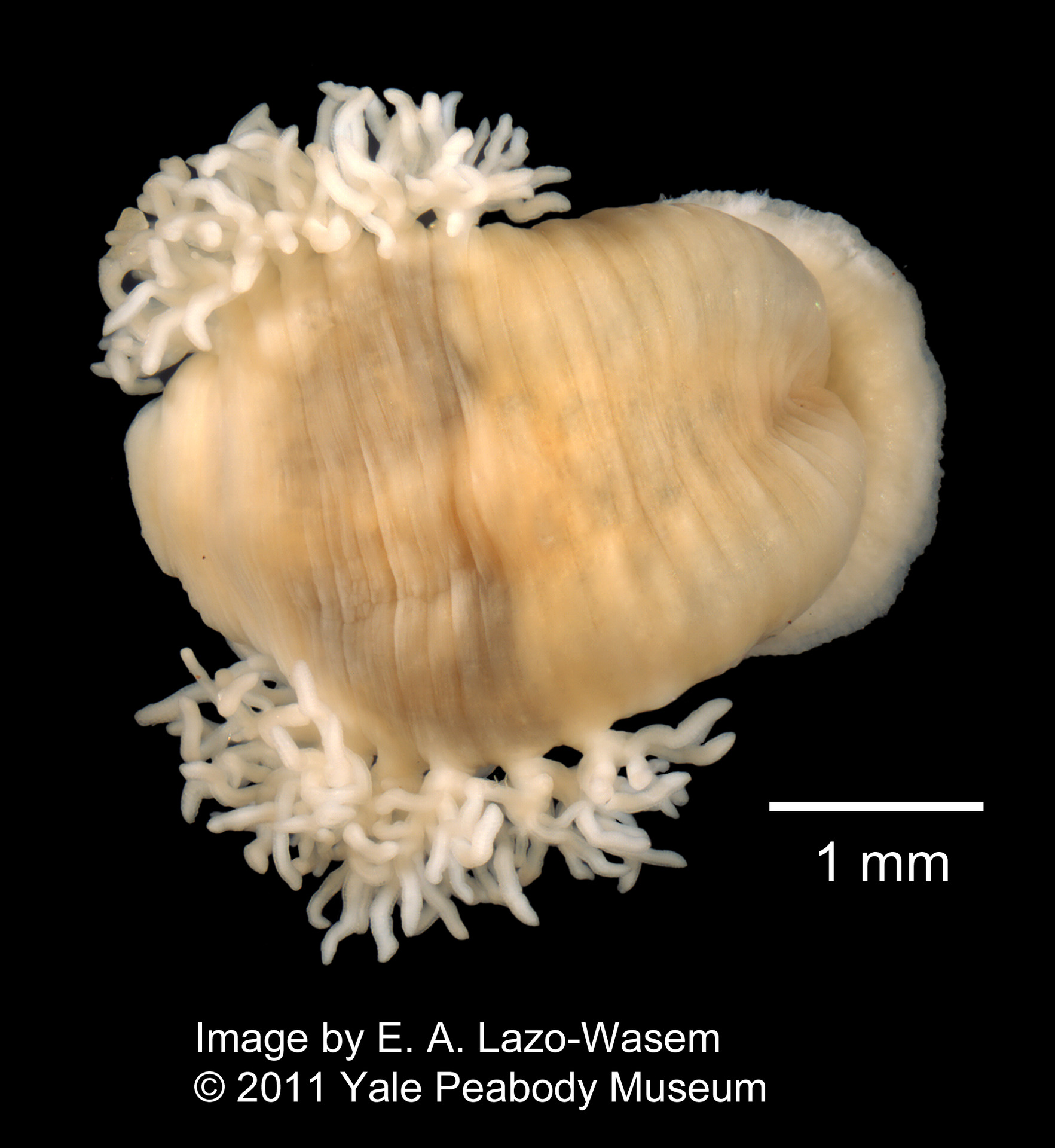
- Ozobranchus branchiatus

Scientific classification
- Kingdom: Animalia
- Phylum: Annelida
- Clade: Pleistoannelida
- Clade: Sedentaria
- Class: Clitellata
- Subclass: Hirudinea
- Order: Rhynchobdellida
- Family: Ozobranchidae
- Genus: Ozobranchus
- Species: O. branchiatus

Binomial name
- Ozobranchus branchiatus (Menzies, 1791)

Synonyms
- Hirudo branchiatus Menzies, 1791

= Ozobranchus branchiatus =

Species of annelid worm

Ozobranchus branchiatus is a species of leech in the family Ozobranchidae. It is found in the Atlantic Ocean and is a permanent parasite of sea turtles, mostly the green sea turtle (Chelonia mydas).

== Description ==
This leech is somewhat dorso-ventrally flattened and is about 13 mm (0.5 in) in length. The anterior (head) end is narrow and is armed with a sucker with which the leech holds onto the turtle host. This end also bears a mouth on the underside near the sucker and a pair of eyes on the fifth annulation. The trunk is much broader than the head and bears seven pairs of digitate gills. It terminates with a sucker, the diameter of which is as broad as the maximum width of the body. This leech is a creamy colour.

== Distribution ==
Ozobranchus branchiatus is found on the eastern coast of North America, its range extending from Cape Hatteras in North Carolina, southwards round the coast of Florida to the western Caribbean Sea and the Gulf of Mexico. However, the leech can travel wherever its host turtle goes, and one such turtle was observed in the Persian Gulf.

== Ecology ==
This leech is found almost exclusively on the green sea turtle (Chelonia mydas), but it occasionally occurs on other species of turtle. A green sea turtle in the Persian Gulf was found to have about 1400 leeches of this species, about 300 in each of the axillary and inguinal areas beneath the limbs, and about 200 on the throat, in front of the intergular scute. Also present on this turtle were some crustacean eggs and many barnacles on the carapace, but the turtle did not seem inconvenienced by this burden.

This leech has been implicated as a vector of the fibropapilloma virus (FPTHV), a herpesvirus that causes lethal tumour growths on various parts of the turtle's body.
