= Kuroshima Research Station =

Marine research institute in Okinawa, Japan

- Founded: 1973
- Headquarters: Okinawa, Japan, Kuroshima

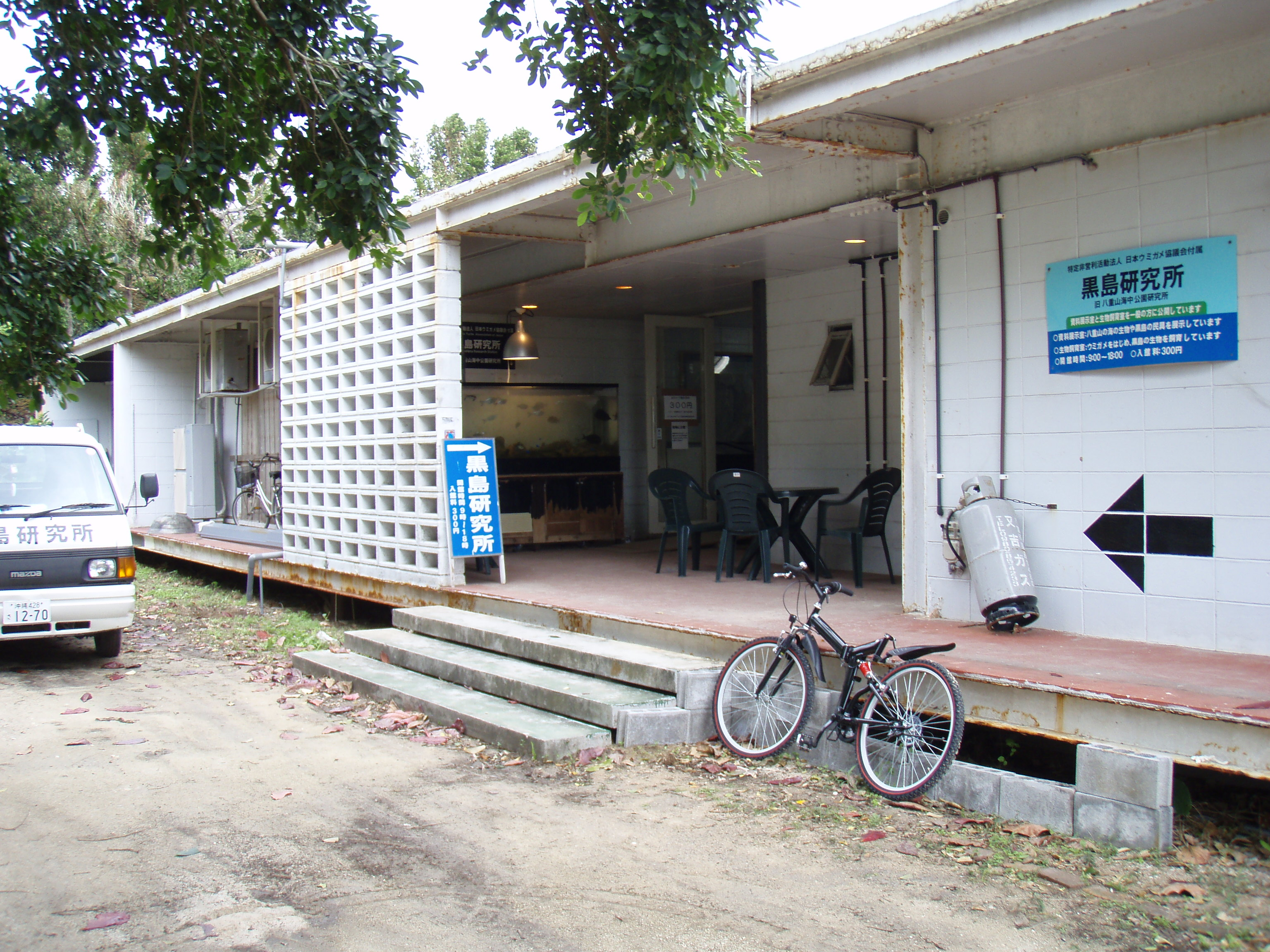
Kuroshima Research Institute

Kuroshima Research Station is a marine research institute in Okinawa, Japan, located on the island of Kuroshima. (黒島)

It was established in 1973 as the Yaeyama Marine Park Research Institute, for the purpose of managing and utilising the marine park area in Sekisei (石西) lagoon between Ishigaki (石垣) Island and Iriomote (西表) Island including Kuroshima Island.

From the beginning, it worked as an ocean research station, and existed until 2002 under the financial support of Nagoya Railroad Business Operations Co. Ltd.

At present, Kuroshima Research Station belongs to the NPO Sea Turtle Association of Japan, which took over the activities of the institute.

== Activities ==
Some of the institutes activities include 30 years’ research into the nesting of sea turtles, including confirmation of the nesting of the hawksbill sea turtle for the first time in Japan, and confirming the nesting of green sea turtles. They have also researched acanthasters and corals.

In 2005, they sponsored the Japanese Sea Turtle Conference, which is held every year at the location of sea turtles nesting rookeries in Japan.
