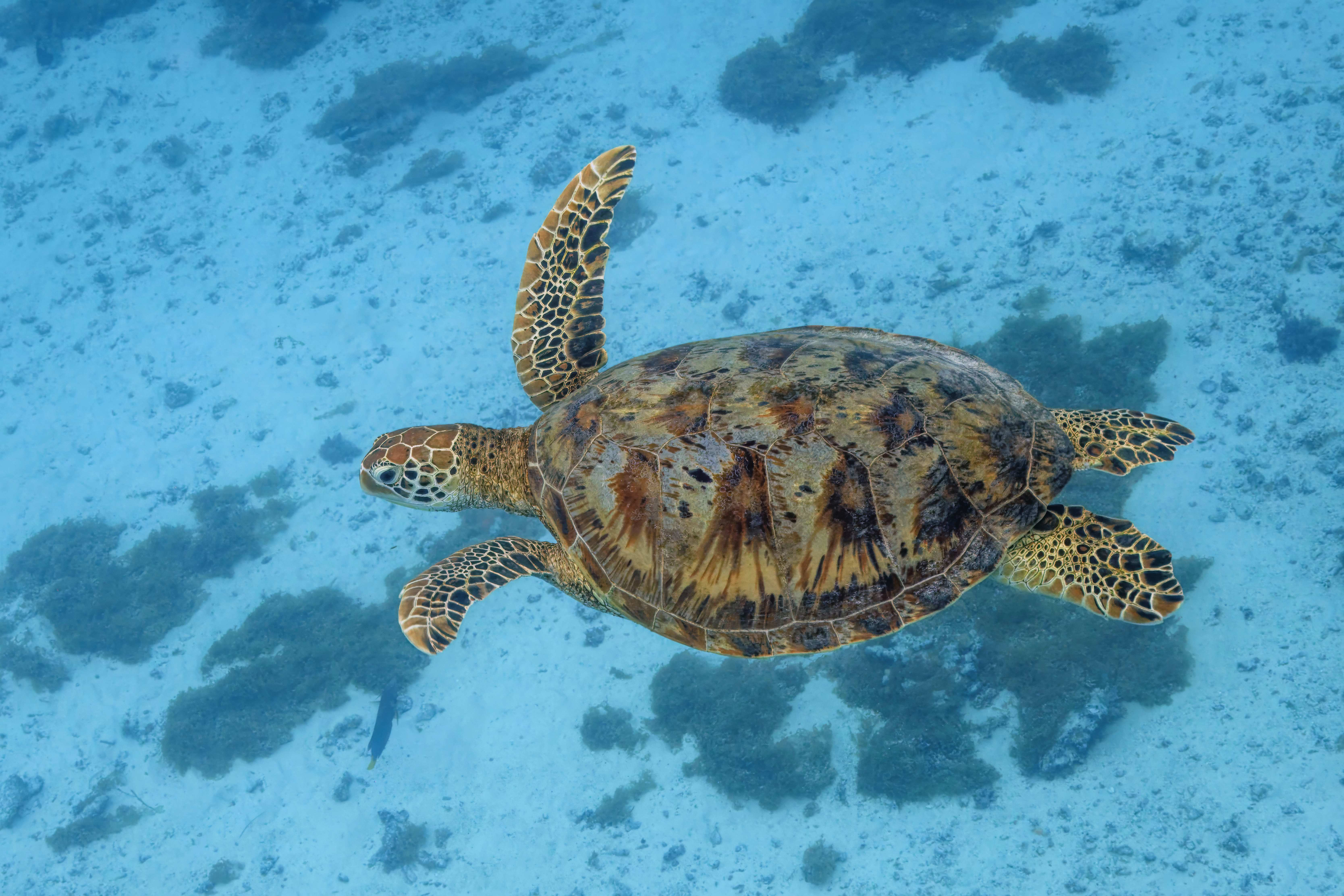
- At Moorea, French Polynesia

Conservation status
- Least Concern (IUCN 3.1)
- CITES Appendix I

Scientific classification
- Kingdom: Animalia
- Phylum: Chordata
- Class: Reptilia
- Order: Testudines
- Suborder: Cryptodira
- Family: Cheloniidae
- Subfamily: Cheloniinae
- Genus: Chelonia; Brongniart, 1800
- Species: C. mydas

Binomial name
- Chelonia mydas (Linnaeus, 1758)

Synonyms
- Species synonymy: Testudo mydas Linnaeus, 1758; Testudo macropus Walbaum, 1782 (nomen illegitimum); Testudo viridis Schneider, 1783; Testudo japonica Thunberg, 1787; Testudo marina vulgaris Lacépède, 1788; Testudo viridisquamosa Lacépède, 1788; Testudo mydas macropus Suckow, 1798; Chelonia mydas — Brongniart, 1800; Testudo chloronotos Bechstein, 1800; Testudo cepediana Daudin, 1801; Testudo rugosa Daudin, 1801; Chelone mydas — Brongniart, 1805; Chelonia japonica — Schweigger, 1812; Chelonia virgata Schweigger, 1812; Caretta cepedii Merrem, 1820; Caretta esculenta Merrem, 1820; Caretta thunbergii Merrem, 1820; Caretta mydas — Fitzinger, 1826; Caretta virgata — Fitzinger, 1826; Chelonia lachrymata Cuvier, 1829; Chelonia maculosa Cuvier, 1829; Chelonia midas [sic] Wagler, 1830 (ex errore); Chelonia mydas var. japonica — Gray, 1831; Chelonia esculenta — Wiegmann & Ruthe, 1832; Chelonia bicarinata Lesson, 1834; Chelonia marmorata A.M.C. Duméril & Bibron, 1835; Chelonia (Chelonia) cepedeana [sic] Fitzinger, 1835 (ex errore); Chelonia viridis — Temminck & Schlegel, 1835; Mydas mydas — Cocteau, 1838; Mydasea mydas — Gervais, 1843; Euchelonia mydas — Tschudi, 1846; Megemys mydas — Gistel, 1848; Chelonia lacrymata [sic] Agassiz, 1857 (ex errore); Chelonia formosa Girard, 1858; Chelonia tenuis Girard, 1858; Euchelys macropus — Girard, 1858; Chelone macropus — Strauch, 1862; Chelone maculosa — Strauch, 1862; Chelone marmorata — Strauch, 1862; Chelone virgata — Strauch, 1862; Chelone viridis — Strauch, 1862; Chelonia albiventer Nardo, 1864; Thalassiochelys albiventer — Günther, 1865; Chelonia agassizii Bocourt, 1868; Mydas viridis — Gray, 1870; Chelone midas — Cope, 1871; Chelonia lata Philippi, 1887; Chelone mydas — Boulenger, 1889; Chelonia mydas mydas — Mertens & L. Müller, 1928; Caretta thunbergi [sic] H.M. Smith, 1931 (ex errore); Chelonia mydas agassizii — Carr, 1952; Chelonia mydas agassizi [sic] Schmidt, 1953 (ex errore); Chelonia mydas carrinegra Caldwell, 1962; Chelonia agazisii [sic] Tamayo, 1962 (ex errore); Testudo nigrita Tamayo, 1962; Chelonia agassizi — Carr, 1967; Chelonia mydus [sic] Nutaphand, 1979 (ex errore); Chelonia mydas carinegra [sic] Nutaphand, 1979 (ex errore); Testudo chloronotus [sic] H.M. Smith & R.B. Smith, 1980 (ex errore); Chelone albiventer — Márquez, 1990; Caretta thumbergii [sic] Sharma, 1998 (ex errore); Chelonia mydas viridis — Karl & Bowen, 1999

= Green sea turtle =

Green sea turtles Temporal range: 0.21–0 Ma

Species of large sea reptile

The green sea turtle (Chelonia mydas), also known as the green turtle, black sea turtle, and Pacific green turtle, is a species of large sea turtle of the family Cheloniidae. It is the only species in the genus Chelonia. Its range extends throughout tropical and subtropical seas around the world, with two distinct populations in the Atlantic and Pacific Oceans, but it is also found in the Indian Ocean. The common name refers to the usually green fat found beneath its carapace, due to its diet strictly being seagrass, not to the color of its carapace, which is olive to black.

The dorsoventrally flattened body of C. mydas is covered by a large, teardrop-shaped carapace; it has a pair of large, paddle-like flippers. It is usually lightly colored, although in the eastern Pacific populations, parts of the carapace can be almost black. Unlike other members of its family, such as the hawksbill sea turtle, C. mydas is mostly herbivorous. The adults usually inhabit shallow lagoons, feeding mostly on various species of seagrasses. The green sea turtle is the only aquatic turtle species which is herbivorous when fully grown.

Like other sea turtles, green sea turtles migrate long distances between feeding grounds and hatching beaches. Many islands worldwide are known as Turtle Island due to green sea turtles nesting on their beaches. Females crawl out on beaches, dig nests, and lay eggs during the night. Later, hatchlings emerge, and scramble into the water. Those that reach maturity may live to 90 years in the wild.

C. mydas was listed as endangered by the IUCN and CITES until 2025 and is protected from exploitation in most countries. It is illegal to collect, harm, or kill them. In addition, many countries have laws and ordinances to protect nesting areas. However, turtles are still in danger due to human activity. In some countries, turtles and their eggs are still hunted for food. Pollution indirectly harms turtles at both population and individual scales. Many turtles die after being caught in fishing nets. In addition, real estate development often causes habitat loss by eliminating nesting beaches.

== Taxonomy ==
The green sea turtle is a member of the tribe Cheloniini. A 1993 study clarified the status of genus Chelonia with respect to the other marine turtles. The carnivorous Eretmochelys (hawksbill), Caretta (loggerhead) and Lepidochelys (ridley) were assigned to the tribe Carettini. Herbivorous Chelonia warranted their status as a genus, while Natator (flatback) was further removed from the other genera than previously believed.

The species was originally described by Carl Linnaeus in his landmark 1758 10th edition of Systema Naturae as Testudo mydas. In 1868, Marie Firmin Bocourt named a particular species of sea turtle Chelonia agassizii, in honor of Swiss-American zoologist Louis Agassiz. This "species" was referred to as the "black sea turtle". Later research determined Bocourt's "black sea turtle" was not genetically distinct from C. mydas, and thus taxonomically not a separate species. These two "species" were then united as Chelonia mydas and populations were given subspecies status: C. mydas mydas referred to the originally described population, while C. mydas agassizi referred only to the Pacific population known as the Galápagos green turtle. This subdivision was later determined to be invalid and all species members were then designated Chelonia mydas. The oft-mentioned name C. agassizi remains an invalid junior synonym of C. mydas.

=== Etymology ===
The species' common name does not derive from any particular green external coloration of the turtle. Its name comes from the greenish color of the turtles' fat, which is only found in a layer between their inner organs and their shell. As a species found worldwide, the green turtle has many local names. In the Hawaiian language it is called honu, and it is locally known as a symbol of good luck and longevity.

== Description ==
The tail is much longer in adult males

Its appearance is that of a typical sea turtle. C. mydas has a dorsoventrally flattened body, a beaked head at the end of a short neck, and paddle-like arms well-adapted for swimming. Adult green turtles grow to 1.5 metres (5 ft) long. The average weight of mature individuals is 68–190 kg (150–419 lb) and the average carapace length is 78–112 cm (31–44 in). They are considered the second largest sea turtle in the United States, after the leatherback sea turtle. Exceptional specimens can weigh 315 kg (694 lb) or even more, with the largest known C. mydas having weighed 395 kg (871 lb) and measured 153 cm (60 in) in carapace length.

Showing the serrated lower jaw, in a Galapagos mangrove lagoon

Anatomically, a few characteristics distinguish the green turtle from the other members of its family. Unlike its close relative the hawksbill turtle, the green turtle's snout is very short and its beak is unhooked. The neck cannot be pulled into the shell. The sheath of the turtle's upper jaw possesses a denticulated edge, while its lower jaw has stronger, serrated, more defined denticulation. The dorsal surface of the turtle's head has a single pair of prefrontal scales. Its carapace is composed of five central scutes flanked by four pairs of lateral scutes. Underneath, the green turtle has four pairs of inframarginal scutes covering the area between the turtle's plastron and its shell. Mature C. mydas front appendages have only a single claw (as opposed to the hawksbill two), although a second claw is sometimes prominent in young specimens.

The carapace of the turtle has various color patterns that change over time. Hatchlings of Chelonia mydas, like those of other marine turtles, have mostly black carapaces and light-colored plastrons. Carapaces of juveniles turn dark brown to olive, while those of mature adults are either entirely brown, spotted or marbled with variegated rays. Underneath, the turtle's plastron is hued yellow. C. mydas limbs are dark-colored and lined with yellow, and are usually marked with a large dark brown spot in the center of each appendage.

Carapace (left) and plastron (right)

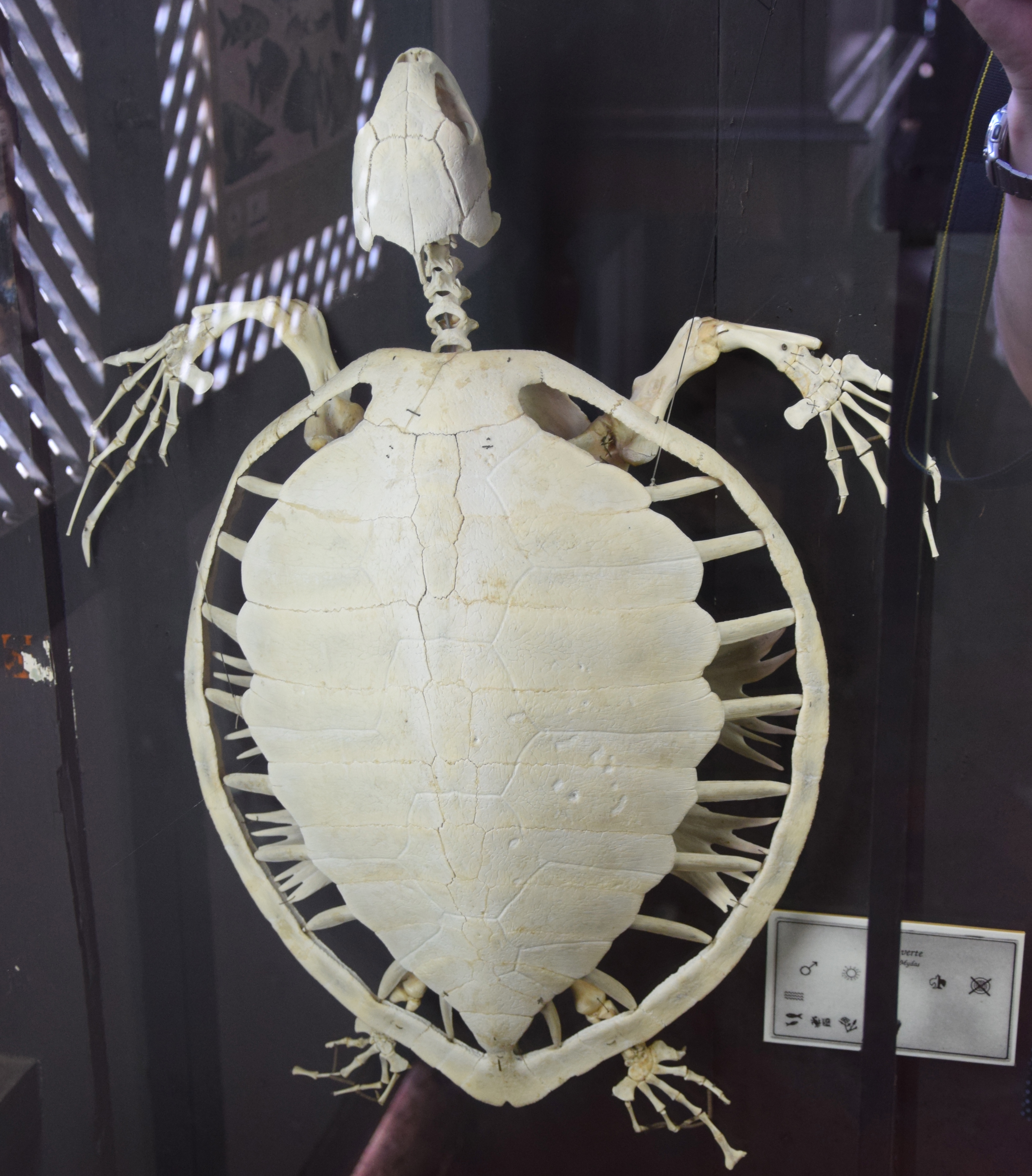
Skeleton

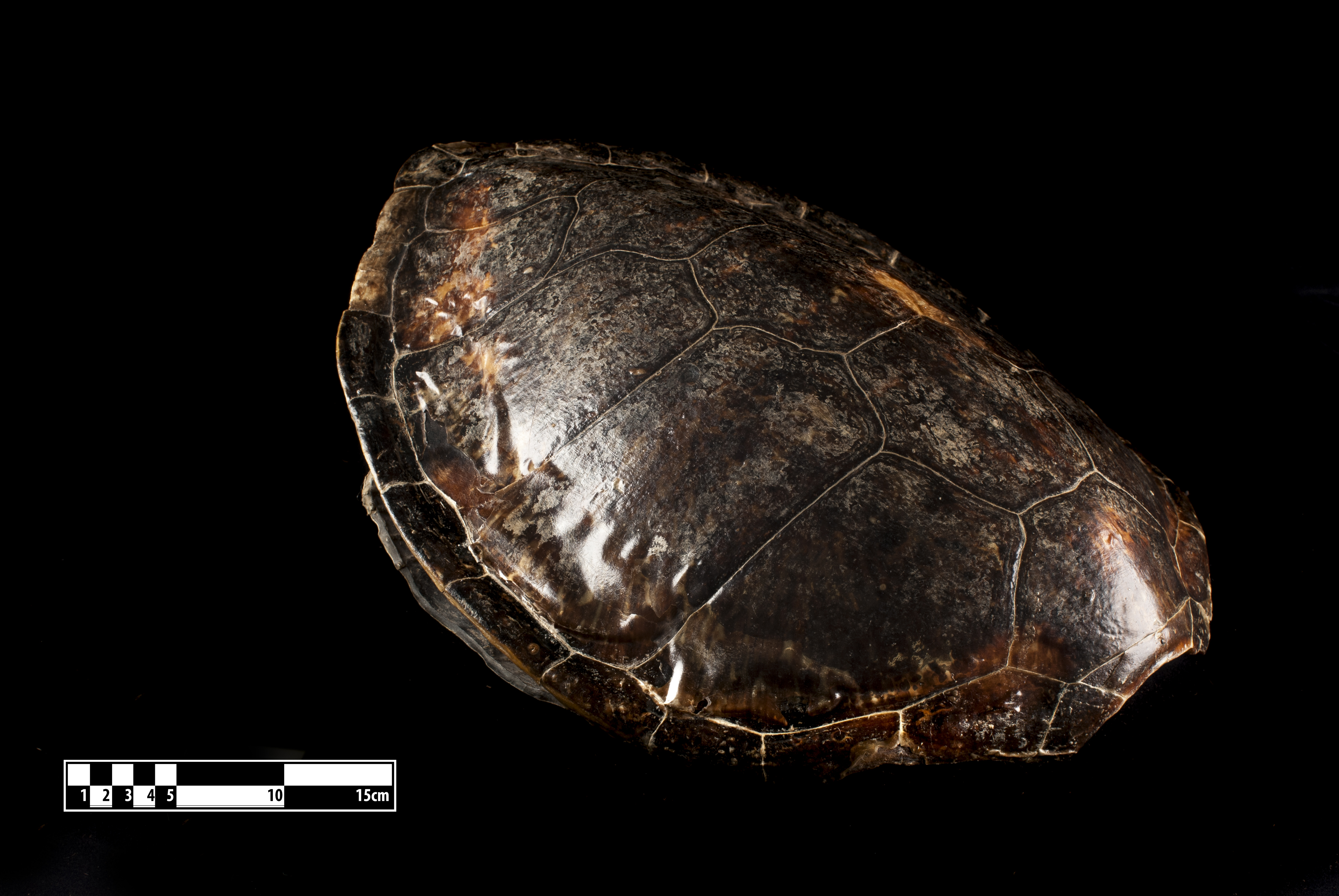
Taxidermied shell with scale bar

== Distribution ==
Green sea turtle nesting populations

Showing the scutes of the carapace and head, in Belize

The range of the green sea turtle extends throughout tropical and subtropical oceans worldwide. The two major subpopulations are the Atlantic and the eastern Pacific subpopulations. Each population is genetically distinct, with its own set of nesting and feeding grounds within the population's known range. One of the genetic differences between the two subpopulations is the type of mitochondrial DNA found in individual's cells. Individuals from rookeries in the Atlantic Ocean and Mediterranean Sea have a similar type of mitochondrial DNA, and individuals from the Pacific and Indian Oceans have another type of mitochondrial DNA. Their native range includes tropical to subtropical waters along continental coasts and islands between 30°N and 30°S. Since green sea turtles are a migrating species, their global distribution spans into the open ocean. The differences in mitochondrial DNA more than likely stems from the populations being isolated from each other by the southern tips of both South America and Africa with no warm waters for the green sea turtles to migrate through. The green sea turtle is estimated to inhabit coastal areas of more than 140 countries, with nesting sites in over 80 countries worldwide throughout the year. In the United States Atlantic coast, green sea turtles can be found from Texas to Massachusetts. In the United States Pacific coast, they have been found from southern California north to the southernmost tip of Alaska. The largest populations of green sea turtles within the United States coastline are in the Hawaiian Islands and Florida. Globally, the largest populations of sea turtles are in the Great Barrier Reef in Australia, and the Caribbean Sea. Recently these Turtles were discovered within Rangaunu Harbour in New Zealand.

=== Atlantic subpopulation ===
The green sea turtle can generally be found throughout the Atlantic Ocean. Although the species is most abundant in tropical climates, green sea turtles can also be found in temperate climates, and individuals have been spotted as far north as Canada in the western Atlantic, and the Cimbrian peninsula in the east. The subpopulation's southern range is known until past the southern tip of Africa in the east and Argentina in the western Atlantic. The major nesting sites can be found on various islands in the Caribbean, along the Atlantic coast of Florida in the United States, the eastern coast of the South American continent and most notably, on isolated North Atlantic islands.

In the Caribbean, major nesting sites have been identified on Aves Island, the U.S. Virgin Islands, Puerto Rico, the Dominican Republic, and Costa Rica. In recent years, there are signs of increased nesting in the Cayman Islands. One of the region's most important nesting grounds is in Tortuguero in Costa Rica. In fact, the majority of the Caribbean region's C. mydas population hails from a few beaches in Tortuguero. Within United States waters, minor nesting sites have been noted in the states of Georgia, North Carolina, and South Carolina. Florida's east coast is the largest nesting site in the United States. Hutchinson Island in particular is a major nesting area in Florida waters. Florida has several annual nesting periods when local beaches are closed or cordoned off to protect nesting sites. According to Green Sea Turtle Watch, in 2015 more than 37,000 green sea turtle nests were documented in Florida, a record number. In addition to sporadic distribution of nesting sites, feeding grounds are much more widely distributed throughout Florida. Important feeding grounds in Florida include Indian River Lagoon, the Florida Keys, Florida Bay, Homosassa, Crystal River, and Cedar Key.

Notable locations in South America include secluded beaches in Suriname and French Guiana. In the Southern Atlantic Ocean, the most notable nesting grounds for Chelonia mydas are found on the island of Ascension, which hosts 6,000–13,000 turtle nests.

=== Indo-Pacific subpopulation ===
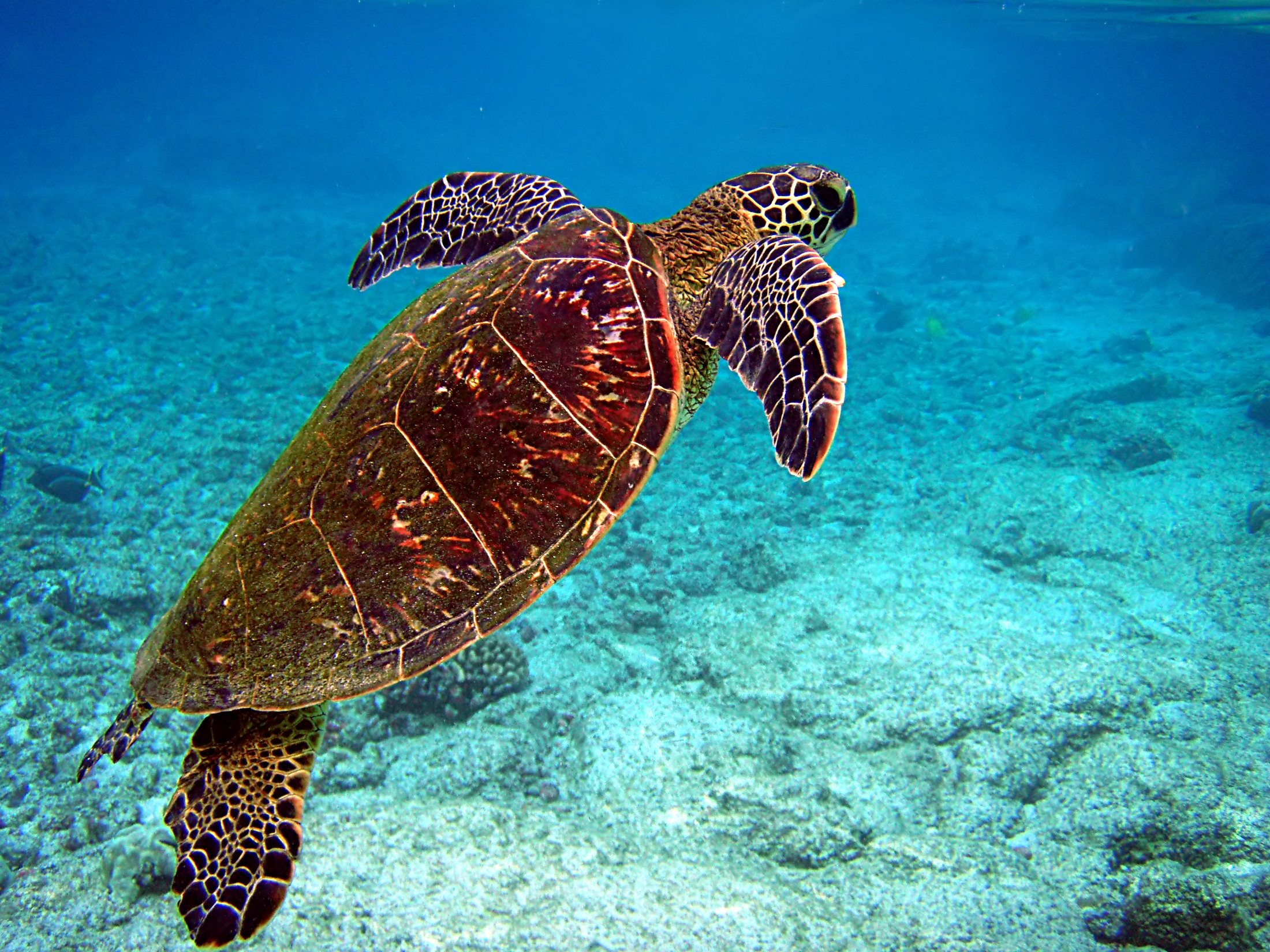
About to break the surface for air at Kona, Hawaii

In the Pacific, its range reaches as far north as the southern coast of Alaska and as far south as Chile in the east. The turtle's distribution in the western Pacific reaches north to Japan and southern parts of Russia's Pacific coast, and as far south as the northern tip of New Zealand and a few islands south of Tasmania. Significant nesting grounds are scattered throughout the entire Pacific region, including Mexico, the Hawaiian Islands, the South Pacific, the northern coast of Australia, and Southeast Asia. Major Indian Ocean nesting colonies include India, Pakistan, Sri Lanka and other coastal countries.

The turtles can also be found throughout the Indian Ocean; the east coast of the African continent hosts a few nesting grounds, including islands in the waters around Madagascar and Maldives.

==== Specific nesting grounds ====
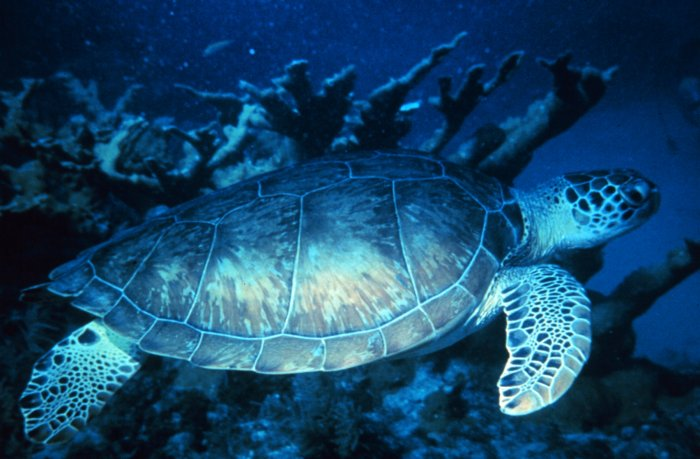
Photo of swimming turtle at twilight in a coral reef near Mexico

Nesting grounds are found all along the Mexican coast. These turtles feed in seagrass pastures in the Gulf of California. Green turtles belonging to the distinct Hawaiian subpopulation nest at the protected French Frigate Shoals some 800 kilometers (500 mi) west of the Hawaiian Islands.

In the Philippines, green turtles nest in the Turtle Islands along with closely related hawksbill turtles. In December 2007, fishermen using a hulbot-hulbot (a type of fish net) accidentally caught an 80 kg (180 lb), 93 cm (37 in) long and 82 cm (32 in) wide turtle off Barangay Bolong, Zamboanga City, Philippines. December is breeding season near the Bolong beach.

An annual presence is recorded in the Gulf of Panama, on the Isla Parida island. Local activists also moving some turtle nests to the coast, in the vicinity of the small town of Malena, to save and increase the turtle population in the safe place.

Indonesia has a few nesting beaches, one in the Meru Betiri National Reserve in East Java.

Off the north-eastern and northern coasts of Australia, the Great Barrier Reef has two genetically distinct populations; one north and one south. Within the reef, 20 separate locations consisting of small islands and cays were identified as nesting sites for either population of C. mydas. Of these, the most important is on Raine Island. In the Torres Strait there is a large rookery on Bramble Cay. The Coral Sea has nesting areas of world significance.

Major nesting sites are common on either side of the Arabian Sea, both in Ash Sharqiyah, Oman, and along the coast of Karachi, Pakistan. Some specific beaches there, such as Hawke's Bay and Sandspit, are common to both C. mydas and L. olivacea subpopulation. Sandy beaches along Sindh and Balochistan are nesting sites. Some 25 kilometers (16 mi) off the Pakistani coast, Astola island is another nesting beach.

==== Galápagos green turtle ====
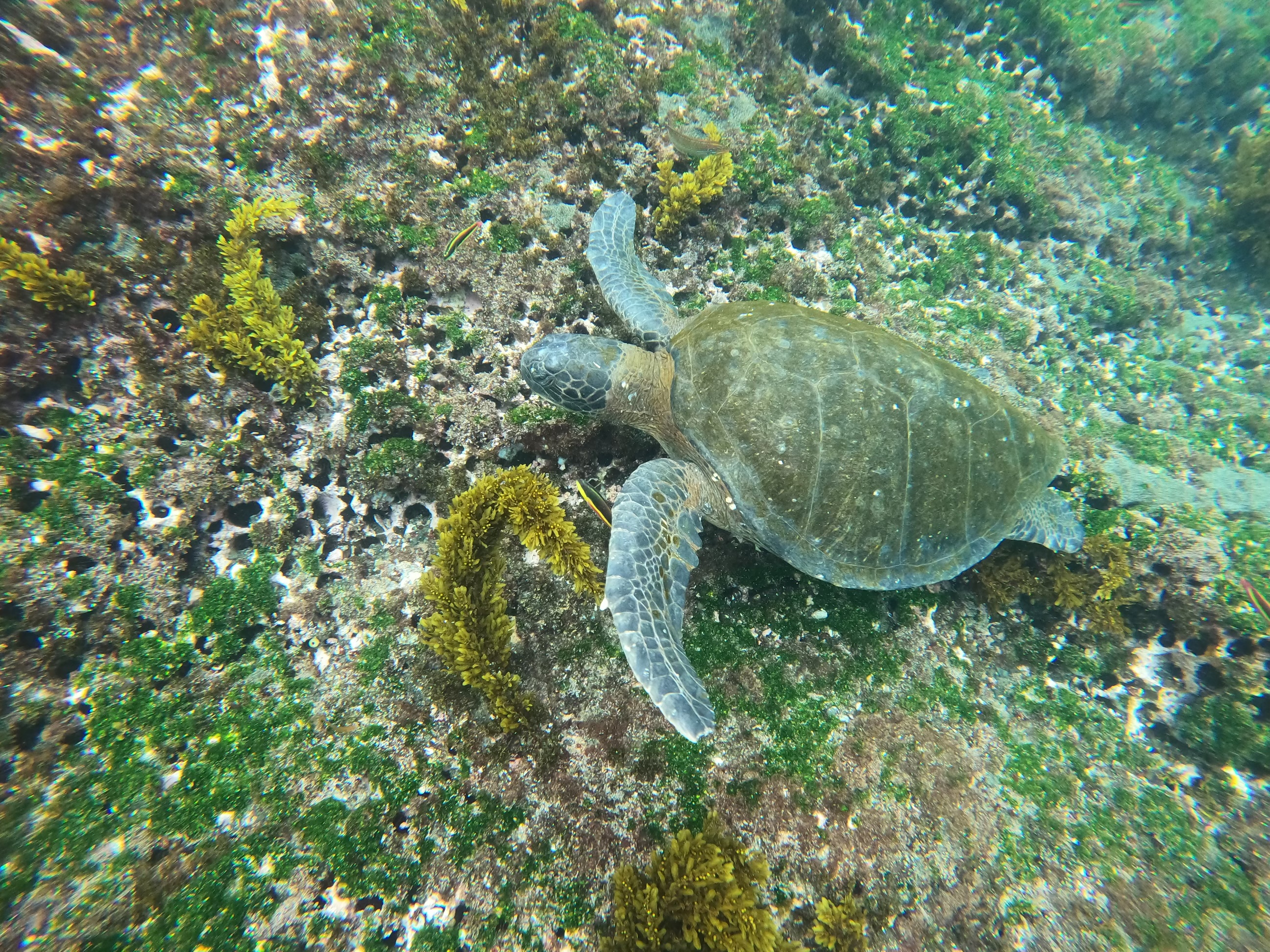
Green Sea Turtle Swimming in the Galápagos

The population that has often been known as the Galápagos green turtle have been recorded and observed in the Galápagos as far back as the 17th century by William Dampier. Not much attention has been paid to them due to the overwhelming research done on the Galápagos giant tortoises. Only over the last 30 years have extensive studies been performed covering the behaviors of the Galápagos green turtles. Much of the debate that has surrounded them recently is over the binomial classification of the species. At one point the name Chelonia agassizii was applied to this population as a separate species. Analysis of mitochondrial and nuclear DNA of 15 nesting beaches, however, has demonstrated that there is not only no significant distinction of this population but that it would be paraphyletic to recognise it. As such the species name Chelonia agassizzii is considered a junior synonym of Chelonia mydas as such it is considered as a local variant of the populations of the East Pacific waters and those of other nesting areas.

The morphological distinctiveness of the Galápagos green turtle has given rise to the debate, but evidence of taxonomic distinctiveness is best served using the combination of multiple datasets. The two most notable morphological distinctions are the considerably smaller adult size and the much darker pigmentation of the carapace, plastron, and extremities. Other distinctions are the curving of the carapace above each hind flipper, the more dome-shaped carapace, and the very long tail of adult males. Three possibilities have arisen from their unique characteristics: agassizii is a separate species from C. mydas, it is a subspecies of green sea turtle, or it is simply a color mutation. These facts have led to the debate over binomial separation however due to the significance of the DNA testing results there have been no distinctions made at this time. At a meeting for sea turtle scientists and their collaborators in 2000, the evidence for the taxonomic position of the Galápagos green turtle was reviewed and a majority among the participants supported treating it as a population or subspecies of the green turtle (instead of a separate species). However, this is possibly a case of political taxonomy. As such the three major international checklists that cover turtles of the world Reptile Database the checklist of Fritz and Havas (2007) and the IUCN Checklist (TTWG 2017) all consider this a junior synonym.

== Habitat ==
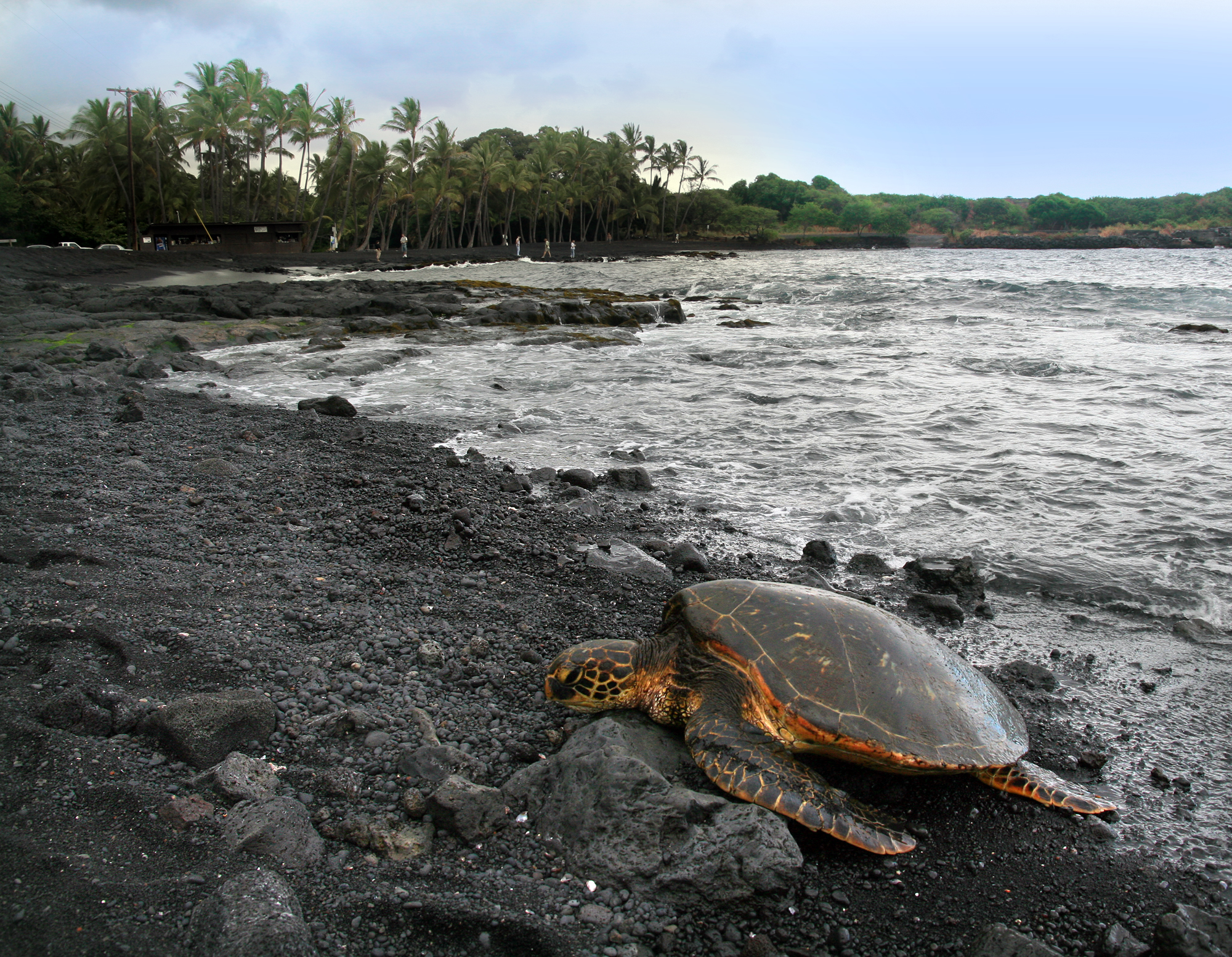
Green sea turtle on Punaluu black sand beach of Big Island, Hawaii.

Green sea turtles move across three habitat types, depending on their life stage. They lay eggs on beaches. Mature turtles spend most of their time in shallow, coastal waters with lush seagrass beds. Adults frequent inshore bays, lagoons, and shoals with lush seagrass meadows. Entire generations often migrate between one pair of feeding and nesting areas. Green sea turtles, Chelonia mydas, are classified as an aquatic species and are distributed around the globe in warm tropical to subtropical waters. The environmental parameter that limits the distribution of the turtles is ocean temperatures below 7 to 10 degrees Celsius. Within their geographical range, the green sea turtles generally stay near continental and island coastlines. Near the coastlines, the green sea turtles live within shallow bays and protected shores. In these protected shores and bays, the green sea turtle habitats include coral reefs, salt marshes, and nearshore seagrass beds. The coral reefs provide red, brown, and green algae for their diet and give protection from predators and rough storms within the ocean. The salt marshes and seagrass beds contain seaweed and grass vegetation, allowing ample habitat for the sea turtles.

Turtles spend most of their first five years in convergence zones within the bare open ocean that surround them. These young turtles are rarely seen as they swim in deep, pelagic waters. Green sea turtles typically swim at 2.5–3 km/h (1.6–1.9 mph).

== Ecology and behavior ==
In Guam

As one of the first sea turtle species studied, much of what is known of sea turtle ecology comes from studies of green turtles. The ecology of C. mydas changes drastically with each stage of its life history. Newly emerged hatchlings are carnivorous, pelagic organisms, part of the open ocean nekton. In contrast, immature juveniles and adults are commonly found in seagrass meadows closer inshore as herbivorous grazers.

=== Diet ===
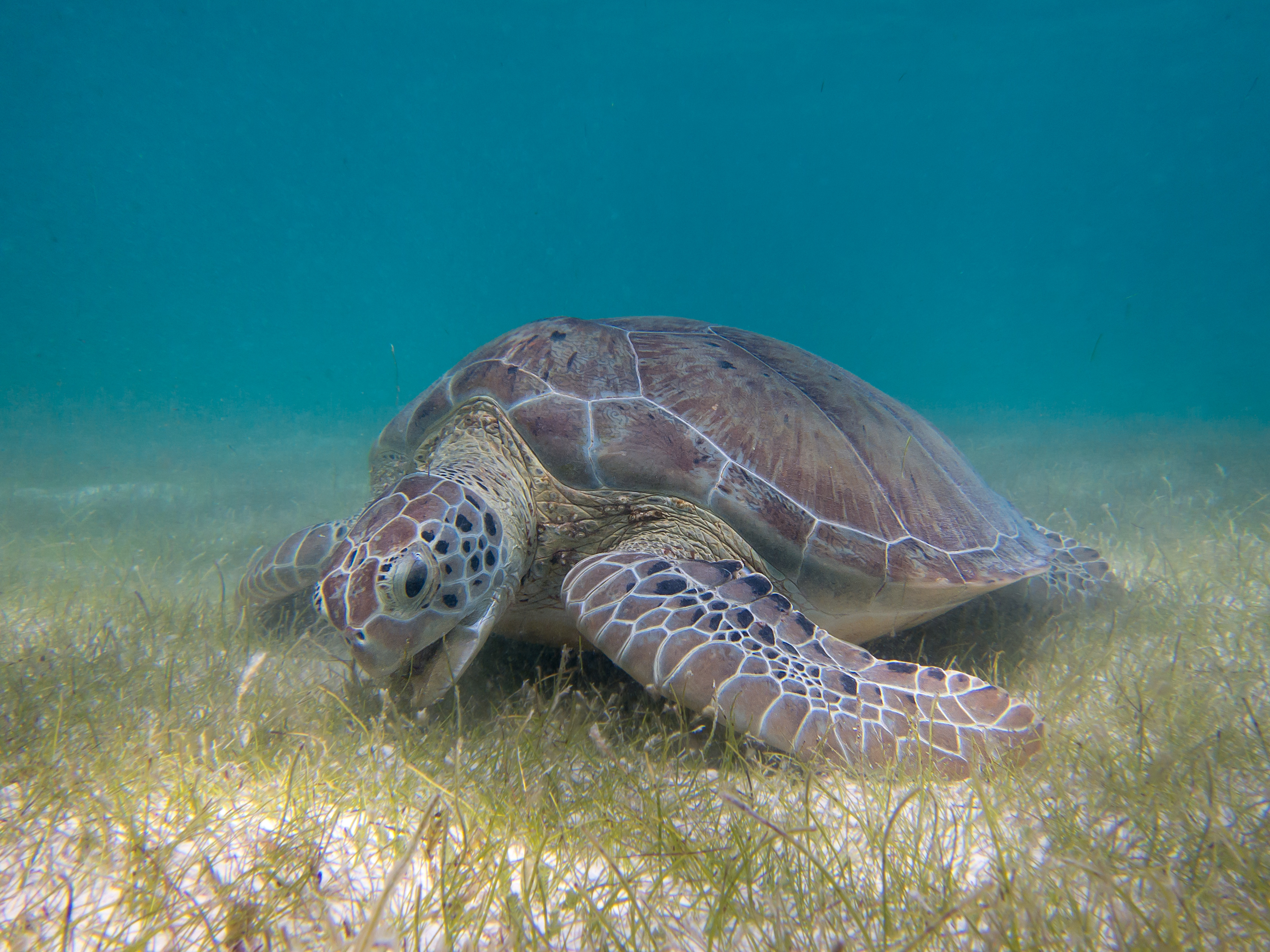
Green sea turtle grazing on seagrass

The diet of green turtles changes with age. Juveniles are carnivorous, but as they mature they become omnivorous. Young sea turtles eat fish and their eggs, sea hare eggs, hydrozoans, bryozoans, molluscs, jellyfish, small invertebrates, echinoderms, tunicates, insects, worms, sponges, algae, sea grasses, leaves, tree bark, and crustaceans. Green sea turtles have a relatively slow growth rate because of the low nutritional value of their diet. Body fat turns green because of the consumed vegetation. This diet shift has an effect on the green turtle's skull morphology. Their serrated jaw helps them chew green and red algae (such as filamentous red alga (Bostrychia), red moss (Caloglossa), freshwater red algae (Compsopogon), lobster horns (Polysiphonia), sea lettuce (Ulva lactuca), green seaweed (Gayralia), and crinkle grass (Rhizoclonium)) and sea grasses. They also consume large quantities of wetland plants such as Avicennia schaueriana and Sporobolus alterniflorus, which are commonly found in salt marshes. Most adult sea turtles are strictly herbivorous.

=== Predators and parasites ===
With barnacles, in the Gulf of Oman

Only some human beings and the larger sharks feed on C. mydas adults. Specifically, tiger sharks (Galeocerdo cuvier) hunt adults in Hawaiian waters. The tiger shark is the main predator of the green turtle as it will prey on green turtles of all sizes. The tiger shark has often been seen feeding on green turtles near their nesting beaches because they are restricted in the area of their nesting beaches and vulnerable to predation. Juveniles and new hatchlings have significantly more predators, including crabs, small marine mammals and shorebirds. Additionally, their eggs are vulnerable to predation by scavengers like red foxes and golden jackals.

Green sea turtles have a variety of parasites including barnacles, leeches, protozoans, cestodes, and nematodes. Barnacles attach to the carapace, and leeches to the flippers and skin of the turtles, causing damage to the soft tissues and leading to blood loss. Protozoans, cestodes and nematodes lead to many turtle deaths because of the infections in the liver and intestinal tract they cause. The greatest disease threat to the turtle population is fibropapilloma, which produces lethal tumor growth on scales, lungs, stomach, and kidneys. Fibropapilloma is caused by a herpesvirus that is transmitted by leeches such as Ozobranchus branchiatus, a species of leech which feeds almost entirely on green sea turtles.

=== Life cycle ===
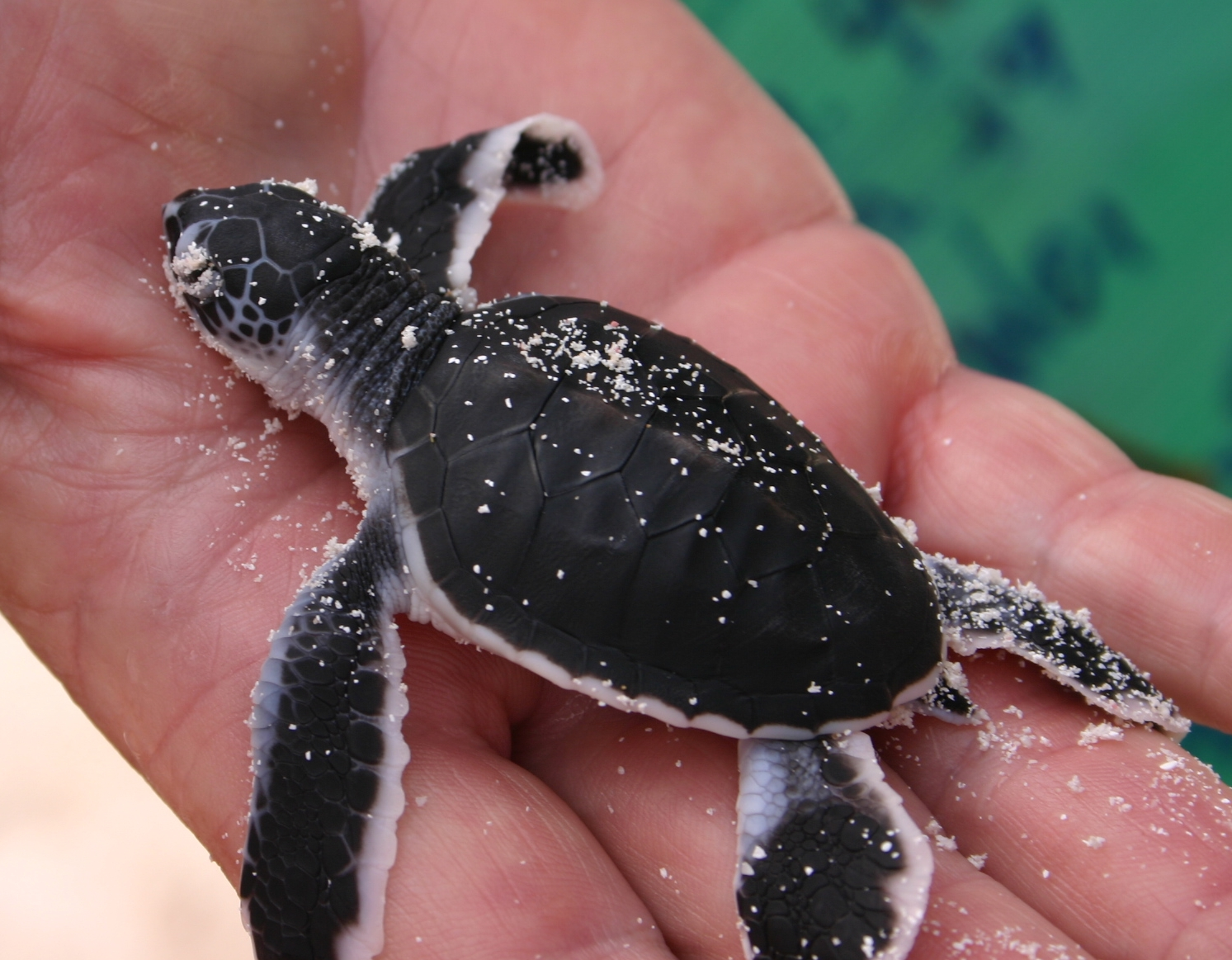
Hatchling

Hatchling, at Ascension Island

Green sea turtles migrate long distances between feeding sites and nesting sites; some swim more than 2,600 kilometres (1,600 mi) to reach their spawning grounds. Beaches in Southeast Asia, India, islands in the western Pacific, and Central America are where green sea turtles breed. Mature turtles often return to the exact beach from which they hatched. Females usually mate every two to four years. Males, on the other hand, visit the breeding areas every year, attempting to mate. Mating seasons vary between populations. For most C. mydas in the Caribbean, mating season is from June to September. The French Guiana nesting subpopulation nests from March to June. In the tropics, green turtles nest throughout the year, although some subpopulations prefer particular times of the year. In Pakistan, Indian Ocean turtles nest year-round, but prefer the months of July to December. Sea turtles return to the beaches on which they were born to lay their own eggs. The reason for returning to native beaches may be that it guarantees the turtles an environment that has the necessary components for their nesting to be successful. These include a sandy beach, easy access for the hatchlings to get to the ocean, the right incubation temperatures, and low probability of predators that may feed on their eggs. Over time these turtles have evolved these tendencies to return to an area that has provided reproductive success for many generations. Their ability to return to their birthplace is known as natal homing. The males also return to their birthplaces in order to mate. These males that return to their homes know they will be able to find mates because the females born there also return to breed. By doing this, the green sea turtles are able to improve their reproductive success and is why they are willing to expend the energy to travel thousands of miles across the ocean in order to reproduce.

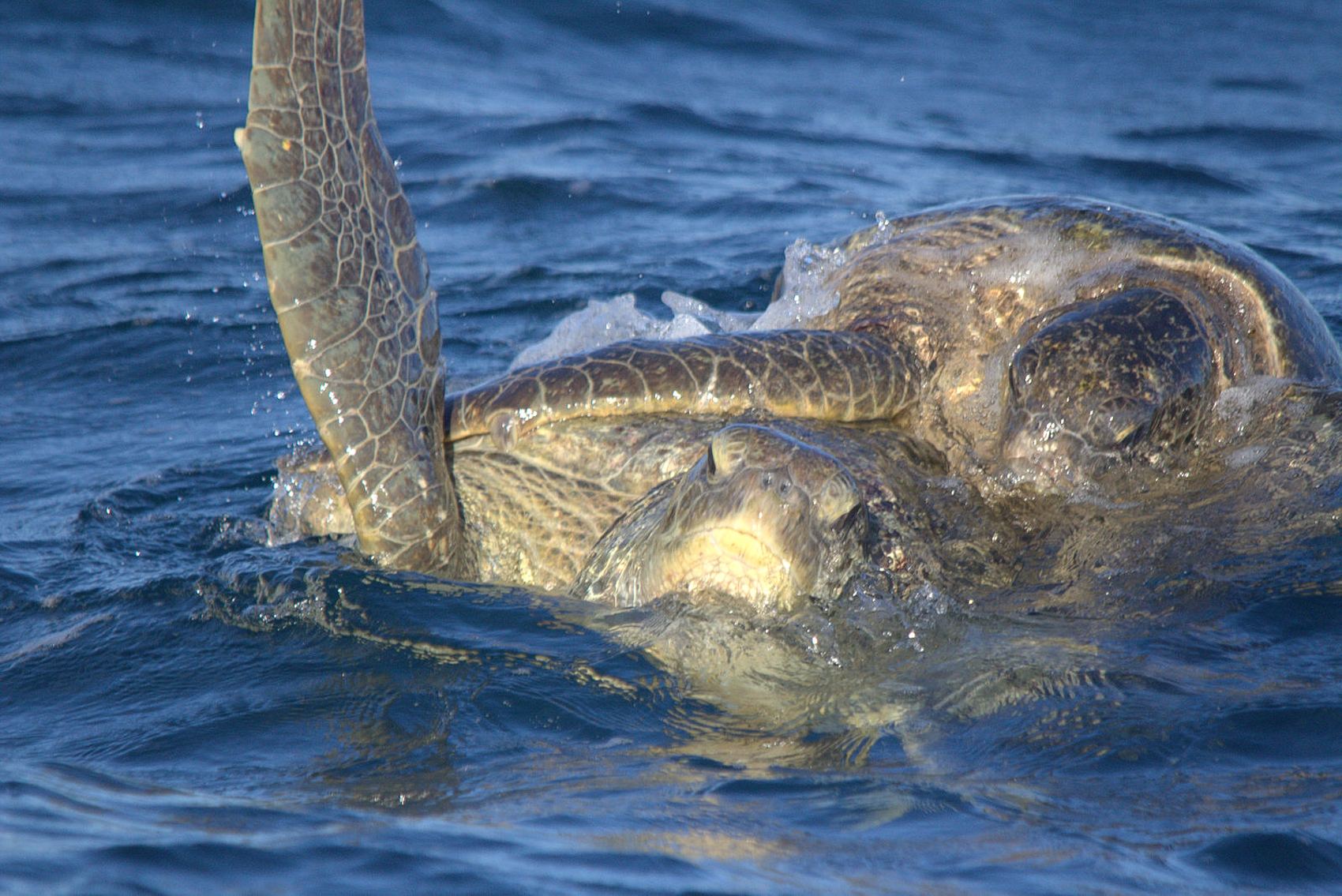
Mating, in Sri Lanka

Mating behaviour is similar to other marine turtles. Female turtles control the process. A few populations practice polyandry, although this does not seem to benefit hatchlings. After mating in the water, the female moves above the beach's high tide line, where she digs a hole 28–56 centimetres (11–22 in) in depth with her hind flippers and deposits her eggs. The hole is then covered up again. Clutch size ranges between 85 and 200, depending on the age of the female. This process takes about an hour to an hour and a half. After the nest is completely covered, she returns to the sea. The female will do this 3 to 5 times in one season.

Laying eggs, in Java

The eggs are round and white, and about 45 mm (1.8 in) in diameter. The hatchlings remain buried for days until they all emerge together at night. The temperature of the nest determines the sex of the turtles at around the 20–40 day mark. Green Sea Turtles are type 1a, meaning males develop at cooler temperatures while females are produced under hot temperatures. At around 50 to 70 days, the eggs hatch during the night, and the hatchlings instinctively head directly into the water. This is the most dangerous time in a turtle's life. As they walk, predators, such as gulls and crabs, feed on them. A significant percentage never make it to the ocean. Little is known of the initial life history of newly hatched sea turtles. Juveniles spend three to five years in the open ocean before they settle as still-immature juveniles into their permanent shallow-water lifestyle. It is speculated that they take twenty to fifty years to reach sexual maturity. Individuals live up to eighty years in the wild. It is estimated that only 1% of hatchlings reach sexual maturity. Each year on Ascension Island in the South Atlantic, C. mydas females create 6,000 to 25,000 nests. They are among the largest green turtles in the world; many are more than 1 metre (3 ft 3 in) in length and weigh up to 300 kilograms (660 lb).

=== Breathing and sleep ===
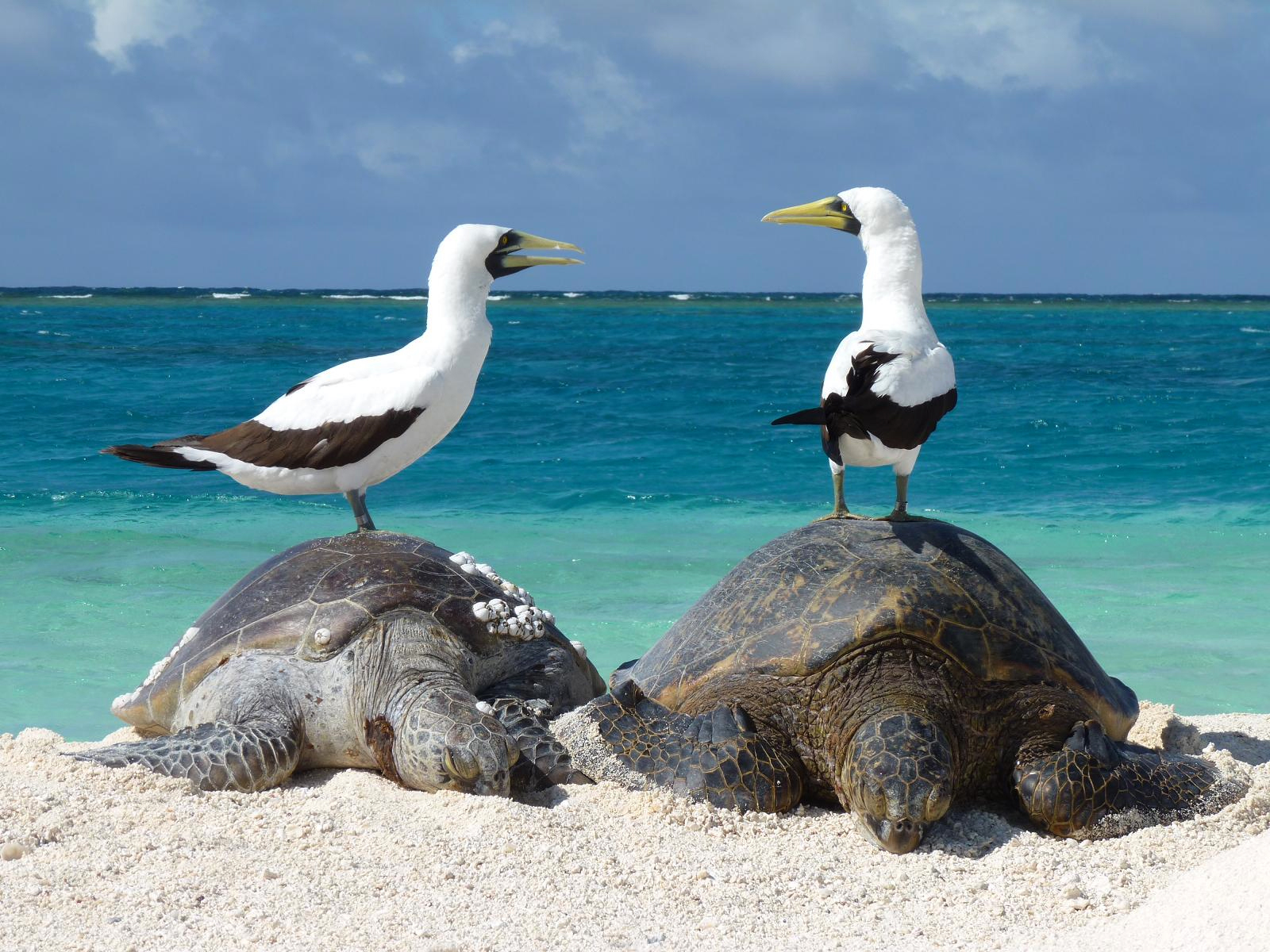
Sleeping green sea turtles, at the PMNM

Sea turtles spend almost all their lives submerged, but must breathe air for the oxygen needed to meet the demands of vigorous activity. With a single explosive exhalation and rapid inhalation, sea turtles can quickly replace the air in their lungs. The lungs permit a rapid exchange of oxygen and prevent gases from being trapped during deep dives. Sea turtle blood can deliver oxygen efficiently to body tissues even at the pressures encountered during diving. During routine activity, green and loggerhead turtles dive for about four to five minutes, and surface to breathe for one to three seconds.

Turtles can rest or sleep underwater for several hours at a time, but submergence time is much shorter while diving for food or to escape predators. Breath-holding ability is affected by activity and stress, which is why turtles quickly drown in shrimp trawlers and other fishing gear. During the night while sleeping and to protect themselves from potential predators, the adults wedge themselves under rocks below the surface and under ledges in reefs and coastal rocks. Many green sea turtles have been observed in returning to the same sleeping location night after night.

== Physiology and sensory modalities ==
Female (left) and male (right) basking, at Midway Atoll. Green sea turtles are the only sea turtle species that commonly bask on land. However, they are only known to do so in certain parts of their range. Basking occurs in both sexes.

Green sea turtles sometimes throw sand on to their backs while basking. This prevents overheating of the body surface while they heat up their core temperature

Green sea turtles tend to have good vision, well adapted to a life at sea. The turtles can see many colors, but are most sensitive to light from violet to yellow or wavelengths of 400 to 600 nanometers. They do not see many colors in the orange to red portion of the light spectrum. On land, however, the sea turtles are nearsighted because the lenses in the eyes are spherical and adjusted to refraction underwater. Sea turtles have no external ear and only one ear bone, called the columella. With one ear bone, the turtles can hear only low frequency sounds, from 200 to 700 Hz. Sounds can also be detected through vibrations of the head, backbone, and shell. The nose of the turtle has two external openings and connects to the roof of the mouth through internal openings. The lower surface of the nasal passage has two sets of sensory cells called the Jacobson's organ. The turtle can use this organ to smell by pumping water in and out of its nose.

Since green sea turtles migrate long distances during breeding seasons, they have special adaptive systems in order to navigate. In the open ocean, the turtles navigate using wave directions, sun light, and temperatures. The sea turtles also contain an internal magnetic compass. They can detect magnetic information by using magnetic forces acting on the magnetic crystals in their brains. Through these crystals, they can sense the intensity of Earth's magnetic field and are able to make their way back to their nesting grounds or preferred feeding grounds.

Natal homing is an animal's ability to return to its birthplace in order to reproduce. Natal homing is found in all species of sea turtles and in other animals such as salmon. How these turtles are able to return to their birthplace is an interesting phenomenon. Many researchers believe that sea turtles use a process called imprinting, which is a special type of learning that occurs when turtles first hatch that allows them to recognize their native beach. There are two types of imprinting that are thought to be the reason turtles can find these beaches. The first is the chemical imprinting hypothesis. This hypothesis states that much like salmon, sea turtles are able to use olfactory cues and senses to smell their way home. However, a problem with this hypothesis is that some turtles travel thousands of miles to return to their native beaches, and the scents from that area are not likely to travel and be distinguishable from that distance. The second hypothesis is the geomagnetic. This hypothesis states that as it hatches, a young turtle will imprint on the magnetic field of the beach they are born on. This hypothesis strongly correlates to the method which sea turtles use to navigate the earth.

In order to tolerate the constant heat loss in the water, sea turtles have the ability to shunt blood away from tissues that are tolerant of low oxygen levels toward the heart, brain, and central nervous system. Other mechanisms include basking on warm beaches and producing heat through their activity and movements of their muscles. Basking turtles sometimes look like they are crying because behind the turtles eye is the lachrymal gland which stores excess salt from the sea water, which then expels through the turtles eye. In the winter months, turtles living at higher latitudes can hibernate for a short period in the mud.

== Unique characteristics and features ==
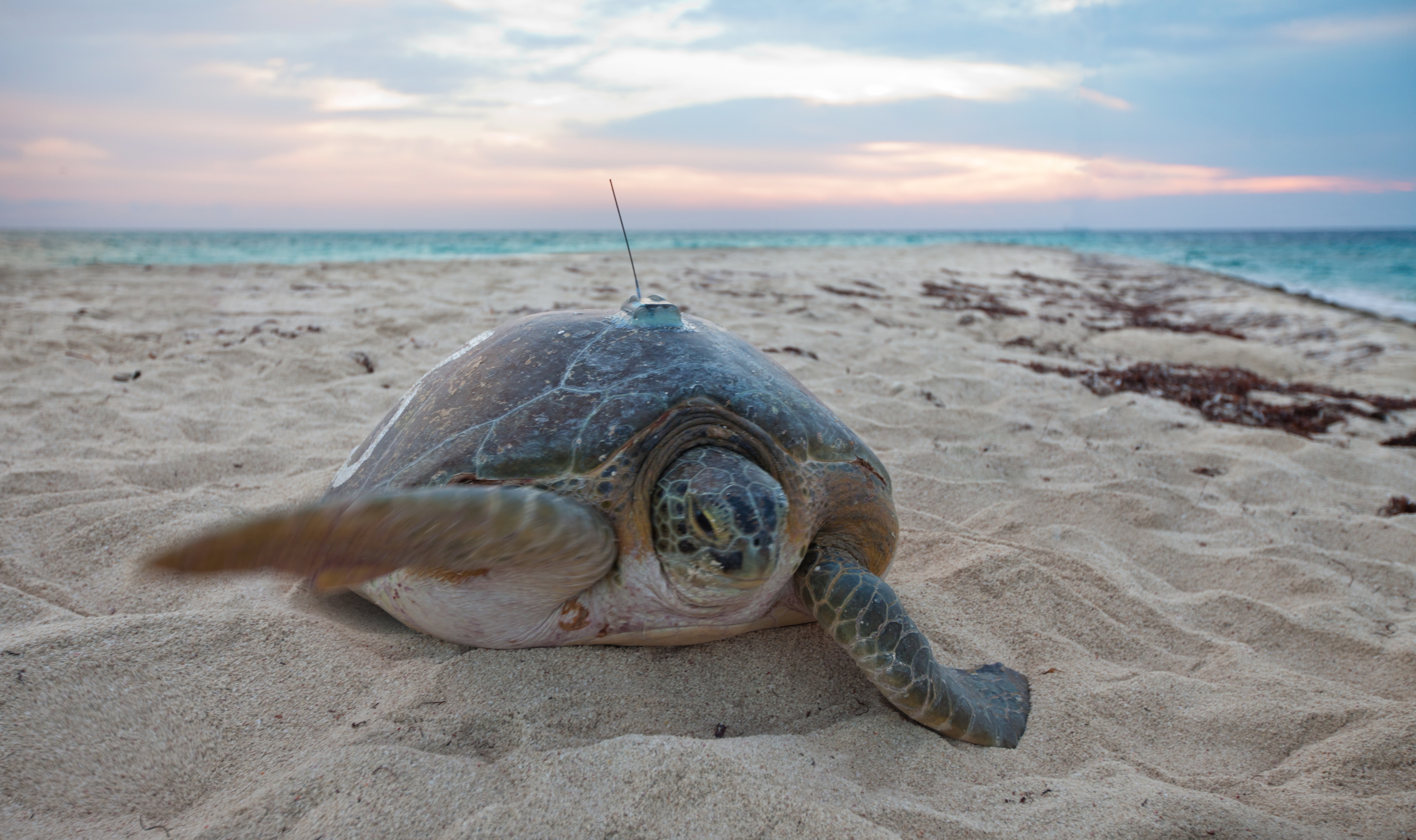
A tracked nesting sea turtle

Leucistic juvenile

Green sea turtles can reach up to 40 miles per hour when swimming, making them the fastest sea turtle. The green sea turtles exhibit sex differences by their development and appearance. As adult turtles, males are easily distinguishable from the females by having a longer tail (visibly extending past the shell) and longer claws on the front flippers. The hatching time and sex of the turtles are determined by the incubation temperature of the nest. Hatchings occur more quickly in nests that are warmer than nests that are in cooler conditions. Warm nesting sites above 30 degrees Celsius favor the development of females, whereas nesting sites below 30 degrees Celsius produce males. The position of the egg in the nest also affects sex-determination. Eggs in the center tend to hatch as females due to the warmer conditions within the nest.

Green sea turtles play an essential role in the ecosystem in which they live. In the seagrass beds, the turtles feed on the seagrass by trimming only the top and leaving the roots of the plant. Through their feeding technique, the turtles help to improve the health and growth of the seagrass beds. The healthy seagrass beds that the turtles provide give habitat and feeding grounds for many species of fish and crustaceans. On the nesting beaches, the green sea turtles provide key nutrients for the ecosystem through their hatched egg shells. In their coral reef habitat, the green sea turtles have a symbiotic interaction with reef fish, including the yellow tang. The yellow tang fish swims along with the turtle and feeds on the algae, barnacles, and parasites on its shell and flippers. This species interaction provides food for the yellow tang and provides a necessary cleaning and smoothing of the turtle's shell. This cleaning helps the turtles swim by reducing the amount of drag and improves their health.

== Importance to humans ==
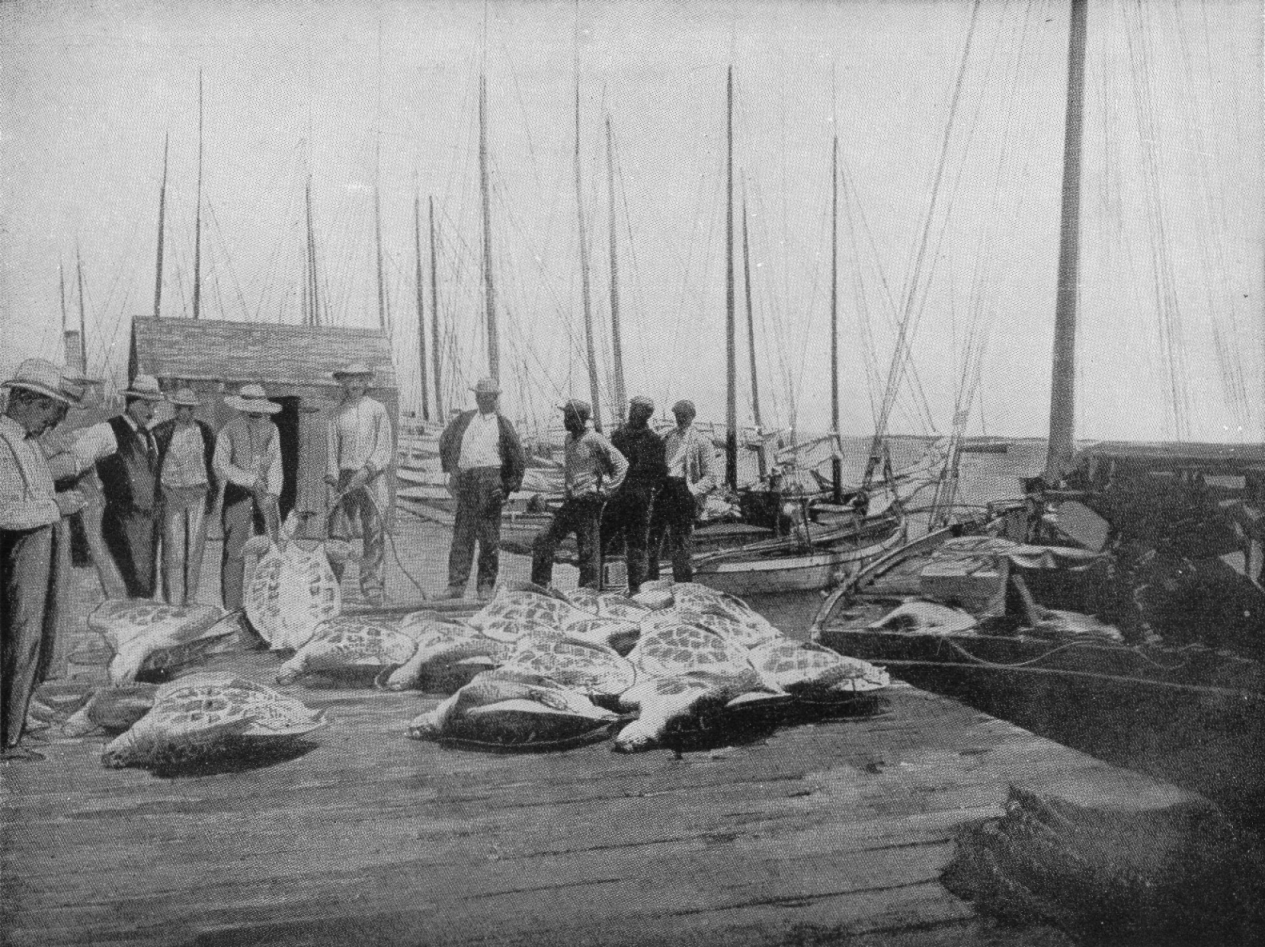
Harvested green turtles on a wharf at Key West, Florida

Historically, the turtles' skin was tanned and used to make handbags, especially in Hawaii. Ancient Chinese considered the flesh of sea turtles a culinary delicacy, including and especially C. mydas. Particularly for this species, the turtle's fat, cartilage, and flesh, known as calipee, are sought as ingredients for making turtle soup, a popular 19th-century English and American dish.

In Java, Indonesia, sea turtle eggs were a popular delicacy. However, the turtle's flesh is regarded as ḥarām or "unclean" under Islamic law (Islam is Java's primary religion). In Bali, turtle meat was a prominent feature at ceremonial and religious feasts. Turtles were harvested in the remotest parts of the Indonesian archipelago. Bali has been importing sea turtles since the 1950s, as its own turtle supplies became depleted. The mostly Hindu Balinese do not eat the eggs, but sell them instead to local Muslims.

Being prepared by cooks

Commercial farms, such as the Cayman Turtle Farm in the West Indies, once bred them for commercial sale of turtle meat, turtle oil (rendered from the fat), turtle shell, and turtle leather made from the skin. The farm's initial stock was in large part from "doomed" eggs removed from nests threatened by erosion, flooding, or in chemically hostile soil. The farms held as many as 100,000 turtles at any one time. When the international markets were closed by regulations that did not allow even farm-bred turtle products to be exported internationally, the surviving farm became primarily a tourist attraction, supporting 11,000 turtles. Initially started as Mariculture Ltd., then Cayman Turtle Farm Ltd and subsequently branded Boatswain's Beach, in 2010 the farm's brandname was changed to Cayman Turtle Farm: Island Wildlife Encounter.

Sea turtles are integral to the history and culture of the Cayman Islands. When the islands were first discovered by Christopher Columbus in 1503, he named them "Las Tortugas" because of the abundance of sea turtles in the waters around the islands. Many of the earliest visitors came to the Cayman Islands to capture the turtles as a source of fresh meat during long voyages. The green turtle is a national symbol displayed as part of the coat of arms of the Cayman Islands, which also forms part of the national flag of the Cayman Islands. The country's currency uses a turtle as the watermark in its banknotes. A stylised sea turtle nicknamed "Sir Turtle" is the mascot of the national airline Cayman Airways and is part of the livery of its aircraft.

A ki'i pōhaku (petroglyph) of a green sea turtle (or honu) can be found on the Big Island of Hawaii in the Pu'u Loa lava fields. The green sea turtle has always held a special meaning for Hawaiians and this petroglyph shows its importance; it may date to when the Hawaiian Islands first became populated. The turtle symbolizes a navigator that can find his way home time after time. This symbol mirrors the real life of the green Hawaiian turtle as it will swim hundreds of miles to lay its eggs at its own place of birth. Though there are other myths as well, some Hawaiian legends say the honu were the first to guide the Polynesians to the Hawaiian Islands. Hawaiians revere the turtle and the legend of Kailua, a turtle who could take the form of a girl at will. In human form, she looked after the children playing on Punaluʻu Beach.

== Conservation ==
Sea turtles have moved from unrestricted exploitation to global protection, with some individual countries providing additional protection, although serious threats remain. In 2025, the International Union for Conservation of Nature (IUCN) reclassified the global population of green sea turtles from endangered to least concern, though some sub-populations remain a conservation concern.

=== Threats ===
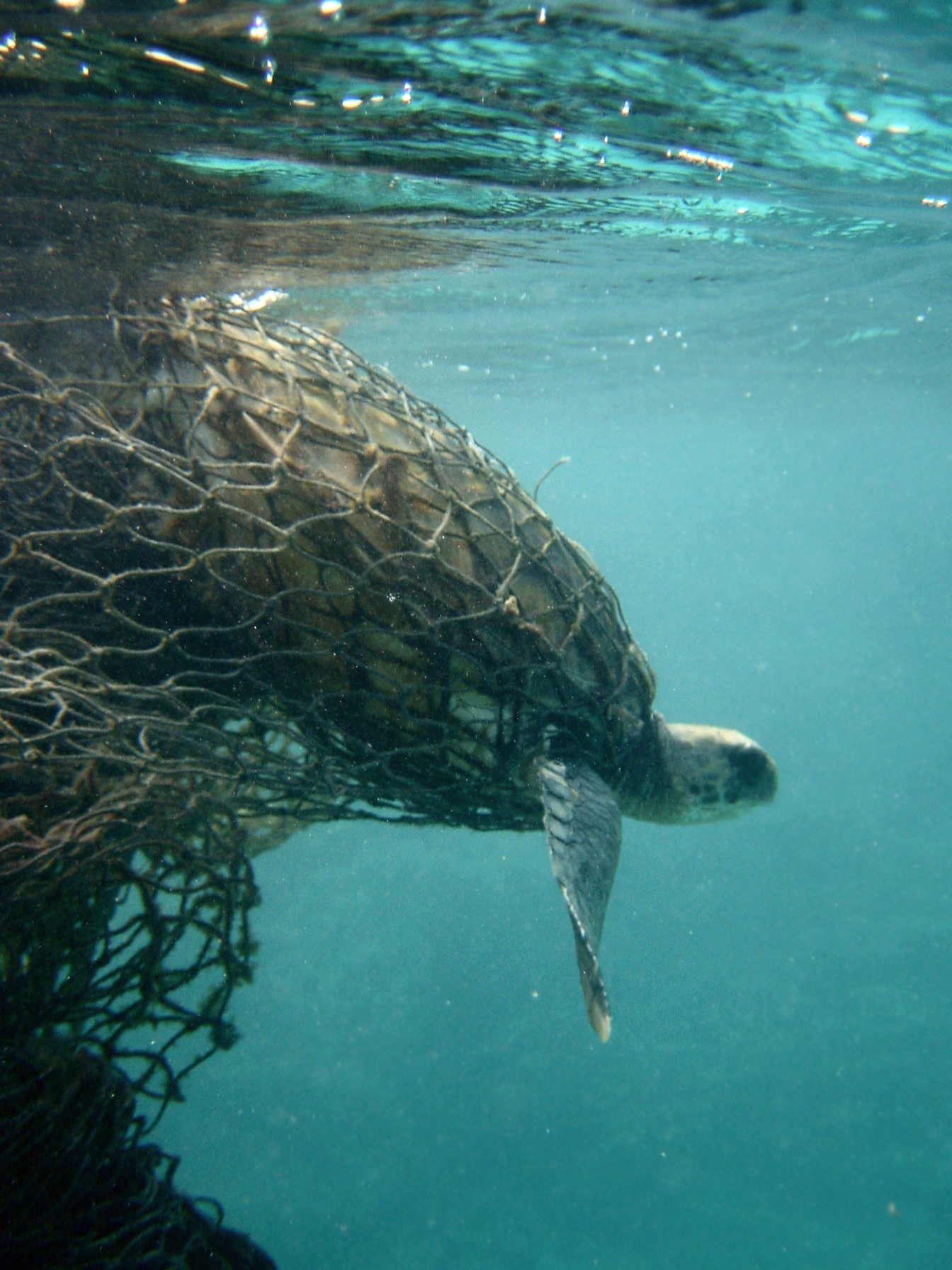
Entangled in a ghost net

Human action presents both intentional and unintentional threats to the species' survival. Intentional threats include continued hunting, poaching and egg harvesting. More dangerous are unintentional threats, including boat strikes, fishermen's nets that lack turtle excluder devices, pollution and habitat destruction. Chemical pollution may create tumors; effluent from harbors near nesting sites may create disturbances; and light pollution may disorient hatchlings. With chemical pollution present, there is a development of tar balls that is often eaten by green sea turtles in a confusion of their food. Tar balls cause the green sea turtle to ingest toxins that can block their guts and cause swelling of the tissue, displacing the liver and intestines. Habitat loss usually occurs due to human development of nesting areas. Beach-front construction, land "reclamation" and increased tourism are examples of such development. An infectious tumor-causing disease, fibropapillomatosis, is also a problem in some populations. The disease kills a sizeable fraction of those it infects, though some individuals seem to resist the disease. In addition, at least in the Southwestern Atlantic (Río de la Plata, Uruguay), exotic invasive species such as the rapa whelk Rapana venosa, were reported massively bio-fouling immature green turtles, reducing buoyancy, increasing drag, and causing severe injuries to the carapace. Because of these threats, many populations are in a vulnerable state.

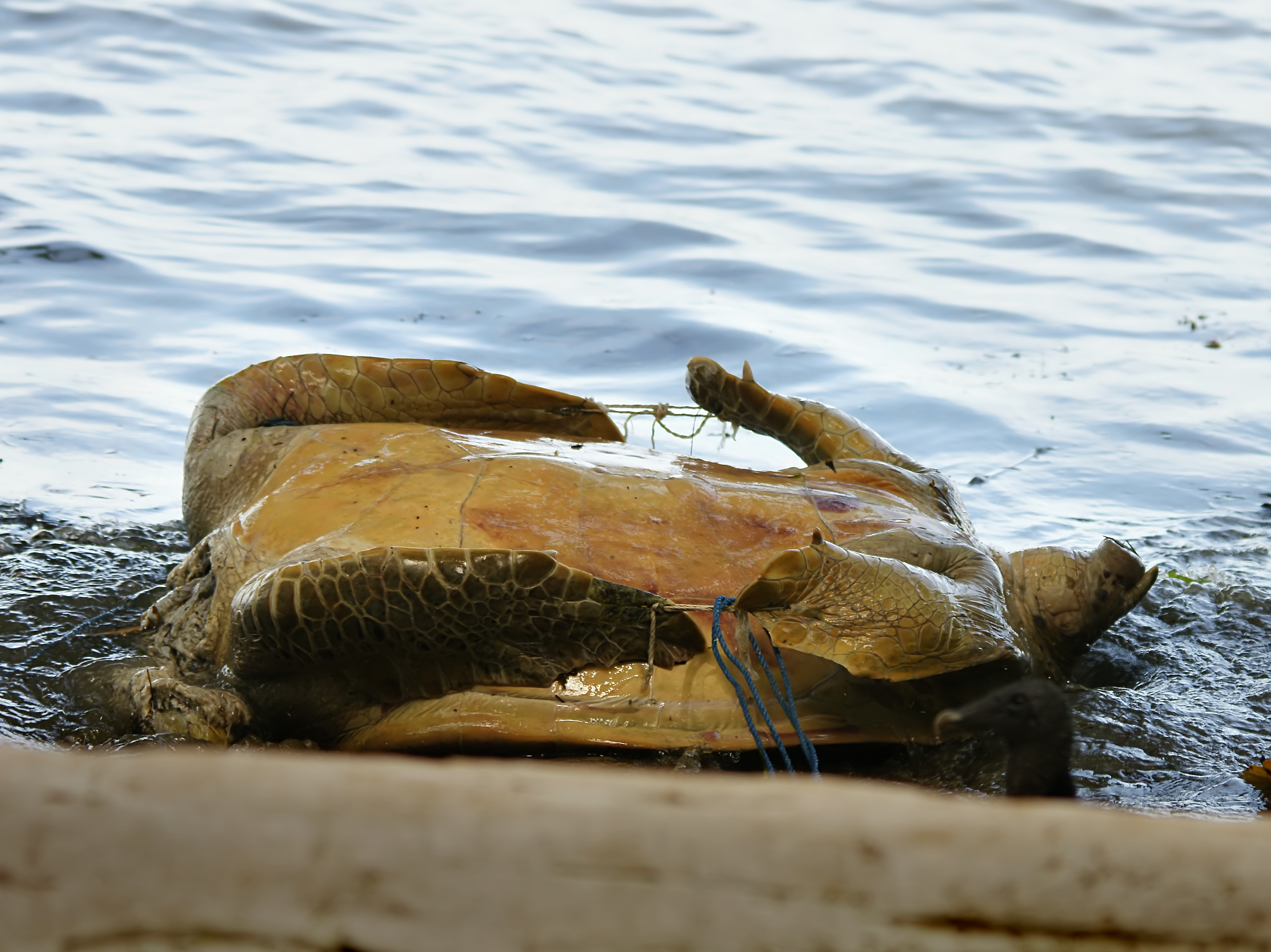
A poached green turtle in Costa Rica

Pacific green turtles' foraging habitats are poorly understood and mostly unknown. These foraging grounds are most likely along the coast of Baja California, Mexico and southern California, in which these turtles have a high risk of incidental capture by coastal fisheries. The main mortality factor for these turtles is the shrimp trawlers in Mexico, in which many of these turtles go undocumented. The only foraging area that has been identified is San Diego Bay, but it is heavily polluted with metals and PCBs. These contaminants have a negative effect on the ocean environment, and have been shown to cause lesions and sometimes mortality. Green turtles also are threatened by entanglement and ingestion of plastic. In San Diego Bay, an adult green turtle was found dead with monofilament netting tightly packed in its esophagus. In addition there are indications that global climate change is affecting the ability of green turtle populations in Australia to produce males due to their temperature-dependent sex determination and the rising temperatures in the northern Great Barrier Reef region. Construction of new thermal power stations can raise local water temperature, which is also said to be a threat.

Green sea turtles are the most commonly traded species along Java's south coast and are sold in the form of whole, stuffed animals or turtle oil, locally known as "minyak bulus".

The geographer James J. Parsons' book titled The Green Turtle and Man played a special role in the conservation movement to save the species from extinction.

=== Global initiatives ===
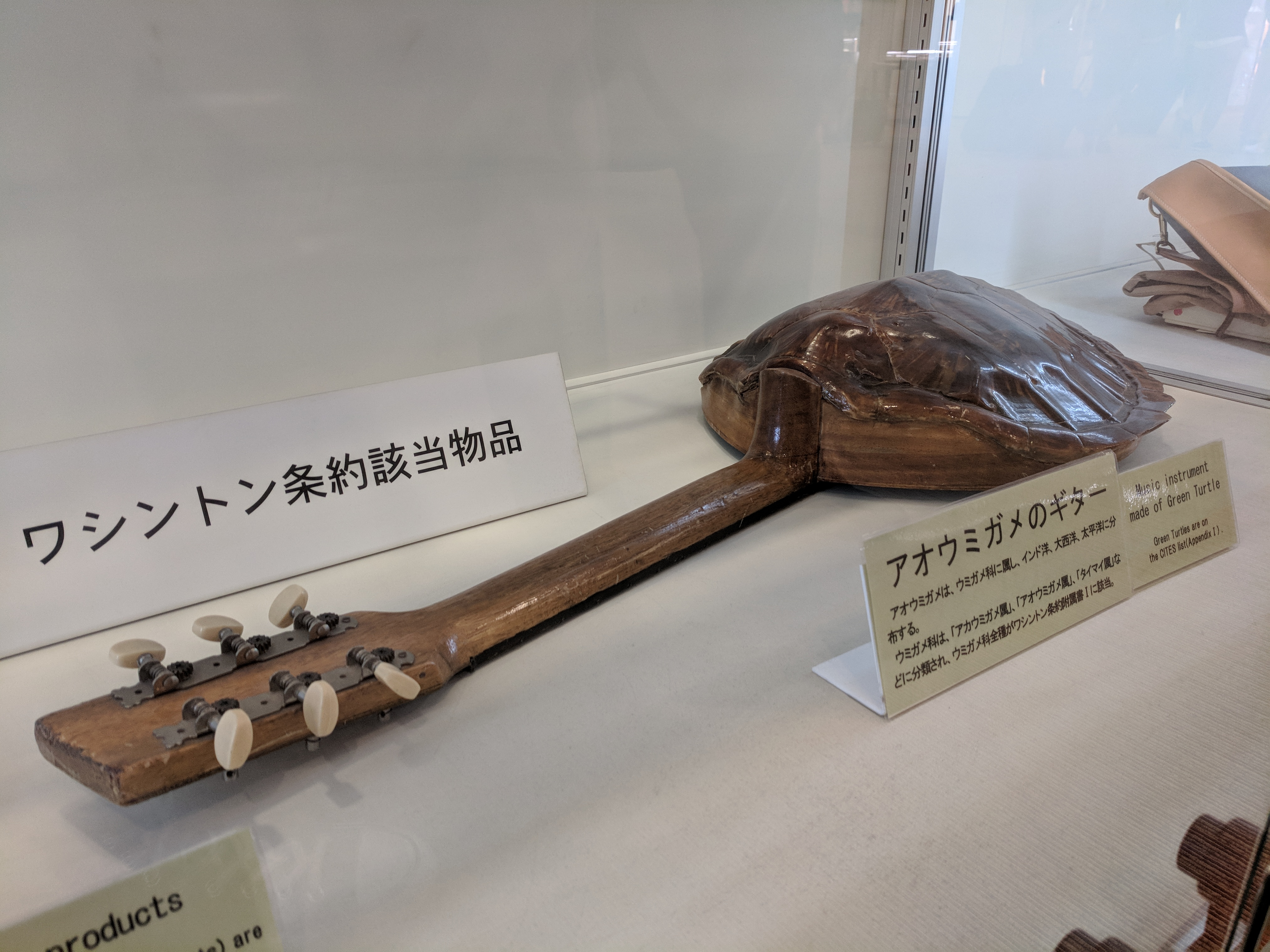
A confiscated musical instrument made from the shell of a green turtle, on display at Narita International Airport, Tokyo.

The International Union for Conservation of Nature (IUCN) has repeatedly listed green sea turtles in its Red List under differing criteria. In 1982, they officially classified it as an endangered species. The 1986, 1988, 1990, 1994, and the landmark 1996 edition of the IUCN Red List, retained the listing.

In 2001, Nicholas Mrosovsky filed a delisting petition, claiming some green turtle populations were large, stable and in some cases, increasing. At the time, the species was listed under the strict EN A1abd criteria. The IUCN Standards and Petitions Subcommittee ruled that visual counts of nesting females could not be considered "direct observation" and thus downgraded the species' status to EN A1bd—retaining the turtle's endangered status.

In 2004, the IUCN reclassified C. mydas as endangered under the EN A2bd criteria, which essentially states the wild populations face a high risk of extinction because of several factors. These factors include a probable population reduction of more than 50% over the past decade as estimated from abundance indices and by projecting exploitation levels.

On 3 May 2007, C. mydas was listed on Appendix I of the Convention on International Trade in Endangered Species (CITES) as a member of the family Cheloniidae. The species was originally listed on Appendix II in 1975. The entire family was moved to Appendix I in 1977, with the exception of the Australian population of C. mydas. In 1981, the Australian population joined the rest. The Appendix I listing prohibits commercial international trade in the species (including parts and derivatives). The Zoological Society of London has listed the reptile as an EDGE species.

In October 2025, the IUCN amended green turtle conservation status to "least concern", though some subpopulations remain at risk. The Mediterranean population is listed as critically endangered. The eastern Pacific, Hawaiian and Southern California subpopulations are designated threatened. Specific Mexican subpopulations are listed as endangered. The Florida population is listed as endangered. The World Wide Fund for Nature has labeled populations in Pakistan as "rare and declining".

Since 1999, the Florida Aquarium has led extensive sea turtle rehabilitation efforts and visitor and community education & conservation platforms to advance sea turtle protection. Over a 20-year period, the aquarium received 200 sea turtles, and while not all could be released due to the nature of their injuries or illnesses, 180 were successfully released. In 2019, they opened a state-of-the-art Sea Turtle Rehabilitation Center in Apollo Beach, Florida. In the first year, The Florida Aquarium Animal Response Team managed the care of 21 sea turtles, initiated new foraging-readiness testing for release candidates in deep-dive tank, and released 14 animals. In 2020, they also initiated a study to better understand how micro-plastics are impacting the sea turtles in their care. In 2016, Florida enacted extensive protection measures. Florida statutes (F.A.C. Rule 68E-1) restrict the take, possession, disturbance, mutilation, destruction, selling, transference, molestation, and harassment of marine turtles, nests or eggs. Protection is also afforded to marine turtle habitat. A specific authorization from commission staff is required to conduct scientific, conservation, or educational activities that directly involve marine turtles in or collected from Florida, their nests, hatchlings or parts thereof, regardless of applicant's possession of any federal permit.

In the State of Hawaii, specifically on the Island of Hawaiʻi (Hawaii County), state representative Faye Hanohano, a Native Hawaiian rights activist, pressed for a measure to delist C. mydas from protected status so that Native Hawaiians could legally harvest the turtles and possibly their eggs as well. The bill, HCR14, was largely overlooked by the media since at that point it was only a local issue. While the bill was passed in the United States House of Representatives, the United States Senate's Committee on Energy and Environment refused to hear it, which meant that the bill did not go on to be heard by the Senate.

=== Country-specific initiatives ===
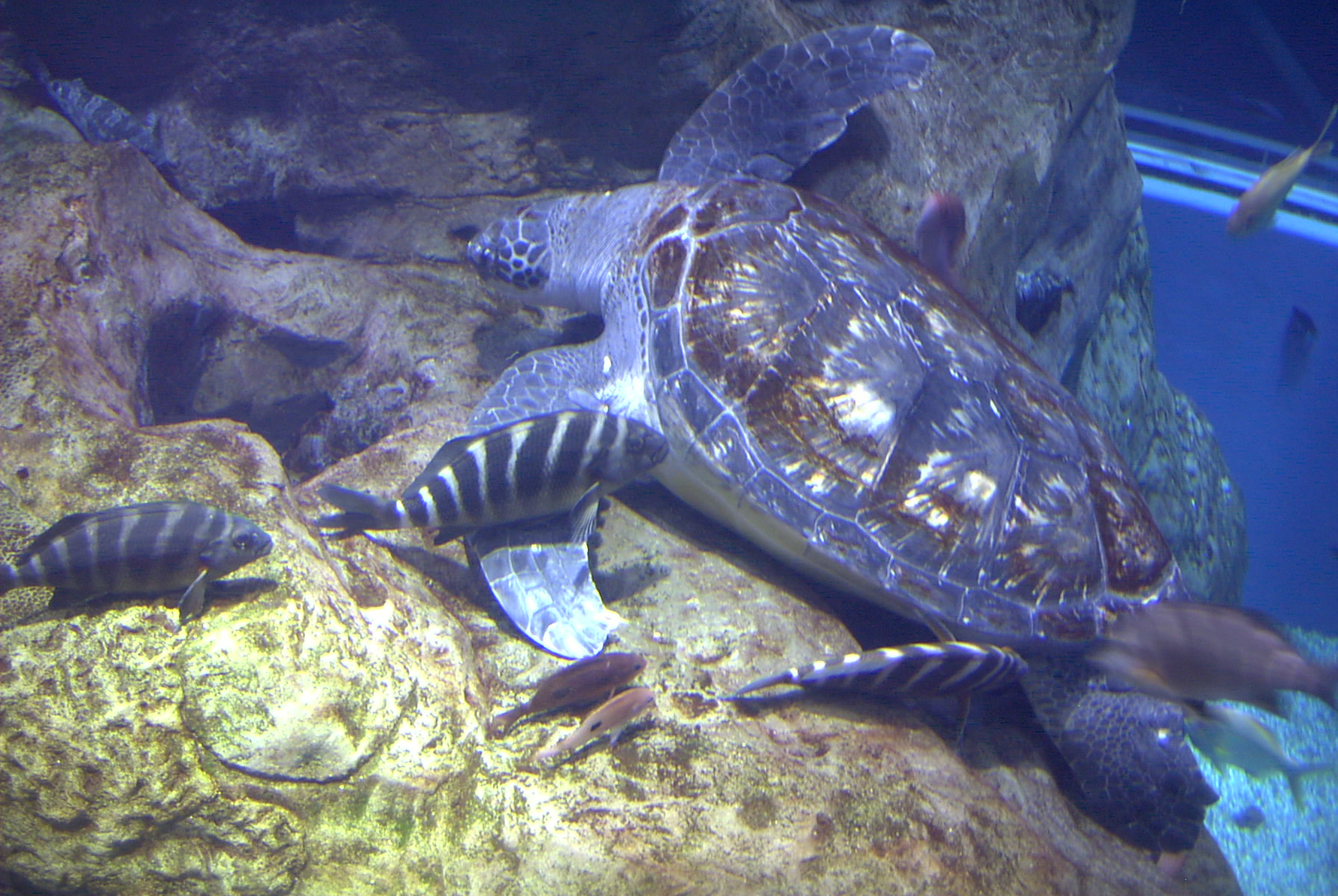
At the Osaka Aquarium, profile photo of turtle resting on bottom

In addition to management by global entities such as the IUCN and CITES, specific countries around the world have undertaken conservation efforts.

The Indonesian island of Bali has traditional uses that were considered sustainable, but have been questioned considering greater demand from the larger and wealthier human population. The harvest was the most intensive in the world. In 1999, Indonesia restricted turtle trade and consumption because of the decreasing population and threat of a tourist boycott. It rejected a request made by Bali Governor I Made Mangku Pastika in November 2009 to set a quota of 1,000 turtles to be killed in Hindu religious ceremonies. While conservationists respect the need for turtles in rituals, they wanted a smaller quota.

Multiple protected areas of the Philippines have significant green sea turtle nesting and feeding sites. The most notable is Turtle Islands Wildlife Sanctuary, an UNESCO tentative site which encompasses an entire municipality and one of Southeast Asia's most important green sea turtle nesting sites. Other notable sites include the UNESCO tentative site of El Nido-Taytay Management Resource Protected Area and the UNESCO World Heritage Site of Tubbataha Reefs Natural Park. The species is protected under Republic Act 9147 or the Wildlife Resources Conservation and Protection Act, while the sites where they live and nest are protected under the National Integrated Protected Areas System Act.

Ecotourism is one initiative in Sabah, Malaysia. The island of Pulau Selingan is home to a turtle hatchery. Staff people place some of the eggs laid each night in a hatchery to protect them from predators. Incubation takes around sixty days. When the eggs hatch, tourists assist in the release of the baby turtles into the sea.

The Hawaiian subpopulation has made a remarkable comeback and is now one focus of ecotourism and has become something of a state mascot. Students of Hawaii Preparatory Academy on the Big Island have tagged thousands of specimens since the early 1990s.

In the United Kingdom the species is protected by a Biodiversity Action Plan, due to excess harvesting and marine pollution. The Pakistani-branch of the World Wide Fund for Nature has been initiating projects for secure turtle hatching since the 1980s. However, the population has continued to decline.

In the Atlantic, conservation initiatives have centered around Caribbean nesting sites. The Tortuguero nesting beaches in Costa Rica have been the subject of egg-collection limits since the 1950s. The Tortuguero National Park was formally established in 1976, in part, to protect that region's nesting grounds. On Ascension Island, which contains some of the most important nesting beaches, an active conservation program has been implemented. Karumbé has been monitoring foraging and developmental areas of juvenile green turtles in Uruguay since 1999.

In Mozambique, there are a number of initiatives to protect sea turtles. In the Primeiras e Segundas, WWF Mozambique has established a turtle tagging and protection program. The archipelago is a vital nesting area for green turtles, including Ilha do Fogo where Earth Legacy Foundation manage a turtle monitoring programme, and at Celdeira Island, where several nesting females have been tagged.

Cayman Turtle Farm located in Grand Cayman in the northwest Caribbean Sea is the first farm to have achieved the second generation of green sea turtles bred, laid, hatched, and raised in captivity. Since its beginning in 1968, the farm has released over 31,000 turtles into the wild, and each year more captive-bred turtles are released into the Caribbean Sea from beaches around the island of Grand Cayman. Captive-bred turtles released from the farm as hatchlings or yearlings with "living tags," have now begun to return to nest on Grand Cayman as adults. On February 19, 2012 the farm released the first 2nd-generation captive-bred green sea turtle equipped with a Position Tracking Transponder, or PTT (also known as a satellite tag). In addition, the farm provides turtle meat products to the local population for whom turtle has been part of the traditional cuisine for centuries. In so doing, the farm curtails the incentive to take turtles from the wild, which over the years in addition to the Cayman Turtle Farm's release of captive-bred turtles has enabled an increase in the number of turtles sighted in the waters around the island of Grand Cayman and nesting on its beaches.

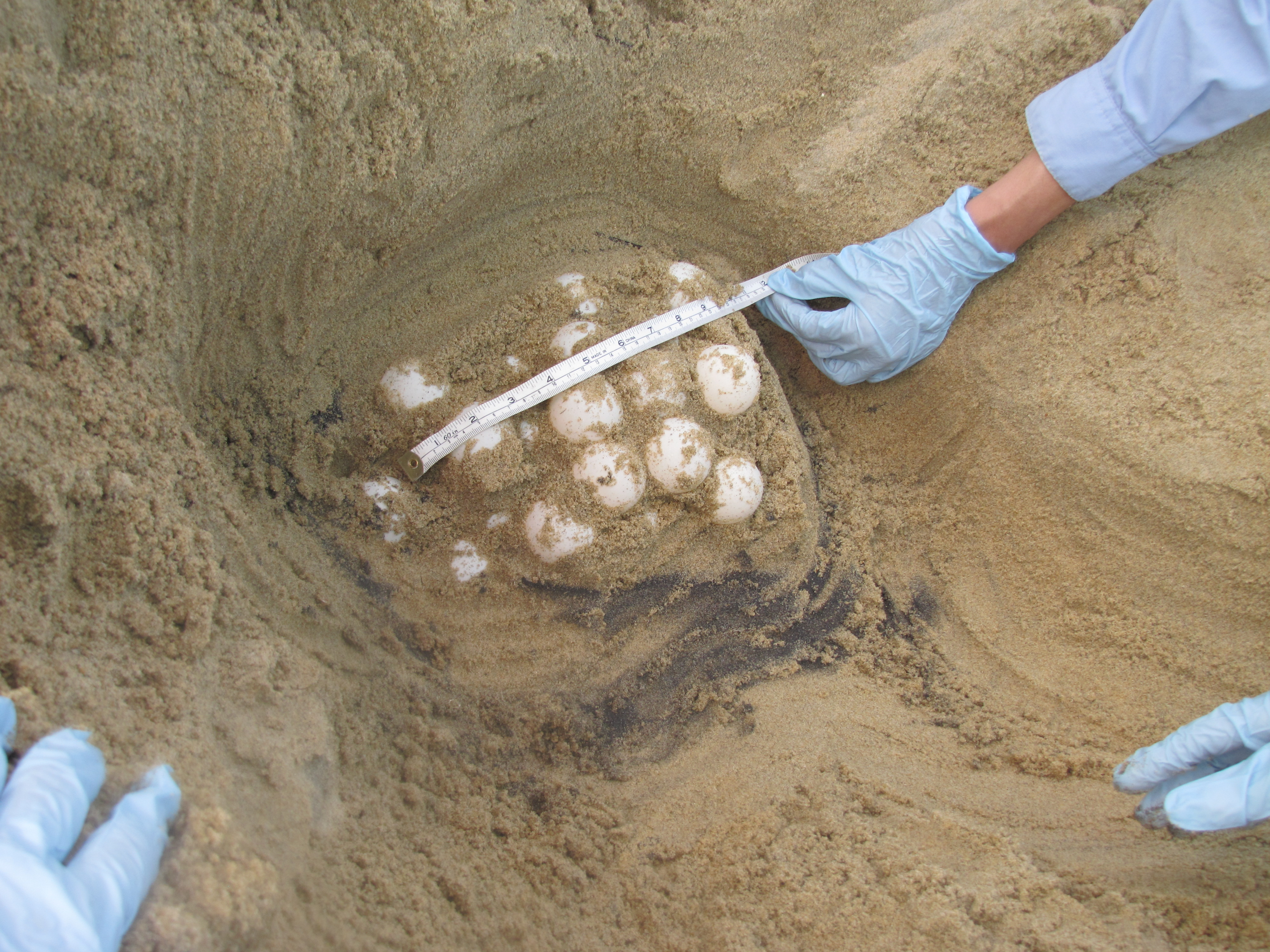
United States Fish and Wildlife Service measures sea turtle eggs

In the Pacific, green sea turtles nest on the motu (islets) in the Funafuti Conservation Area, a marine conservation area covering 33 square kilometers (12.74 square miles) of reef, lagoon and motu on the western side of Funafuti atoll in Tuvalu.

On Raine Island, up to 100,000 nesting females have been observed in a season, with the cay producing 90% of the region's green turtles. However, the hatching rate declined in the 1990s, and a further decline in the population was threatened by the deaths of thousands of females as they struggled to climb the small sandy cliffs. In addition, as the shape of the island had changed over time, the spread of the beaches outwards had led to greater risk of inundation of the turtle nests. Between 2011 and 2020, a collaborative project by the Queensland Government, BHP (as corporate sponsor), the Great Barrier Reef Marine Park Authority, Great Barrier Reef Foundation, and Wuthathi and Meriam traditional owners, reshaped the island using heavy machinery in a way that gave the female turtles a smoother passage and reduced the risk of nest inundation. A sophisticated monitoring and research system, using 3D modelling, satellite technology and drones was employed, and monitoring continues.

As of June 2020, a project called "The Turtle Cooling Project" is being undertaken by scientists from the World Wildlife Fund Australia, University of Queensland, Deakin University and the Queensland Government. It is looking at the effect of global warming on northern green turtle breeding, in particular the effect of producing more female turtles owing to the higher temperatures. They are working in the area around Raine Island, Heron Island and Moulter Cay.

== Genetics ==
The genome of Chelonia mydas was sequenced in 2013 to examine the development and evolution of the turtle body plan.

== Gallery ==
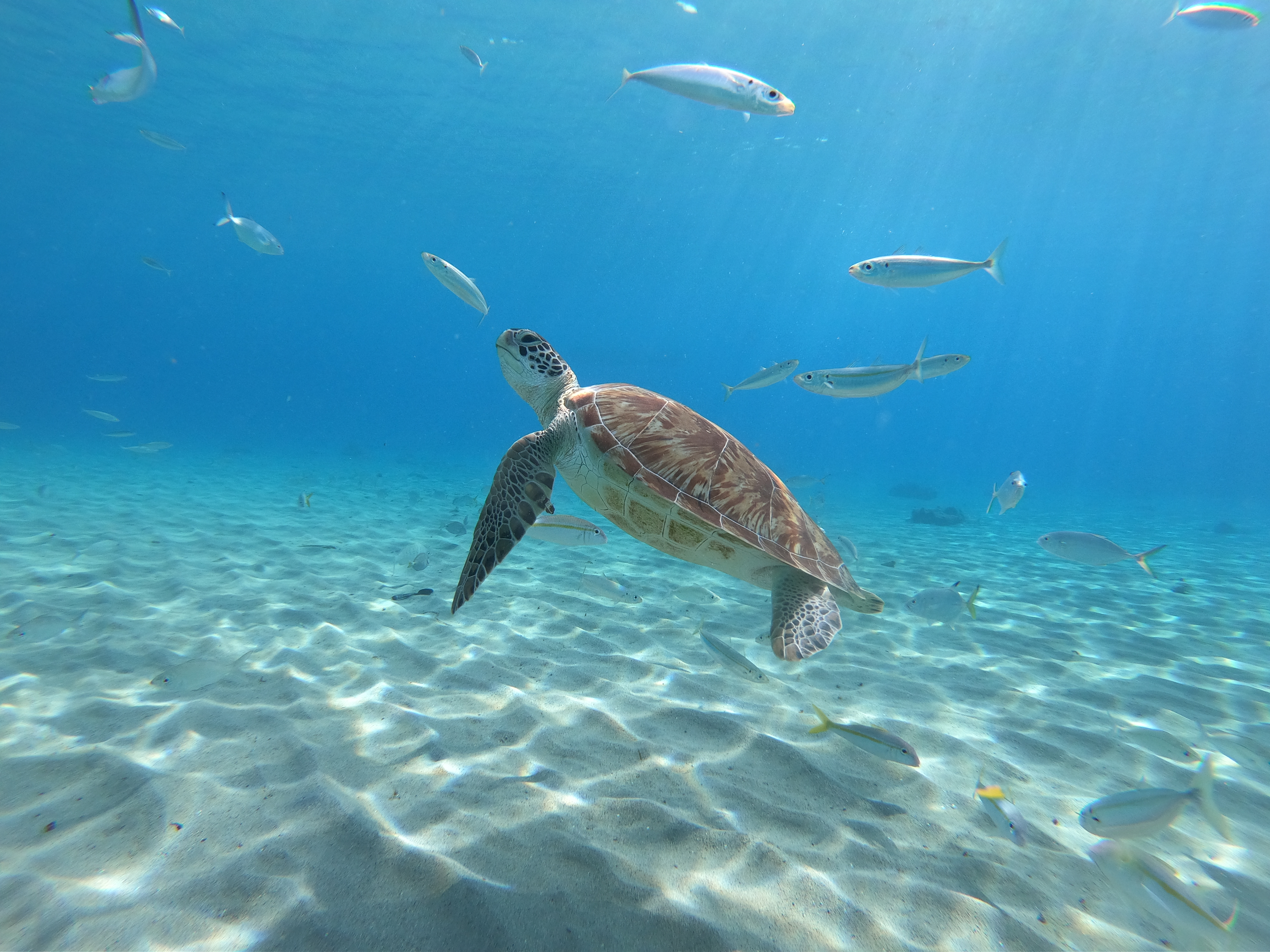
Swimming over the sand plateau at playa Grandi, Curaçao

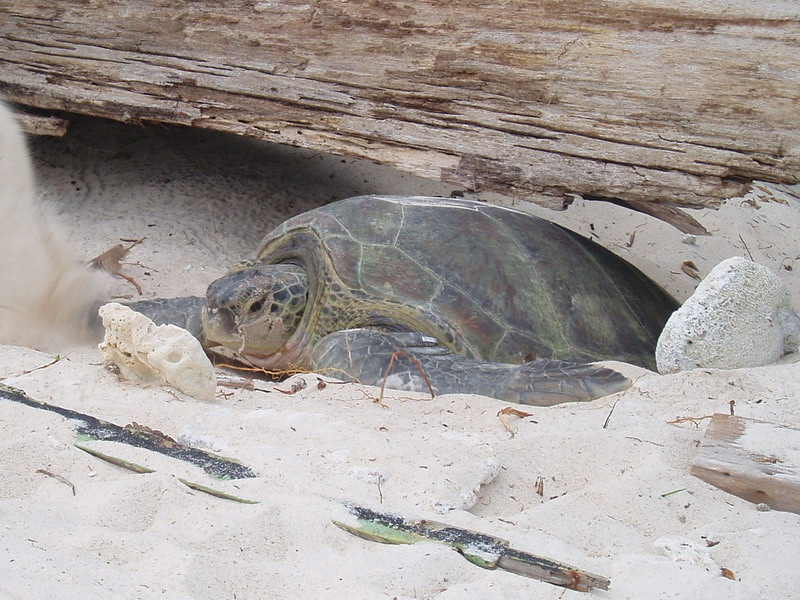
Female returning to the sea after nesting in Redang Island, Malaysia

Group of basking C. mydas at Poipu beach, Kauai

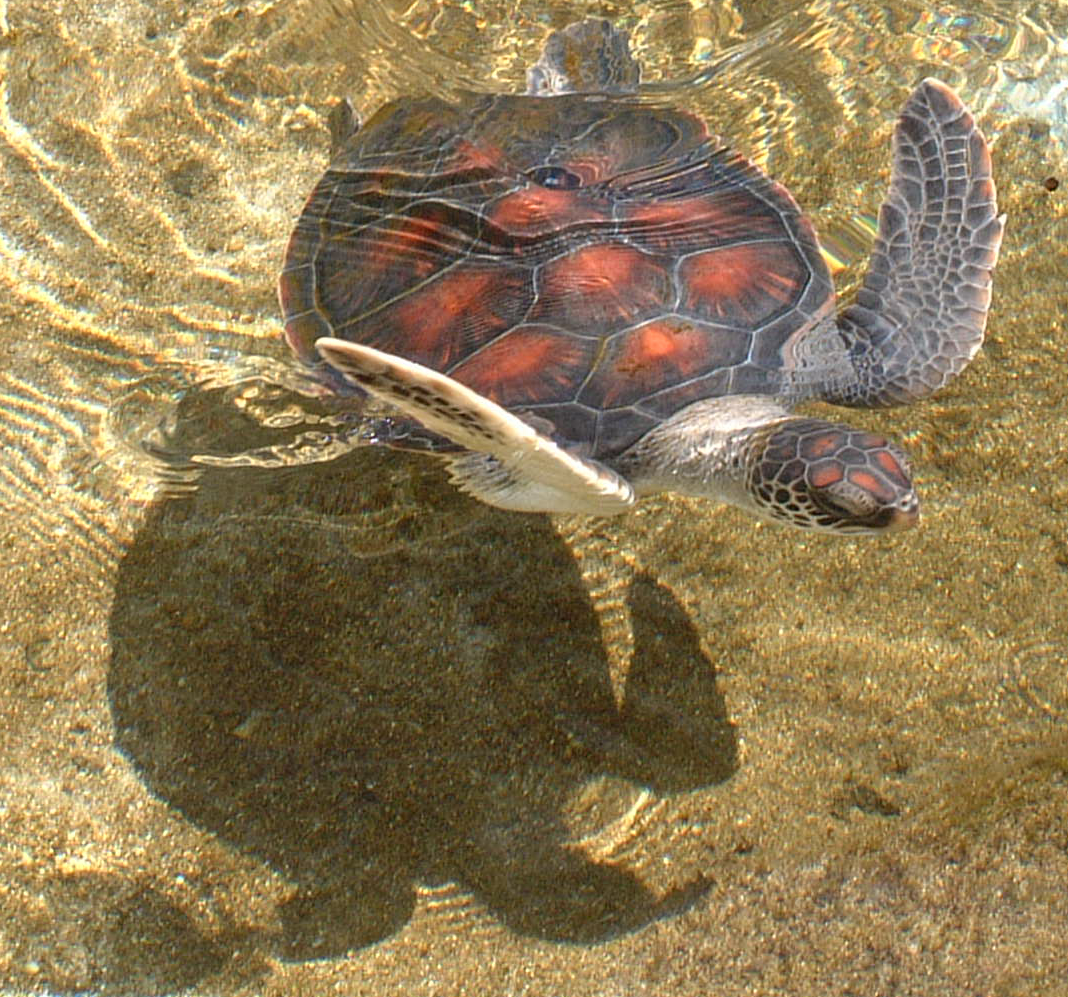
Immature Hawaiian C. mydas

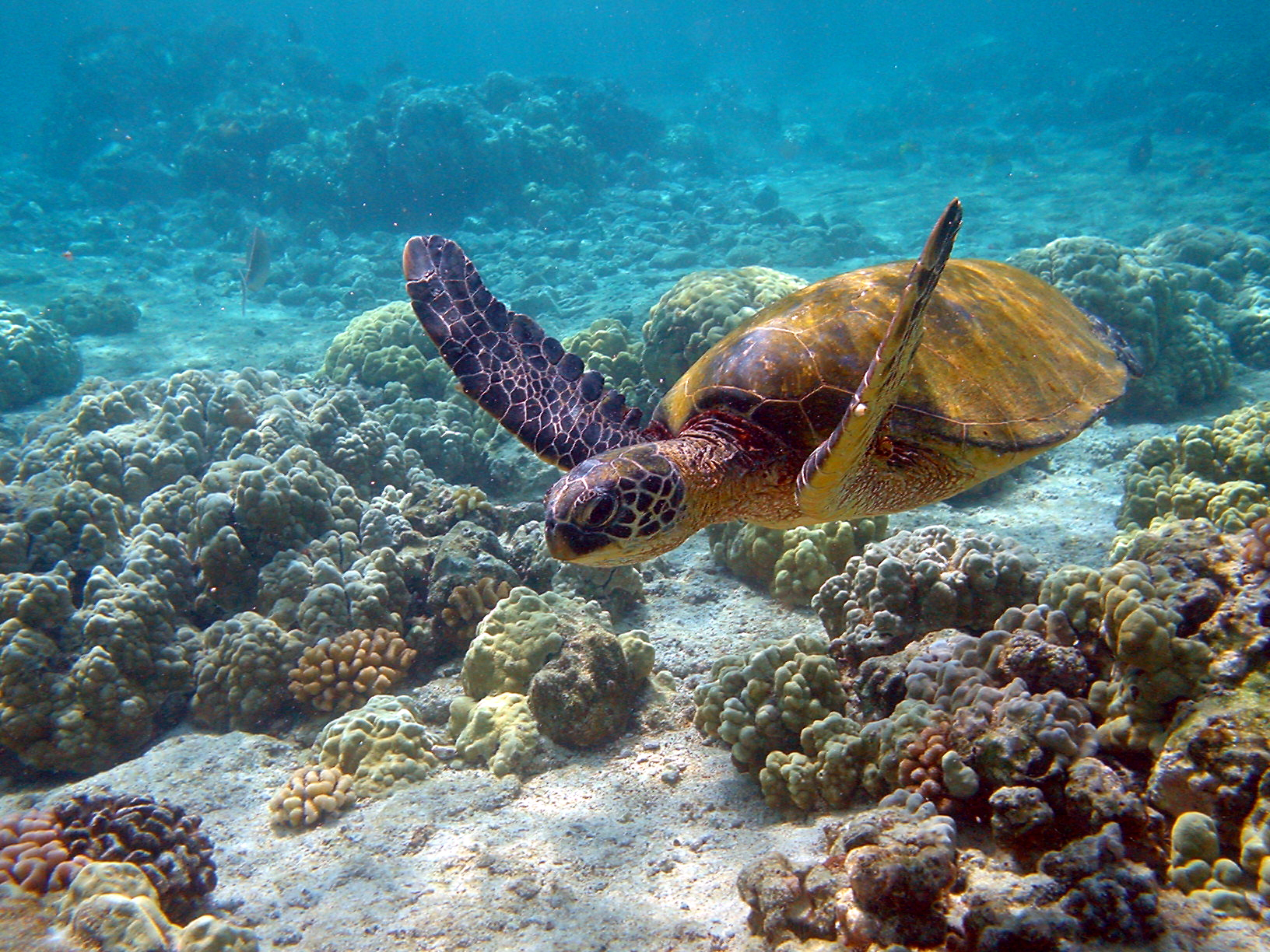
In Hawaii

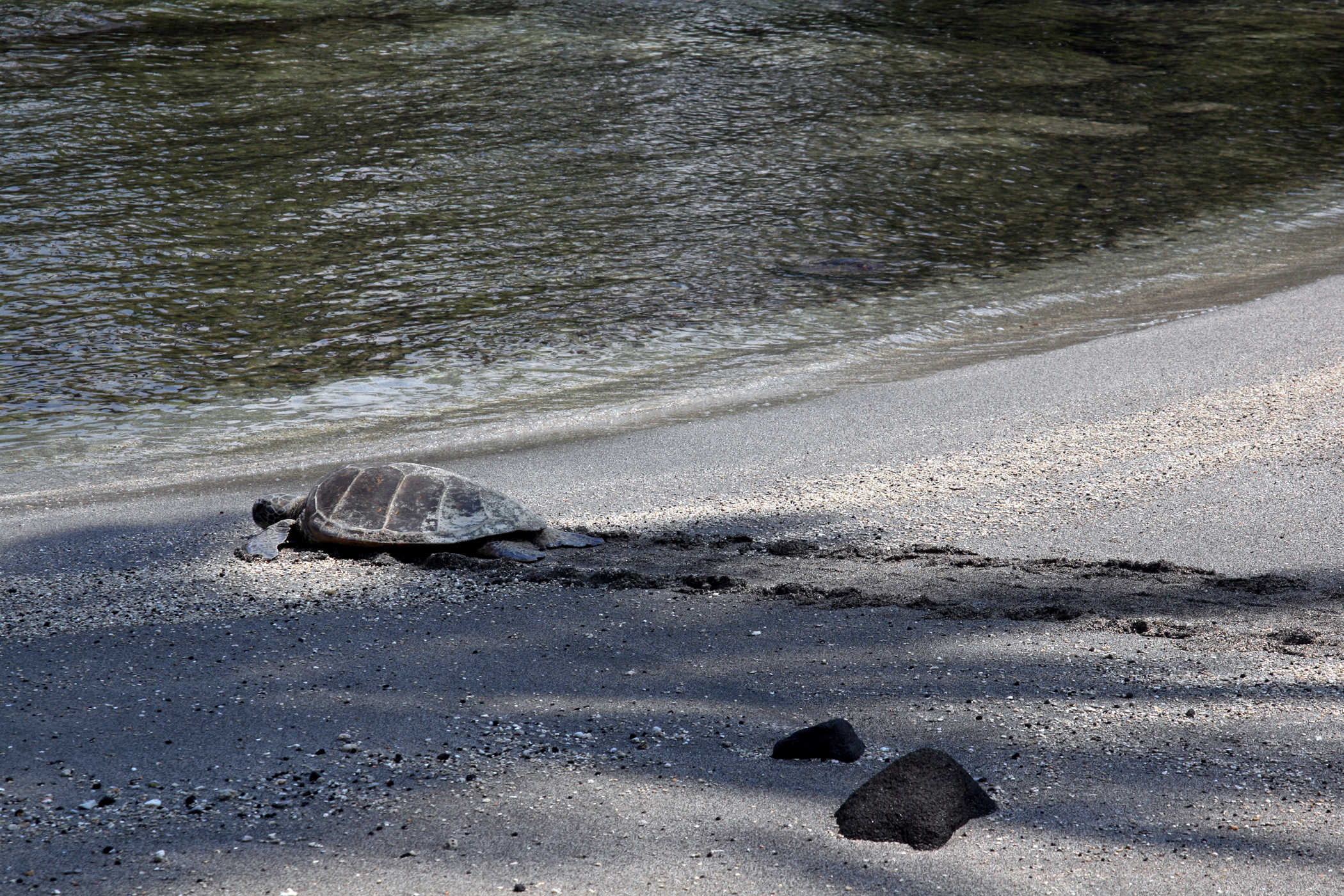
Heading for the ocean on a beach at the Pu'uhonua o Honaunau National Historical Park

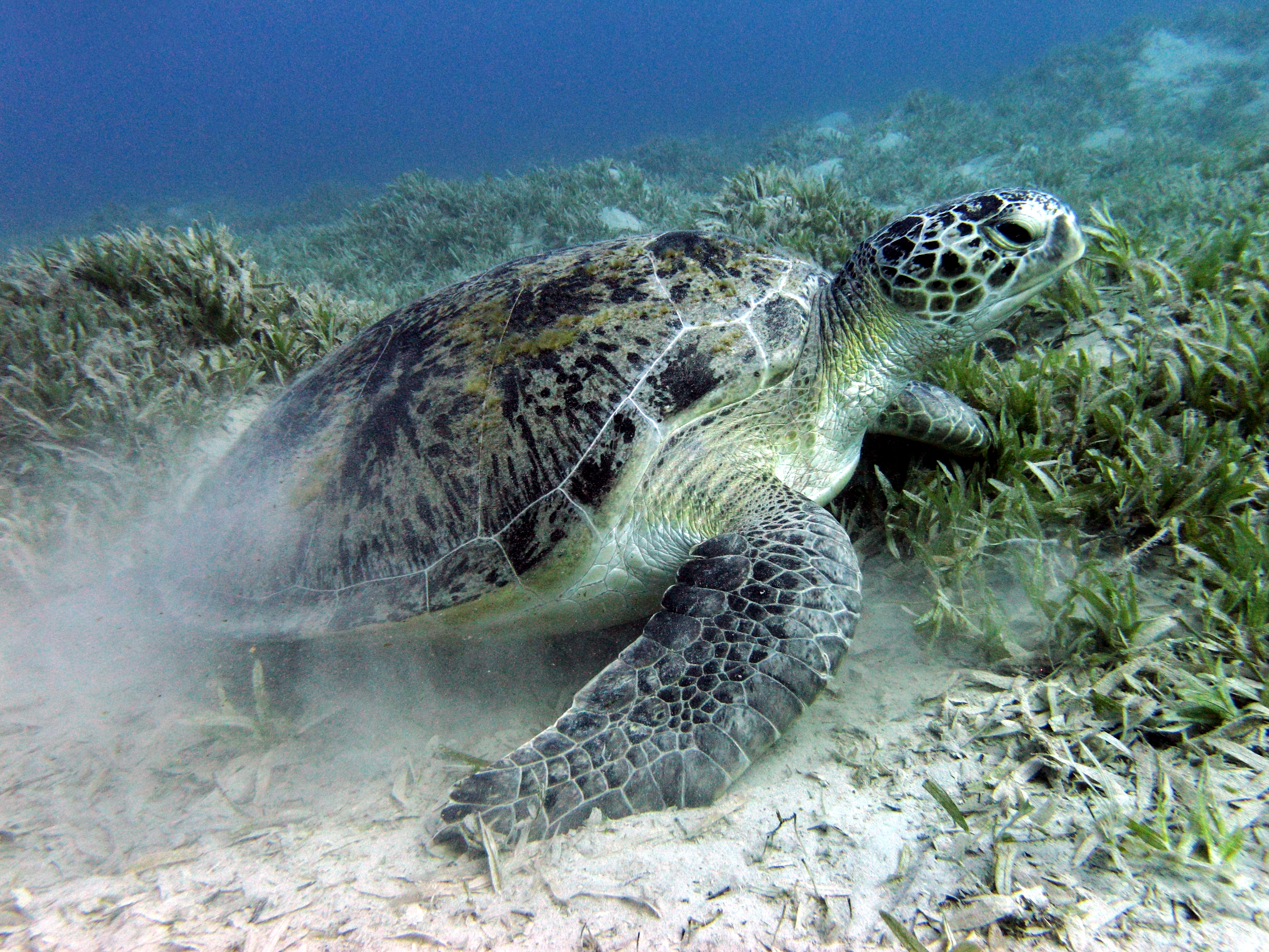
In the Red Sea

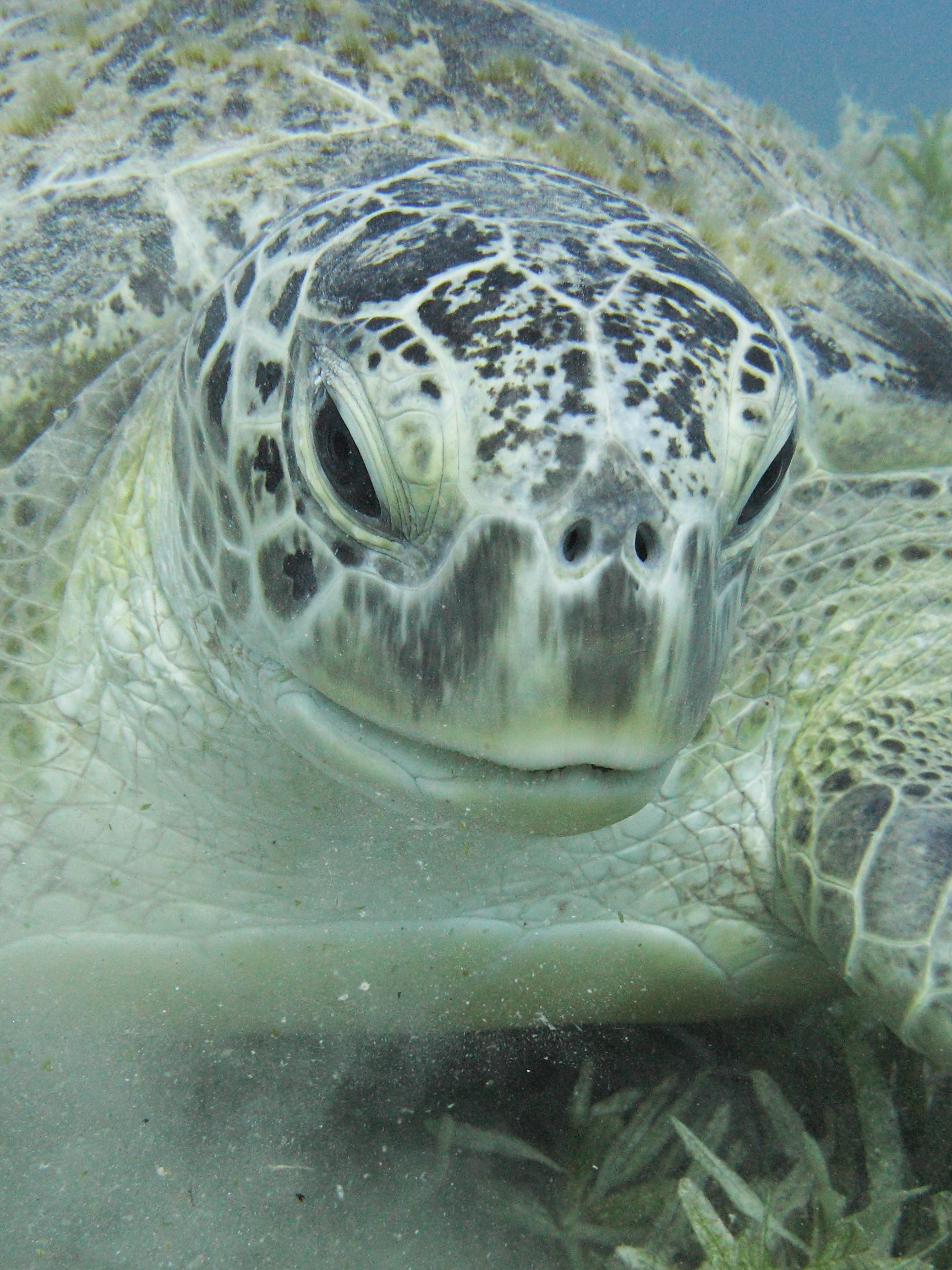
In the Red Sea

== See also ==
- Sea Turtle Association of Japan, Kuroshima Research Station
- T.K. Bellis The "Turtle King".
