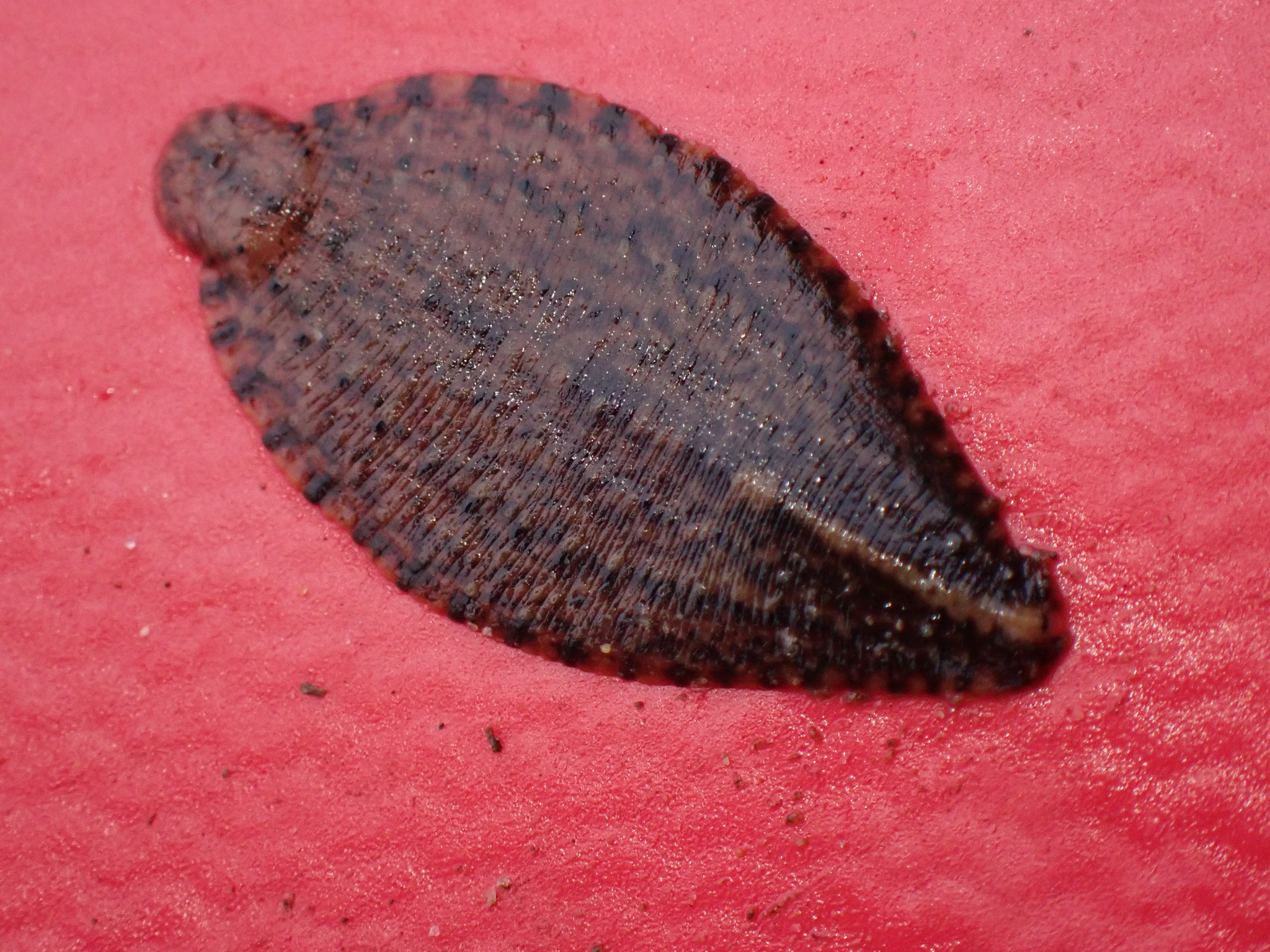
- Placobdella costata in Jeti, Estonia

Scientific classification
- Kingdom: Animalia
- Phylum: Annelida
- Clade: Pleistoannelida
- Clade: Sedentaria
- Class: Clitellata
- Subclass: Hirudinea
- Order: Rhynchobdellida
- Family: Glossiphoniidae
- Genus: Placobdella
- Species: P. costata

Binomial name
- Placobdella costata (Müller, 1846)

Synonyms
- Clepsine catenigera (Moquin-Tandon, 1846); Clepsine costata Müller, 1846; Glossiphonia catenigera Moquin-Tandon, 1846; Placobdella catenigera (Moquin-Tandon, 1846)

= Placobdella costata =

Species of leech

Placobdella costata is a species of Glossiphoniid leech found in European waters.

== Classification ==
Placobdella costata was described as Clespine costata by Friedrich Müller, in 1846, and it then underwent several name changes and reclassifications. Glossiphonia catenigera, a different name for the same organism, was described in the same year by Alfred Moquin-Tandon and is treated as a junior synonym. As Raphaël Blanchard noted in an 1893 paper, the species "was described at almost the same time by Moquin-Tandon and by Fr. Müller." Nonetheless, Blanchard took Müller's name as the basionym for the species which was then called Placobdella catenigera, and listed Moquin-Tandon's species as a synonym, along with a couple other names, a classification which has endured.

Genetic analyses have placed Placobdella costata as sister to a clade comprising P. phalera and P. transfuscens. This clade of three species is in turn sister to a clade which includes Placobdella parasitica, a common North American species.

Phylogeny of P. costata and related species

- - Helobdella spp. + Haementeria spp.
  - - Other Placobdella spp.
    - - - - P. phalera
          - P. transfuscens
        - P. costata
      - - P. parasitica
        - - P. ornata
          - - P. papillifera
            - P. multilineata

After Siddall et al., 2006

== Distribution ==
Placobdella costata is found in much of central Europe, and is "widely distributed... in the European Mediterranean area", as well as being found from Morocco to Iran and Caucasia, the Scandinavian and Arabian peninsulas. In Great Britain, where it was first described in 1979, it is very rare. In the Iberian peninsula, it is known from the northern and central regions, as well as Andalusia.

== Description ==
Placobdella costata is a large, elliptical, flattened leech, with somewhat variable colour. At rest, the adults are between 2 and 7 centimetres (0.79 and 2.76 in) long, and between 0.6 and 2.5 centimetres (0.24 and 0.98 in) wide. In colour the leeches can be greenish-brown, dark brown, blue-green, or, more often, yellowish-brown. They have an interrupted dark brown band down the middle of their backs.

Placobdella costata is somewhat unusual among Glossiphoniid leeches in that its mouth is located towards the front of its anterior sucker, while in many other species the mouth is in the centre of the sucker. This forwards mouth is shared by other species which parasitize mammals and reptiles, including Haementeria ghilianii.

=== Eyes ===
Leeches have exhibit a variety of eye types, numbers, and arrangements, and are therefore "taxonomically invaluable". Within the family Glossiphoniidae alone there is considerable diversity. Placobdella costata at first appears to have two very close, often touching, eyes on its third segment, but more detailed observation with the use of histological techniques has shown that the leeches additionally have a pair of small, "rudimentary" eyes, anterior to and below its primary pair.

== Bibliography ==
- Blanchard, Raphaël (1893). "Courtes notices sur les Hirudinées" [Short notes on the Hirudinea]. Bulletin de la Société zoologique de France (in French). 18.
- Elliott, J. M.; Mugridge, R. E. R.; Stallybrass, H. G. (Oct 1979). "Haementeria costata (Hirudinea: Glossiphoniidae), a leech new to Britain". Freshwater Biology. 9 (5): 461–465. doi:10.1111/j.1365-2427.1979.tb01530.x. eISSN 1365-2427. ISSN 0046-5070.
- Elliott, J.M.; Tullett, P.A. (1982). Provisional Atlas of the Freshwater Leeches of the British Isles (PDF). Occasional Publication No. 14. Freshwater Biological Association. ISSN 0308-6739.
- d'Hondt, Jean-Loup; Ben Ahmed, Raja (2009). "Catalogue et Clés Tabulaires de Détermination des Hirudinées d'eau douce de la Faune Française" [Catalogue and identification key for freshwater Hirudinea of French fauna]. Bulletin de la Société zoologique de France (in French). 134: 272.
- Richardson, Dennis J.; Hammond, Charlotte I.; Moser, William E.; Phillips, Anna J.; Lazo-Wasem, Eric A.; Barger, Michael A. (2020-10-27). "Molecular Variation and Biogeography of the Common North American Turtle Leech, Placobdella parasitica". Bulletin of the Peabody Museum of Natural History. 61 (2). doi:10.3374/014.061.0201. ISSN 0079-032X.
- Romero, David; Duarte, Jesús; Narváez-Ledesma, Lucía; Farfán, Miguel; Real, Raimundo (2014). "Presence of the leech Placobdella costata in the south of the Iberian Peninsula". Acta Parasitologica. 59 (2). doi:10.2478/s11686-014-0232-4. ISSN 1896-1851.
- Sawyer, Roy T. (1986). Leech Biology and Behaviour Volume I: Anatomy, Physiology, and Behaviour. Oxford Science Publishing. ISBN 0-19-857377-4.
- Siddall, Mark E.; Bely, Alexandra E.; Borda, Elizabeth (2006). "Chapter 9: Hirudinida". In Rouse, Greg; Pleijel, Frederick (eds.). Reproductive Biology and Phylogeny of Annelida. Taylor & Francis.
