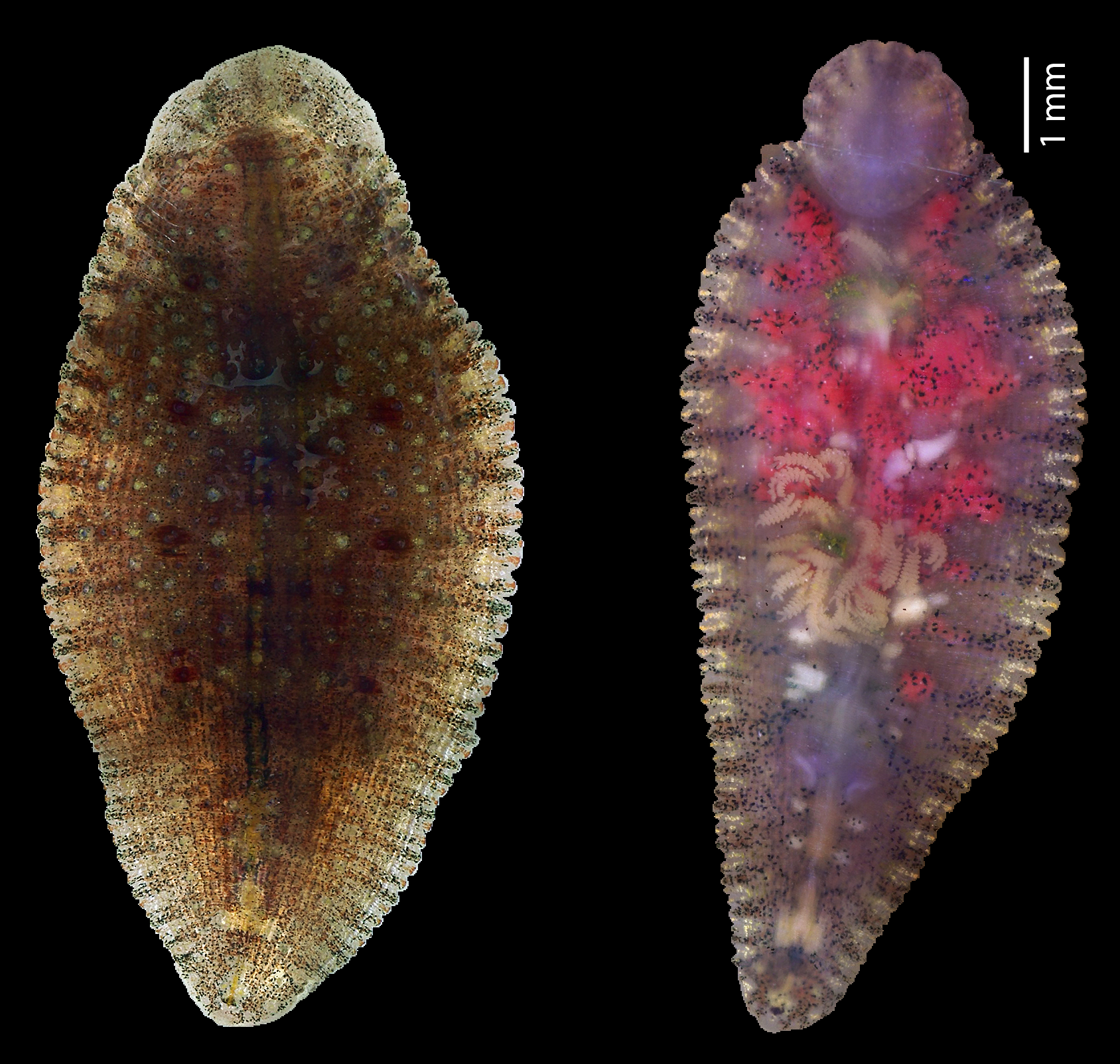
- Placobdelloides siamensis: left, dorsal view; right: ventral view.

Scientific classification
- Kingdom: Animalia
- Phylum: Annelida
- Clade: Pleistoannelida
- Clade: Sedentaria
- Class: Clitellata
- Subclass: Hirudinea
- Order: Rhynchobdellida
- Family: Glossiphoniidae
- Genus: Placobdelloides
- Species: P. siamensis

Binomial name
- Placobdelloides siamensis (Oka, 1917) Sawyer, 1986

Synonyms
- Hemiclepsis siamensis Oka, 1917

= Placobdelloides siamensis =

Species of leeches

Placobdelloides siamensis is a species of blood-feeding jawless leech in the family Glossiphoniidae. It is commonly known as the Siam shield leech and is a prevalent ectoparasite on Malayemys turtles but has a range of Geoemydidae hosts. In high numbers it can cause severe anaemia and malnutrition which can lead to the death of its host.

== Taxonomy ==
The species was first described as Hemiclepsis siamensis by Oka in 1917 then transferred by Sawyer to his new genus Placobdelloides in 1986. In 2018, it was redescribed from specimens collected in Thailand.

== Hosts ==
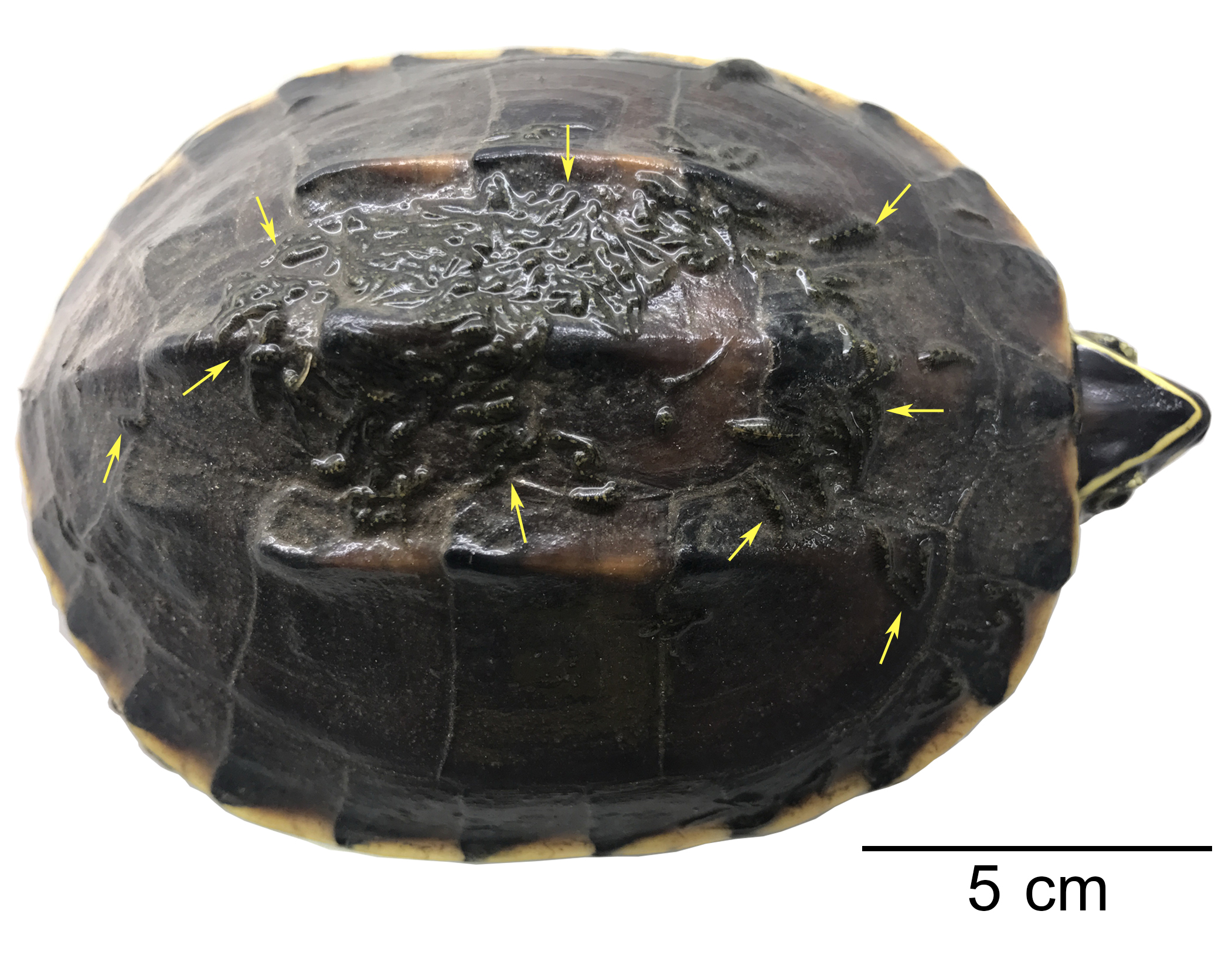
Placobdelloides siamensis on the carapace of Malayemys subtrijuga (arrows)

The type host is the Black Marsh Turtle, Siebenrockiella crassicollis. Other hosts include the Southeast Asian Box Turtle, Cuora amboinensis, the Yellow-headed Temple Turtle, Heosemys annandalii, the Mekong Snail-eating Turtle Malayemys subtrijuga, the Malayan Snail-eating Turtle Malayemys macrocephala, the Khorat Snail-eating Turtle Malayemys khoratensis, Oldham's lead turtle Cyclemys oldhamii and the giant Asian pond turtle Heosemys grandis.
