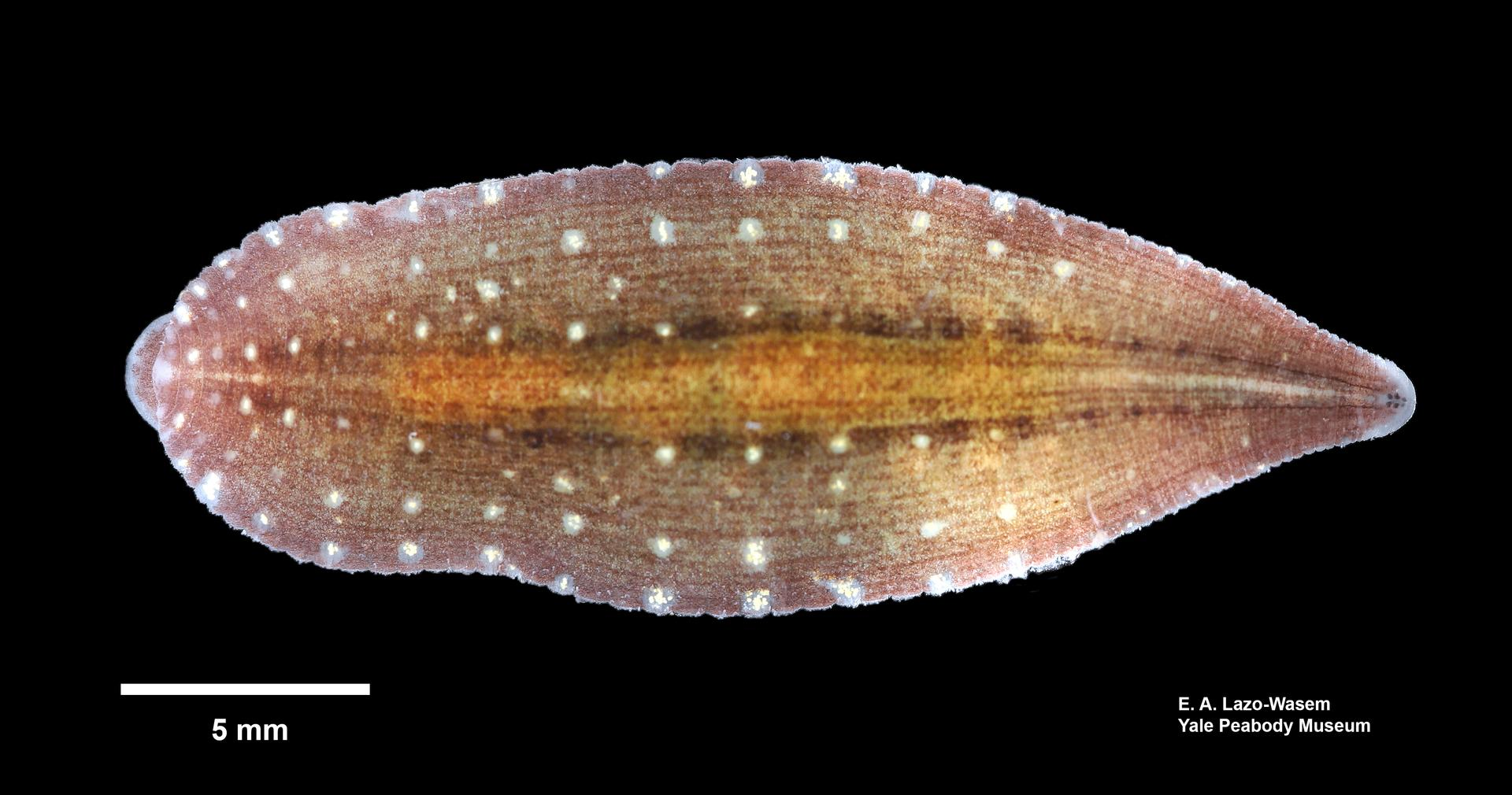

Scientific classification
- Kingdom: Animalia
- Phylum: Annelida
- Clade: Pleistoannelida
- Clade: Sedentaria
- Class: Clitellata
- Subclass: Hirudinea
- Order: Rhynchobdellida
- Family: Glossiphoniidae
- Genus: Glossiphonia
- Species: G. elegans

Binomial name
- Glossiphonia elegans (Verrill, 1872)

= Glossiphonia elegans =

Species of leech

Glossiphonia elegans, sometimes called the brook leech, is a species of freshwater jawless leech found in Canada and the United States.

== Taxonomy ==
Glossiphonia elegans was first described in an 1872 article by Addison Emery Verrill published in the American Journal of Science. He named it Clespine elegans, describing it along with several other new Clespine species. Verrill placed his new species in "section C" (species with six ocelli), "sub-section b" (species with papillae on their backs) of the genus Clespine. He gave the species' type locality as "West River near New Haven", as with many of the species described in the paper. W. E. Castle, in a 1900 paper on the Rhynchobdellida of North America, renamed Verrill's species Glossiphonia elegans, listing Clespine elegans Verrill, 1872 and Clespine patelliformis Nicholson, 1873 as synonyms. John Percy Moore, in his landmark 1901 monograph The Hirudinea of Illinois, listed Clespine elegans as a synonym of the European species Glossiphonia complanata, believing the two to be conspecific populations on different continents. Some publications from the early 20th century listed G. elegans as a full species, such as and, but Moore remained convinced they were synonymous, stating in a 1952 paper that "there is no reason" to regard Clespine elegans as anything "other than the very variable and very widely distributed Glossiphonia complanata".

In 2005, a paper by Mark Siddall, Rebecca Budinoff, and Elizabeth Borda reviewed the systematics of the Glossiphoniidae, reviving Glossiphonia elegans (Verrill, 1872) on the basis of genetic variation from the European forms of G. complanata. A 2012 paper published in Zootaxa looked at the issue in detail. Leeches identified as G. elegans were collected from West River, Connecticut and their DNA was analyzed. The paper confirmed G. elegans as a distinct species separate from G. complanata. In 2019, a paper by two Canadian biologists published in the Journal of Natural History provided further evidence that the two species are distinct. The authors sampled leeches collected on ROM expeditions from a wide range in North America (British Columbia, Alberta, Saskatchewan, Manitoba, Ontario, and Nebraska) and Europe (Slovenia and Croatia). Further DNA sequences stored in GenBank were also used in the study. The resulting phylogenetic analysis showed the North American and European populations do not form a monophyletic clade. Both maximum parsimony and maximum likelihood techniques were used to produce phylogenetic trees, and they yielded results with similar general topology. A simplified tree with a general topology present in both trees is shown below, with Moore's non-monophyletic circumscription added for reference:

Simplified phylogenetic tree

- - Glossiphonia
    - Glossiphonia elegans
    - - - Glossiphonia complanata
        - Glossiphonia sp. (Russia)
      - Other Glossiphonia spp.
  - Theromyzon bifarium (outgroup)

After Mack & Kvist, 2019 pp. 344–5

== Bibliography ==
- Castle, William E. (1900). "Some North American fresh-water Rhynchobdellidae and their parasites". Bulletin of the Museum of Comparative Zoology at Harvard College. 36 (1): 17–64.
- Mack, Joseph; Kvist, Sebastian (2019). "Improved geographic sampling provides further evidence for the separation of Glossiphonia complanata and Glossiphonia elegans (Annelida: Clitellata: Glossiphoniidae)". Journal of Natural History. 53 (5–6): 335–350. Bibcode:2019JNatH..53..335M. doi:10.1080/00222933.2019.1590658.
