= Linta =

Linta may refer to:

- Linta River, river in Madagascar
- Linta (surname), list of people with the surname
- USS Linta (SP-721), a United States Navy patrol vessel in commission from 1917 to 1919
- Linta (leech), a monotypic leech genus
