= Hemiclepsis =

Scientific classification
- Kingdom: Animalia
- Phylum: Annelida
- Clade: Pleistoannelida
- Clade: Sedentaria
- Class: Clitellata
- Subclass: Hirudinea
- Order: Rhynchobdellida
- Family: Glossiphoniidae
- Genus: Hemiclepsis; Vejdovský, 1884

Genus of annelid worms

Hemiclepsis is a genus of leeches belonging to the family Glossiphoniidae.

The species of this genus are found in Eurasia.

Species:

- Hemiclepsis chharwardamensis Mandal, 2013
- Hemiclepsis marginata (Müller, 1774)
