= Emys macrocephala =

Emys macrocephala may refer to:

- Big-headed Amazon River turtle, a turtle with the synonym Emys macrocephala
- Malayan snail-eating turtle, a turtle with the synonym Emys macrocephala
- Diamondback terrapin, a turtle with the synonym Emys macrocephala
