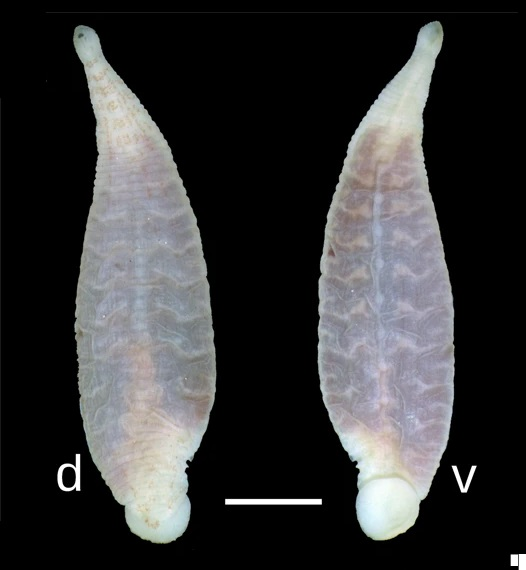
- Batracobdelloides conchophylus

Scientific classification
- Domain: Eukaryota
- Kingdom: Animalia
- Phylum: Annelida
- Clade: Pleistoannelida
- Clade: Sedentaria
- Class: Clitellata
- Subclass: Hirudinea
- Order: Rhynchobdellida
- Family: Glossiphoniidae
- Genus: Batracobdelloides; Oosthuizen, 1986

= Batracobdelloides =

Genus of annelid worms

Batracobdelloides is a genus of annelids belonging to the family Glossiphoniidae.

The species of this genus are found in Europe and Southern Africa.

Species:

- Batracobdelloides conchophylus Bolotov, Klass, Bespalaya, Konopleva, Kondakov & Vikhrev, 2019
- Batracobdelloides hlaingbweensis Bolotov, Klass, Bespalaya, Konopleva, Kondakov & Vikhrev, 2019
- Batracobdelloides indochinensis Bolotov, Klass, Bespalaya, Konopleva, Kondakov & Vikhrev, 2019
- Batracobdelloides koreanus Bolotov, Klass, Bespalaya, Konopleva, Kondakov & Vikhrev, 2019
- Batracobdelloides moogi Nesemann & Csanyi, 1995
- Batracobdelloides tricarinata (Blanchard, 1897)
- Batracobdelloides yaukthwa Bolotov, Klass, Bespalaya, Konopleva, Kondakov & Vikhrev, 2019
