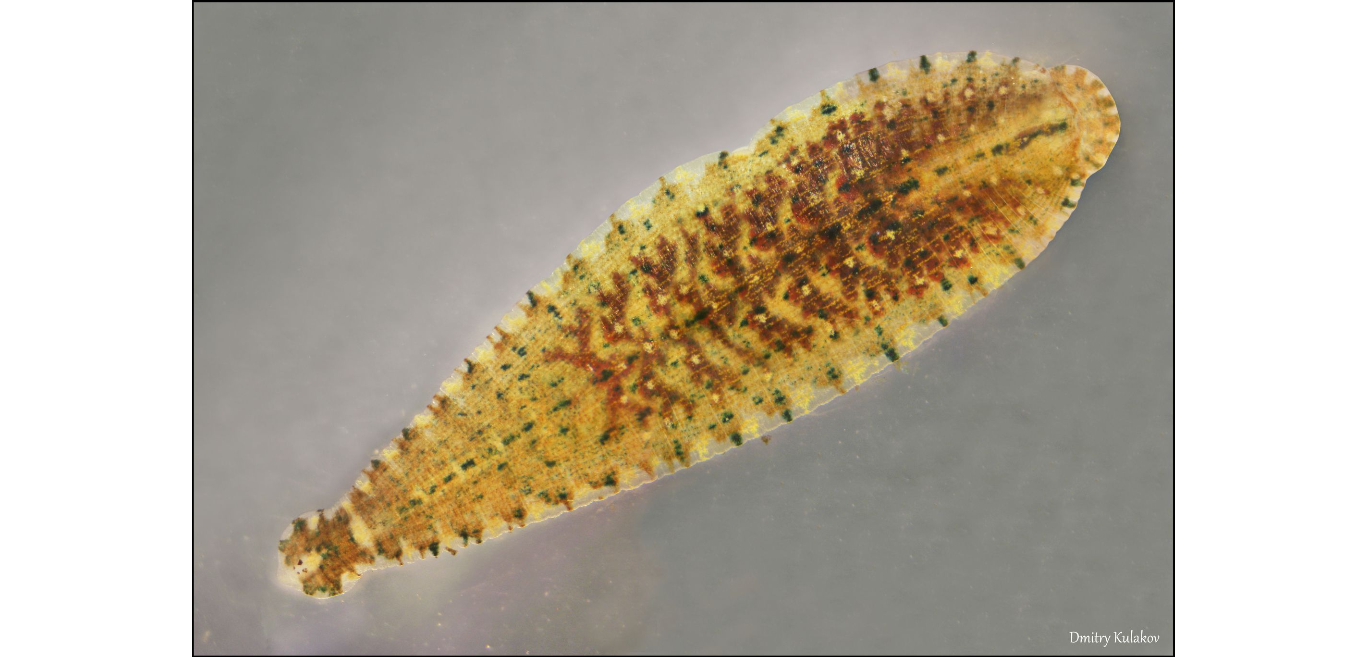

Scientific classification
- Domain: Eukaryota
- Kingdom: Animalia
- Phylum: Annelida
- Clade: Pleistoannelida
- Clade: Sedentaria
- Class: Clitellata
- Subclass: Hirudinea
- Order: Rhynchobdellida
- Family: Glossiphoniidae
- Genus: Hemiclepsis
- Species: H. marginata

Binomial name
- Hemiclepsis marginata (Müller, 1773)

= Hemiclepsis marginata =

Species of annelid

Hemiclepsis marginata is a species of annelids belonging to the family Glossiphoniidae.

The species is found in Eurasia.
