= Torix =

Torix may refer to:

- TorIX, or the Toronto Internet Exchange
- Torix, a genus of freshwater leeches
