= Alboglossiphonia heteroclita =

Scientific classification
- Kingdom: Animalia
- Phylum: Annelida
- Clade: Pleistoannelida
- Clade: Sedentaria
- Class: Clitellata
- Subclass: Hirudinea
- Order: Rhynchobdellida
- Family: Glossiphoniidae
- Genus: Alboglossiphonia
- Species: A. heteroclita

Binomial name
- Alboglossiphonia heteroclita (Linnaeus, 1761)

Synonyms
- Glossiphonia heteroclita (Linnaeus, 1761)

Species of annelid worm

Alboglossiphonia heteroclita is a species of leeches belonging to the family Glossiphoniidae. It is distributed across the Holarctic region, in North America and Eurasia. The species is a predator, feeding on freshwater invertebrates, including gastropods, isopods, and certain oligochaetes. They employ a sit-and-wait hunting strategy, and are usually relatively immobile.
