= Haementeria officinalis =

Scientific classification
- Domain: Eukaryota
- Kingdom: Animalia
- Phylum: Annelida
- Clade: Pleistoannelida
- Clade: Sedentaria
- Class: Clitellata
- Subclass: Hirudinea
- Order: Rhynchobdellida
- Family: Glossiphoniidae
- Genus: Haementeria
- Species: H. officinalis

Binomial name
- Haementeria officinalis de Filippi, 1849

Species of annelid

Haementeria officinalis is a species of leeches found in Mexico. Its salivary glands produce the protein antistasin, which prevents blood clotting by inhibiting factor Xa.

== See also ==
- Direct factor Xa inhibitor
