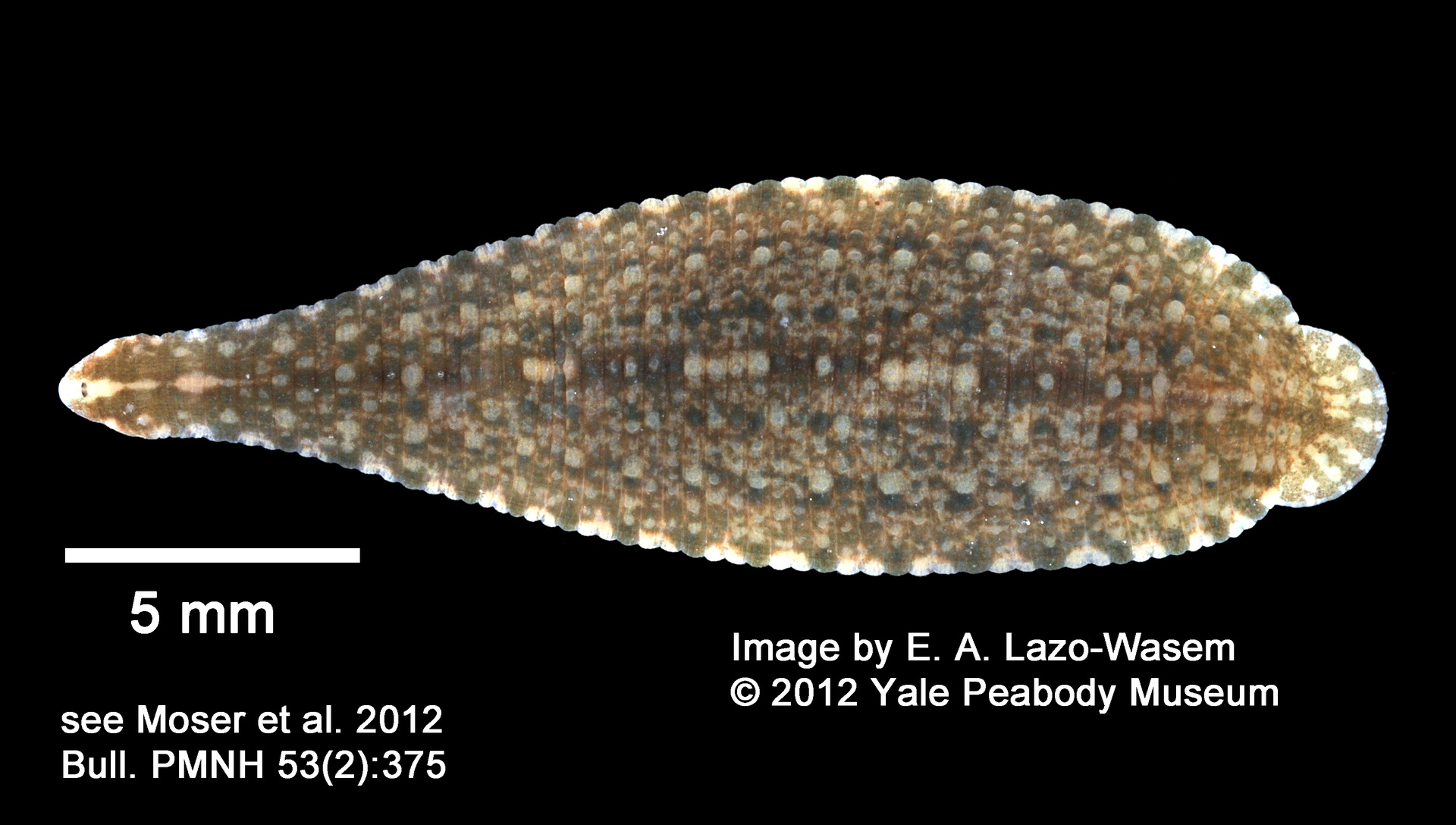
- P. rugosa

Scientific classification
- Kingdom: Animalia
- Phylum: Annelida
- Clade: Pleistoannelida
- Clade: Sedentaria
- Class: Clitellata
- Subclass: Hirudinea
- Order: Rhynchobdellida
- Family: Glossiphoniidae
- Genus: Placobdella; Blanchard, 1893

= Placobdella =

Genus of annelid worms

Placobdella is a genus of leeches in the family Glossiphoniidae. Species can grow up to 6.5 cm in length, have extremely close eyes and mouths located on the rim or near the anterior (front) sucker.

The genus has an almost cosmopolitan distribution.

== Species ==
The World Register of Marine Species lists 15 species:

- Placobdella akahkway Fan, De Carle & Kvist, 2022
- Placobdella costata (Müller, 1846)
- Placobdella kwetlumye Oceguera-Figueroa et al. 2010
- Placobdella multilineata Moore, 1953
- Placobdella nabeulensis Ahmed et al. 2023
- Placobdella ornata (Verrill, 1872)
- Placobdella parasitica (Say, 1824)
- Placobdella pediculata Hemingway, 1908
- Placobdella ringueleti Lopez-Jimenez & Oceguera-Figueroa, 2009
- Placobdella rugosa (Verrill, 1874)
- Placobdella siddalli Richardson & Moser in Richardson et al., 2017
- Placobdella sophieae Oceguera-Figueroa et al. 2010
