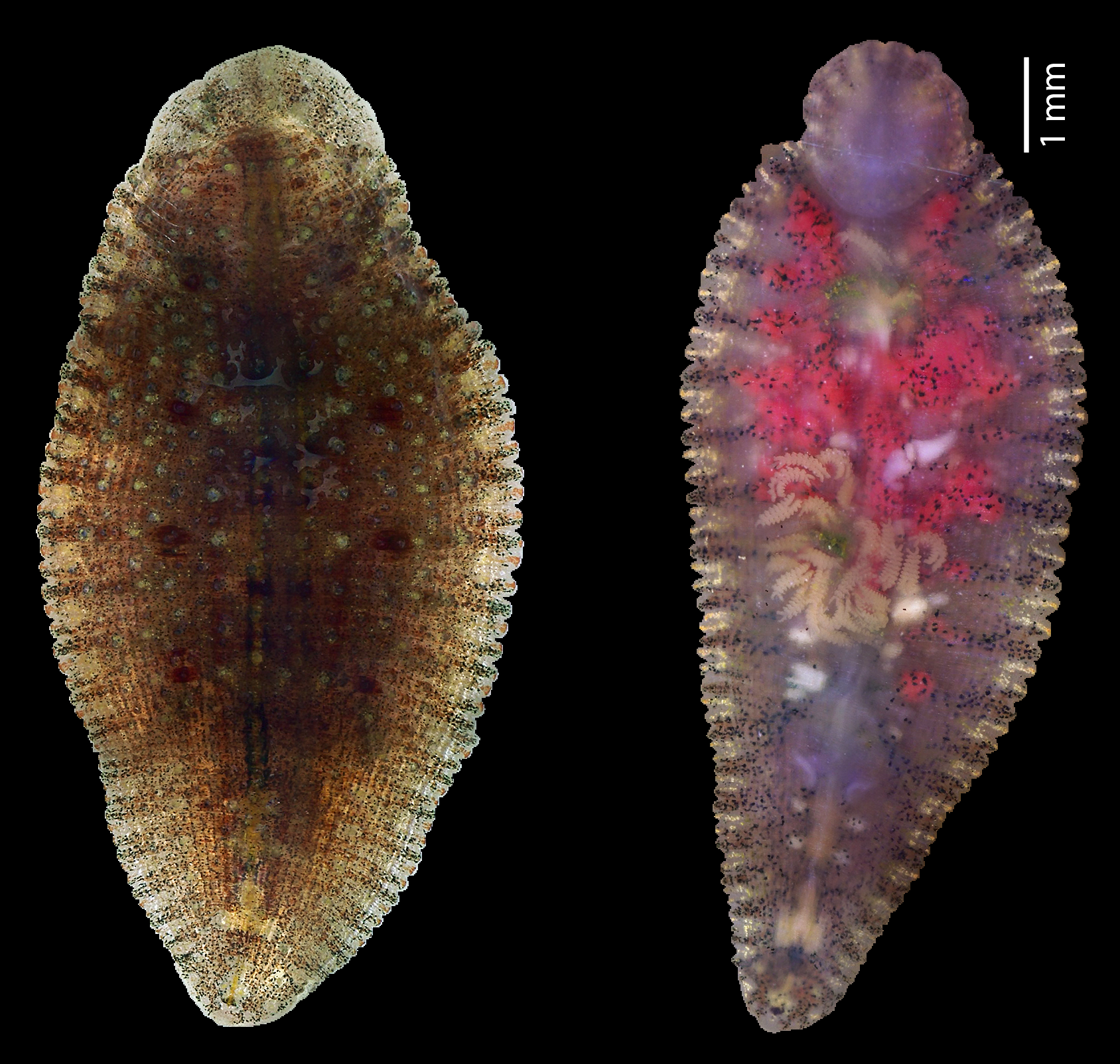
- Placobdelloides siamensis

Scientific classification
- Kingdom: Animalia
- Phylum: Annelida
- Clade: Pleistoannelida
- Clade: Sedentaria
- Class: Clitellata
- Subclass: Hirudinea
- Order: Rhynchobdellida
- Family: Glossiphoniidae
- Genus: Placobdelloides; Sawyer, 1986

= Placobdelloides =

Genus of annelids

Placobdelloides is a genus of glossophoniid leeches.

== Description ==
Species of Placobdelloides lack a jaw and usually feed with a protrusible proboscis; they are predacious or sanguivorous, or both, on a variety of prey such as shrimps, waterfowl, fish, amphibians, turtles, crocodiles or mammals.

== Species ==
The genus includes 17 species found worldwide:

- Placobdelloides bancrofti (Best, 1931)
- Placobdelloides bdellae (Ingram, 1957)
- Placobdelloides emydae (Harding, 1924)
- Placobdelloides fimbriata (Johansson, 1909)
- Placobdelloides fulva (Harding, 1921)
- Placobdelloides horai (Baugh, 1960)
- Placobdelloides indica (Baugh, 1960)
- Placobdelloides jaegerskioeldi (Johansson, 1909)
- Placobdelloides maorica (Benham, 1907)
- Placobdelloides multistriata (Johansson, 1909)
- Placobdelloides octostriata (Grube, 1866)
- Placobdelloides okadai (Oka, 1925)
- Placobdelloides okai (Soós, 1969)
- Placobdelloides siamensis (Oka, 1917)
- Placobdelloides sirikanchanae Trivalairat, Chiangkul & Purivirojkul, 2019
- Placobdelloides stellapapillosa Goverdich et al., 2002
- Placobdelloides undulata (Harding, 1924)
