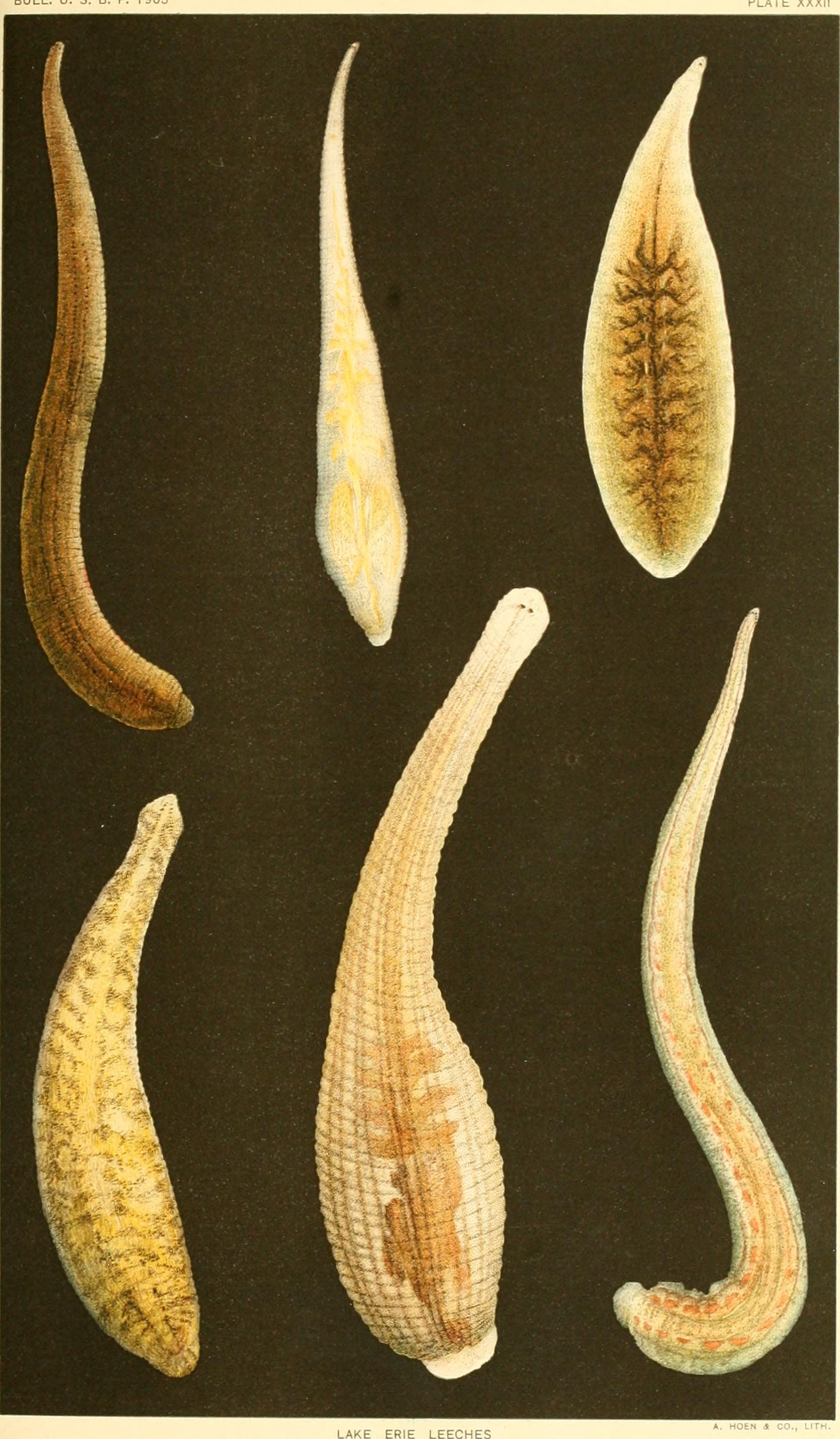

Scientific classification
- Kingdom: Animalia
- Phylum: Annelida
- Clade: Pleistoannelida
- Clade: Sedentaria
- Class: Clitellata
- Subclass: Hirudinea
- Order: Rhynchobdellida
- Family: Glossiphoniidae
- Genus: Glossiphonia; Johnson, 1816

Synonyms
- Boreobdella Johansson, 1929

= Glossiphonia =

Genus of annelid worms

Glossiphonia is a genus of Glossiphoniidae.

The genus was described in 1816 by James Rawlins Johnson.

It has cosmopolitan distribution.

Species:

- Glossiphonia complanata (Linnaeus, 1758)
- Glossiphonia concolor (Aphathy, 1888)
- Glossiphonia elegans (Verrill, 1872)
- Glossiphonia heteroclita (Linnaeus, 1761)
- Glossiphonia lata (Oka, 1910)
- Glossiphonia smaragdina (Oka, 1910)
- Glossiphonia verrucata (Müller, 1844)
