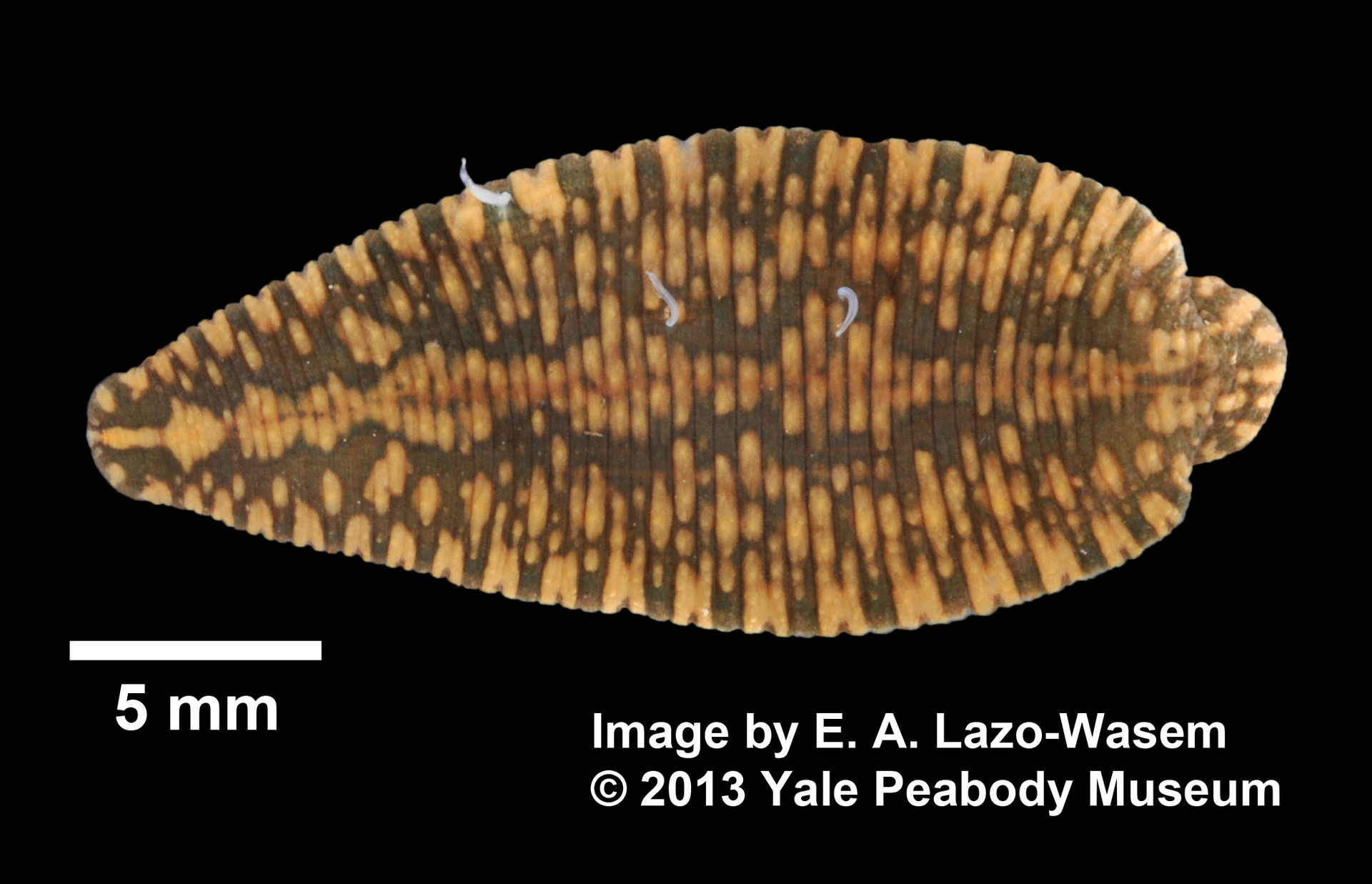

Scientific classification
- Kingdom: Animalia
- Phylum: Annelida
- Clade: Pleistoannelida
- Clade: Sedentaria
- Class: Clitellata
- Subclass: Hirudinea
- Order: Rhynchobdellida
- Family: Glossiphoniidae
- Genus: Placobdella
- Species: P. parasitica

Binomial name
- Placobdella parasitica (Say, 1824)

Synonyms
- Hirudo parasitica Say, 1824

= Placobdella parasitica =

Species of annelid worm

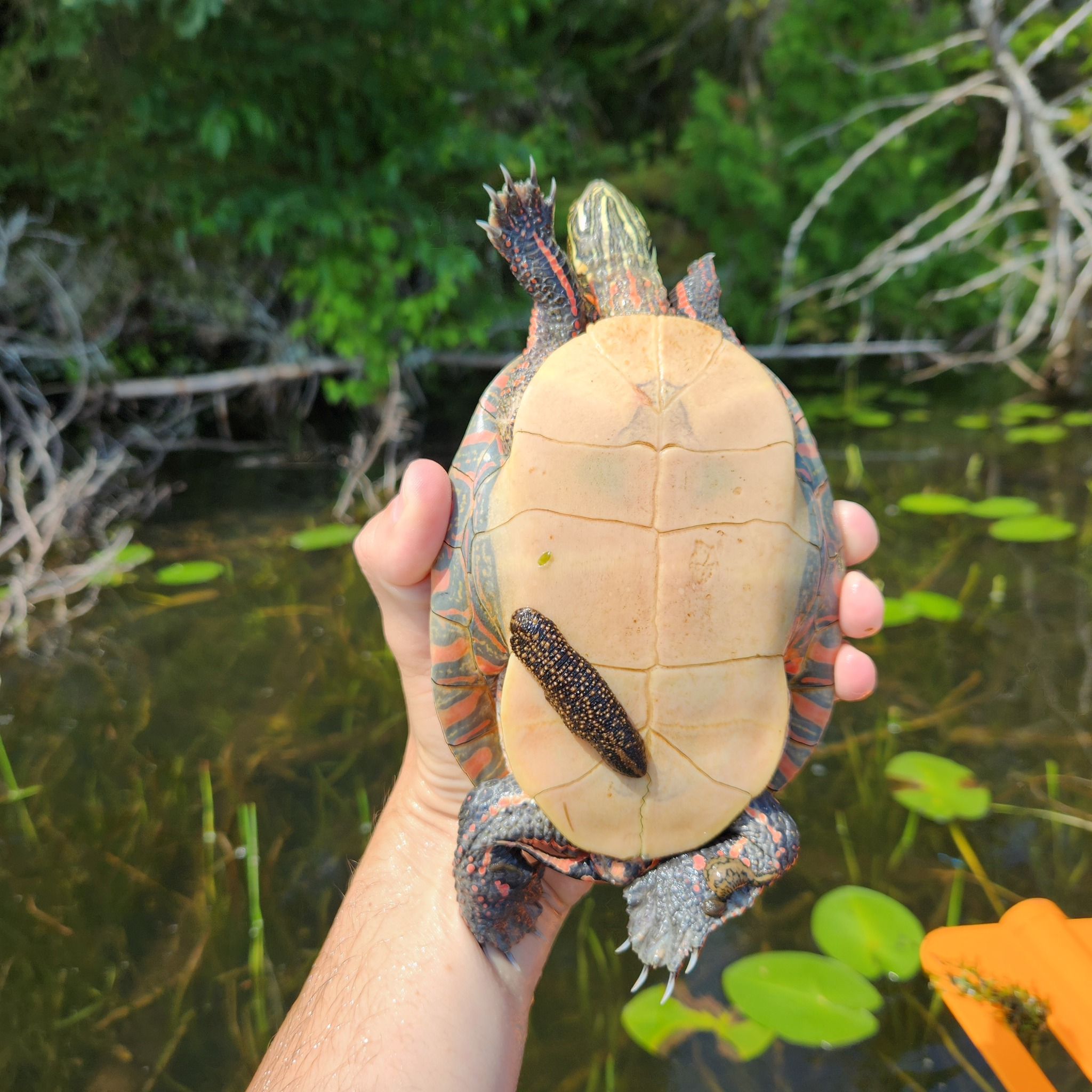
Placobdella parasitica on a turtle at Lake Simcoe, Ontario.

Placobdella parasitica is a species of leech found in North America. Leeches are habitual ectoparasites of vertebrates in aquatic environments. Placobdella parasitica is differentiated from other members of the genus Placobdella by its smooth dorsal surface, simple to complicated pigmentation, and abdomen with 8 to 12 stripes.
