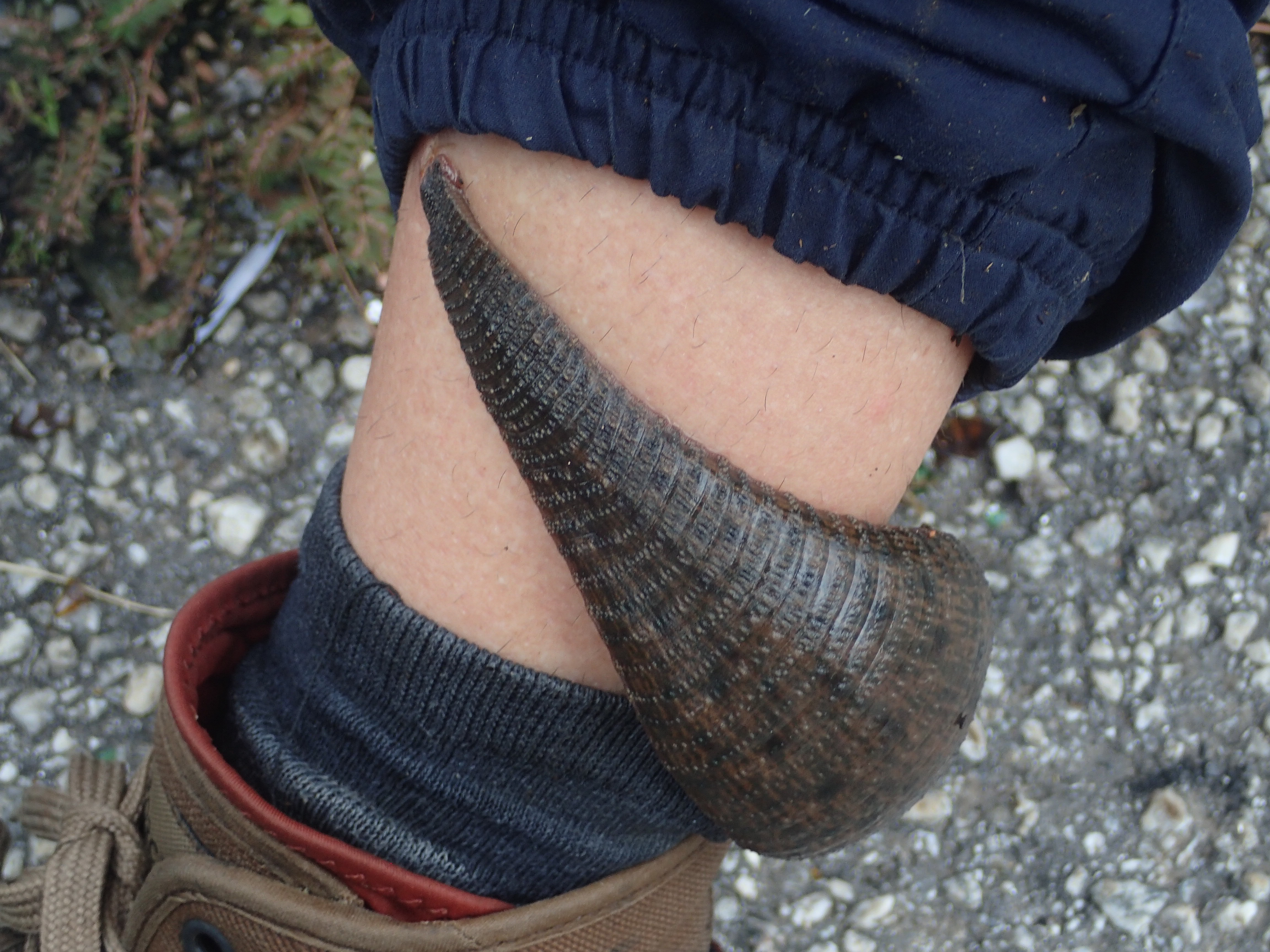

Scientific classification
- Kingdom: Animalia
- Phylum: Annelida
- Clade: Pleistoannelida
- Clade: Sedentaria
- Class: Clitellata
- Subclass: Hirudinea
- Order: Rhynchobdellida
- Family: Glossiphoniidae
- Genus: Haementeria
- Species: H. ghilianii

Binomial name
- Haementeria ghilianii de Filippi, 1849

= Haementeria ghilianii =

Giant Amazon leech

Haementeria ghilianii, commonly known as the Amazon giant leech, is one of the world's largest species of leeches.

== Taxonomy and discovery ==
Haementeria ghilianii is a species of leech in the Glossiphoniidae family, comprising freshwater proboscis-bearing leeches. Colloquially, they are known as the Amazon giant leech. Following its initial description in 1849, additional details were provided based on specimens from French Guiana in 1899, after which the species was largely forgotten for over 70 years.

=== Rediscovery and colonization ===
In the 1970s, Dr. Roy Sawyer discovered two adult specimens in a pond located in French Guiana. One of these leeches, dubbed Grandma Moses, founded a successful breeding colony at UC Berkeley. This specimen produced 750 offspring. Following Grandma Moses' death, the specimen was placed in the Smithsonian's National Invertebrate Collection.

== Description ==
Haementeria ghilianii is a jawless, blood-sucking leech. It can grow to 450 mm (17.7 in) in length and 100 mm (3.9 in) in width. This makes it the largest freshwater leech known. As adults, these leeches are a uniform greyish-brown color. Juveniles do not have a uniform color, but rather, a noncontinuous greyish-brown stripe and patches of color. The leeches form a "cobra hood" like shape that is widest in the center but tapers off on both ends. The wider end is where the proboscis is located, while the head is at the narrow end; H. ghilianii is made up 34 segments, each with its own ganglia.

=== Life cycle ===
This species is hermaphroditic; the male reproductive system is 3 g (0.0066 lb) to 5 g (0.011 lb) while the female reproductive system is 10 g (0.022 lb). Growth is irregular, as the leech's body weight increases by 3 to 6 fold times per feeding. Fecundity is based upon the weight of the leech during oviposition; egg clutches range from 60 to 500 eggs.

== Behavior and ecology ==
When stressed, leeches will produce mucus to evade predators.

=== Feeding ===
Unlike jawed leeches who use rows of teeth to puncture skin, Haementeria ghilianii uses a 10 centimetres (3.9 in) hypodermic needle-like proboscis to feed. Bites are kept open by the fibrinogenolytic (breaks up fibrinogen) enzyme hementin, which is secreted from the proboscis' lumen; secretion is neurologically controlled. Hementin dissolves clots within the proboscis by breaking up the fibrinogen links between individual platelets. Once attached to a host, they release anticoagulants to prevent clotting. Then, the leeches extract blood at a rate of up to 0.14 ml/min, consuming 15 ml of blood total. Blood is moved into the digestive system through a series of undulation movements, and leeches can go months without feeding. Observed host species include humans, rabbits, and cows. Claims from 1899 state that leeches could aggregate to the point of killing birds and cattle.

== Distribution ==
Haementeria ghilianii is endemic to the northern portions of the Amazon river, ranging from Venezuela to the Guianas.
