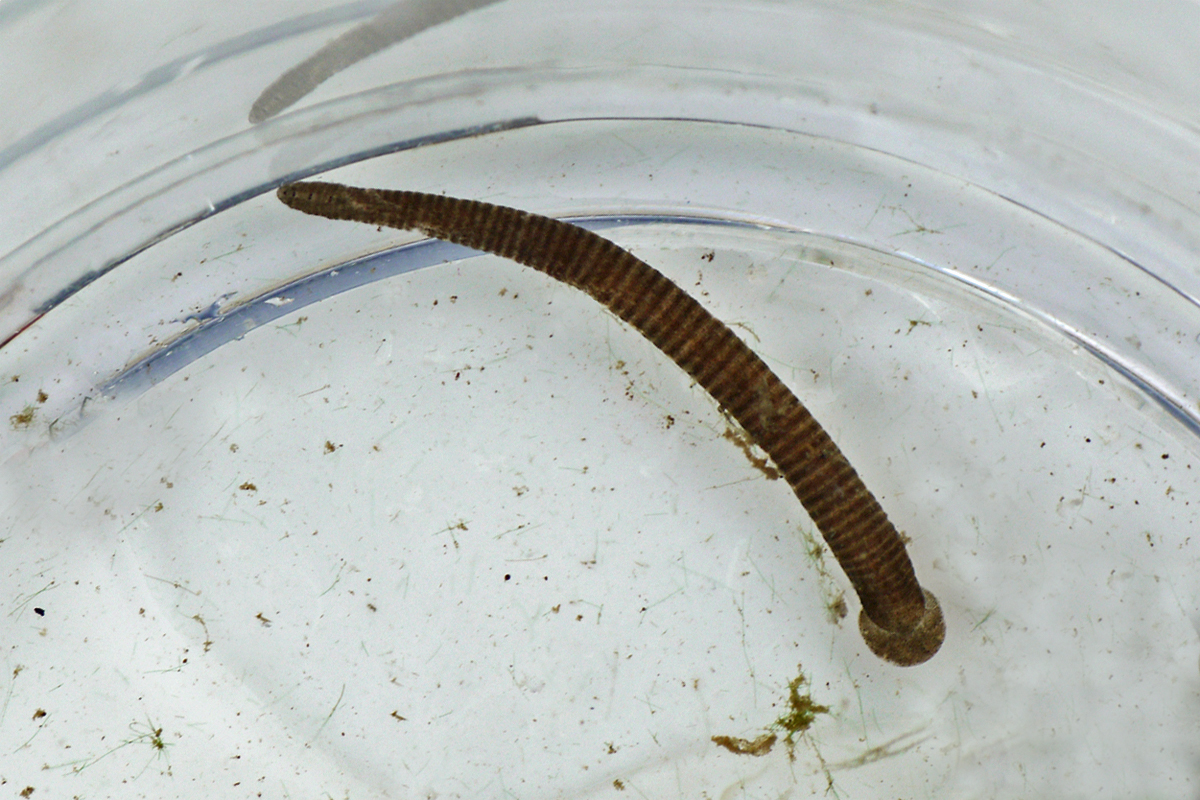

Conservation status
- Vulnerable (NatureServe)

Scientific classification
- Kingdom: Animalia
- Phylum: Annelida
- Clade: Pleistoannelida
- Clade: Sedentaria
- Class: Clitellata
- Subclass: Hirudinea
- Order: Rhynchobdellida
- Family: Glossiphoniidae
- Genus: Theromyzon
- Species: T. tessulatum

Binomial name
- Theromyzon tessulatum (O. F. Müller, 1774)

= Theromyzon tessulatum =

Species of annelid worm

Theromyzon tessulatum is a species of leech in the family Glossiphoniidae. It is a haematophagous (blood-sucking) leech, found in freshwater habitats in Europe.

== Description ==
The cuticle of T. tessulatum is transparent, olive green or brownish in colour, with larger individuals often exhibiting six longitudinal rows of small yellow spots. This leech is active and frequently changes shape, being up to 6 cm (2.4 in) long when extended. The posterior sucker is broad and conspicuous but the anterior sucker is small, and invisible when the animal is viewed from above.

== Distribution ==
This leech is found in freshwater habitats in Europe. It is common in the coastal flat parts of Holland which are visited by the waterfowl that act as its hosts. It is uncommon in Britain, where it has a discontinuous range, probably being distributed by movements of its bird hosts. It has also been recorded in North America from a number of locations.

== Ecology ==
When parasitizing ducks and other waterfowl, T. tessulatum invades their mouths and respiratory passages. At other times, it is free-living in freshwater habitats. The adult broods its egg capsules on its under surface, where there may be as many as two hundred eggs. When the young are ready to emerge, the adult uses its sensilla organs to detect vibrations in the water and will move towards any disturbance that might be caused by a potential host. Suitable hosts are those with body temperatures of between 37 and 40 °C (99 and 104 °F). Although generally nocturnal and negatively phototactic (avoiding light), when the brooding adult is ready to release its young, it may swim in open water in the middle of the day. If it finds a suitable host, it attaches itself with its sucker to the nasal passages, the respiratory tract or inside the mouth. This leech is unique in that the adult attaches to the host but does not itself feed on it; instead, the young that it was brooding transfer to the host to take their first blood meal.
