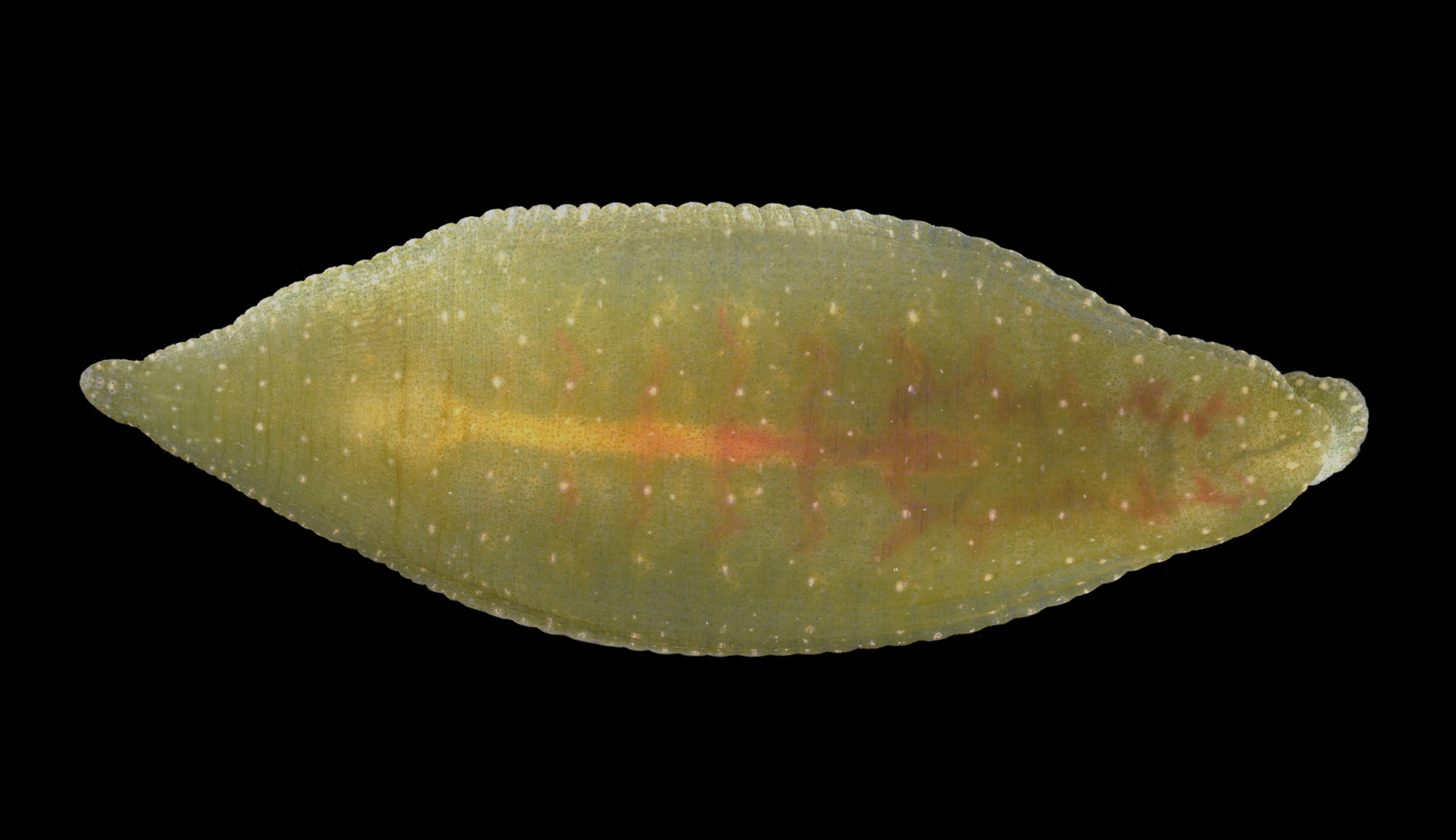

Scientific classification
- Kingdom: Animalia
- Phylum: Annelida
- Clade: Pleistoannelida
- Clade: Sedentaria
- Class: Clitellata
- Subclass: Hirudinea
- Order: Rhynchobdellida
- Family: Glossiphoniidae
- Genus: Theromyzon; Philippi, 1867

= Theromyzon =

Genus of leeches

Theromyzon is a genus of leeches belonging to the family Glossiphoniidae. There are about 14 described species in Theromyzon.

Leeches of this genus parasitize birds and are sometimes called duck leeches, although their hosts are not limited to ducks. The Theromyzon species tend to feed in the nasal cavities of waterbirds in general, from ducks to penguins.

As parasites of birds, and in many cases migratory waterfowl, these leeches typically have a broad distribution range. Leeches of the Theromyzon genus have been observed in the Americas, Eurasia, and Africa.

== Species ==
These 14 species belong to the genus Theromyzon:

- Theromyzon affinis Bennike, 1940
- Theromyzon bifarium Oosthuizen & Davies, 1993-01
- Theromyzon cooperi (Harding 1932)
- Theromyzon garjaewi (Livanow 1902)
- Theromyzon maculosum (Rathe, 1862)
- Theromyzon matthaii Bhatia 1939
- Theromyzon meyeri (Livanow, 1903)
- Theromyzon mollissimum Grube 1871
- Theromyzon pallens Philippi, 1867
- Theromyzon propinquum (Ringuelet 1947)
- Theromyzon rude (Baird, 1869)
- Theromyzon tessellatoides (Livanow 1902)
- Theromyzon tessulatum (O.F.Müller, 1774)
- Theromyzon trizonare Davies & Oosthuizen, 1993-01
