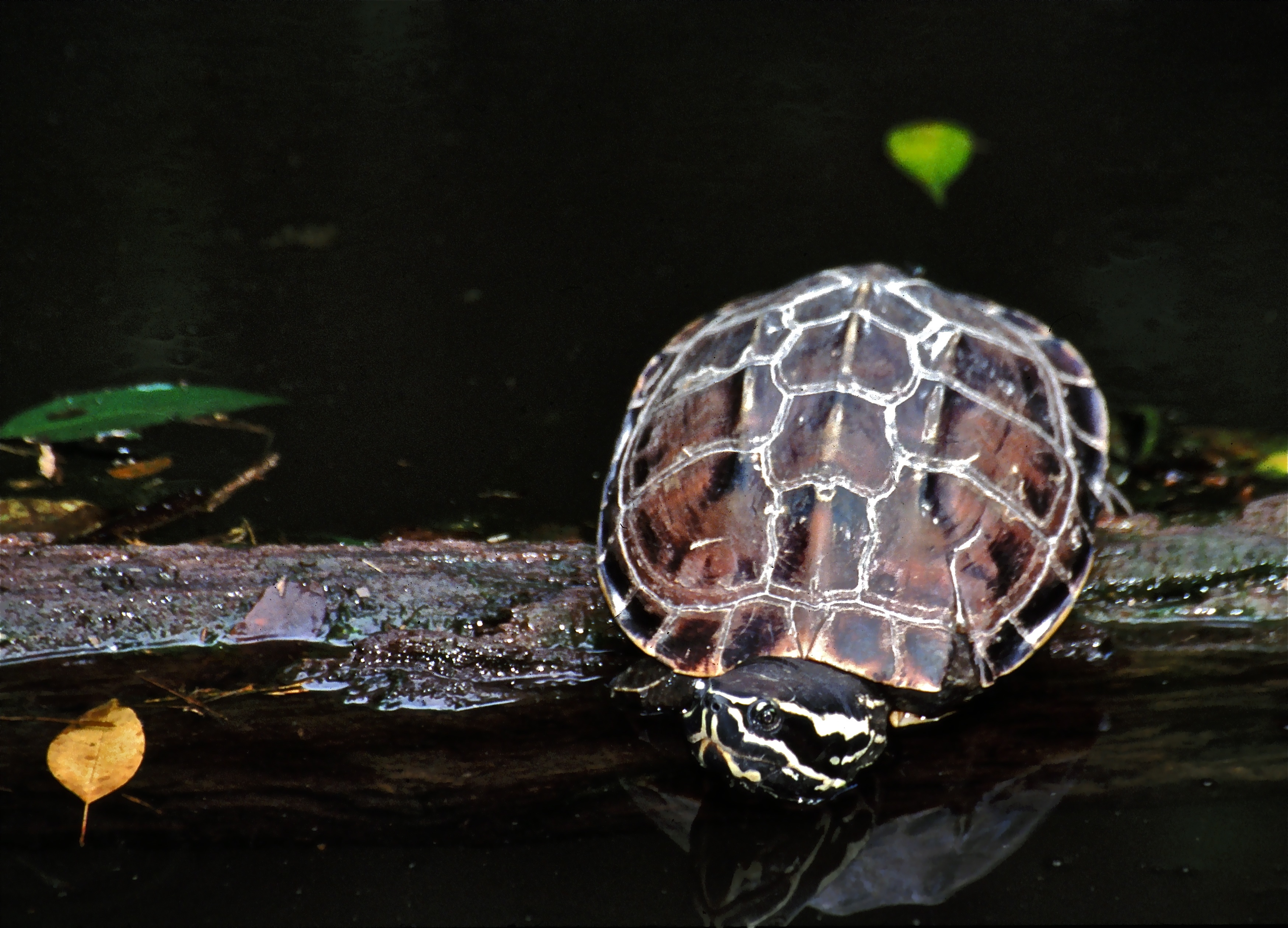

Conservation status
- Near Threatened (IUCN 3.1)
- CITES Appendix II

Scientific classification
- Kingdom: Animalia
- Phylum: Chordata
- Class: Reptilia
- Order: Testudines
- Suborder: Cryptodira
- Family: Geoemydidae
- Genus: Malayemys
- Species: M. subtrijuga

Binomial name
- Malayemys subtrijuga (Schlegel & Müller, 1845:30)

Synonyms
- Emys herrmanni Schweigger, 1812:311 nomen dubium; Emys subtrijuga Schlegel & Müller, 1845:30 nomen protectum; Emys nuchalis Blyth, 1863:82; Damonia crassiceps Gray, 1870:43; Damonia oblonga Gray, 1871:367

= Mekong snail-eating turtle =

Species of turtle

The Mekong snail-eating turtle (Malayemys subtrijuga) is a species of turtle in the family Geoemydidae. It was monotypic within the genus Malayemys until Brophy (2004, 2005) reevaluated (based on morphology) Malayemys macrocephala (Gray, 1859), which has been long time considered to be a synonym of M. subtrijuga.

== Distribution ==
The Mekong snail-eating turtle is found in the Mekong River basin of Cambodia, Laos, southern Vietnam, and Thailand and the northern Malay Peninsula, and Java, Indonesia. It could have been introduced to Java via human intervention from the Mekong River Basin. The occurrence of the species in Indonesia is regarded by Brophy (2005) to be allochthonous, i.e., non-native (Sumatra) or extinct (Java). The population of the Mekong snail-eating turtle is declining due to exploitation of the animal and their habitat.

== Predators ==
The Mekong snail-eating turtle is usually eaten by birds, fish, and larger turtles.
