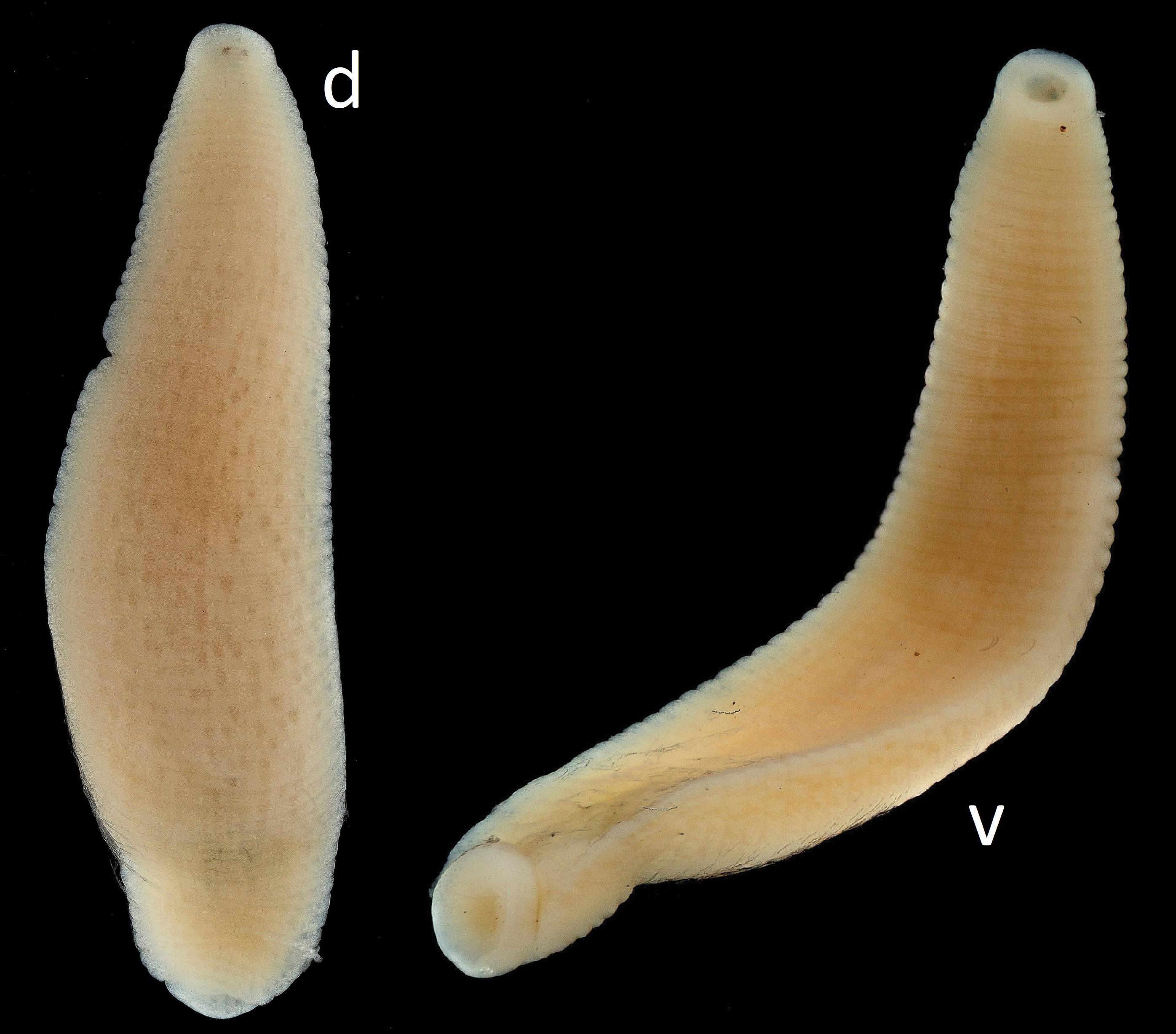
- Alboglossiphonia afroalpina

Scientific classification
- Kingdom: Animalia
- Phylum: Annelida
- Clade: Pleistoannelida
- Clade: Sedentaria
- Class: Clitellata
- Subclass: Hirudinea
- Order: Rhynchobdellida
- Family: Glossiphoniidae
- Genus: Alboglossiphonia; Lukin, 1976

= Alboglossiphonia =

Genus of annelid worms

Alboglossiphonia is a genus of Glossiphoniidae.

The genus was described in 1976 by E. I. Lukin.

It has cosmopolitan distribution.

Species:

- Alboglossiphonia australiensis (Goddard, 1908)
- Alboglossiphonia heteroclita (Linnaeus, 1761)
- Alboglossiphonia inflexa (Goddard, 1908)
- Alboglossiphonia intermedia (Goddard, 1909)
- Alboglossiphonia masoni (Mason, 1974)
- Alboglossiphonia multistriata (Mason, 1974)
- Alboglossiphonia tasmaniensis (Ingram, 1957)
