= Linta be =

Scientific classification
- Kingdom: Animalia
- Phylum: Annelida
- Clade: Pleistoannelida
- Clade: Sedentaria
- Class: Clitellata
- Subclass: Hirudinea
- Order: Arhynchobdellida
- Family: Salifidae
- Genus: Linta; Westergren & Siddall, 2004
- Species: L. be

Binomial name
- Linta be Westergren & Siddall, 2004

Species of leech

Linta be is a species of aquatic leech endemic to Madagascar. It is the only species in the monotypic genus Linta, described in 2004 by Stephanie Westergren and Mark Siddall. It is placed within the family Salifidae. The generic epithet Linta is derived from the Malagasy word linta, meaning aquatic leech. The specific epithet be is derived from the Malagasy language word be, meaning "great" or "very much", and was chosen "in light of this species being very much a leech and being found in large numbers notwithstanding that it had gone undiscovered for so long".

Linta be has pharyngeal stylets, which are characteristic of the family Salifidae, within the suborder Erpobdelliformes; however, it has 5 pairs of eyespots, similar to leeches of the suborder Hirudiniformes. Possession of characters of both suborders suggests that Linta be may be "a previously missing morphological link" connecting the lineages of the order Arhynchobdellida.
