= Ornatin =

Identifiers
- Symbol: Ornatin
- Pfam: PF02088
- InterPro: IPR002463
Available protein structures:
- PDB: IPR002463 PF02088 (ECOD; PDBsum)
- AlphaFold: IPR002463; PF02088

In molecular biology, ornatin is a potent glycoprotein IIb-IIIa (GP IIb-IIIa) antagonist and platelet aggregation inhibitor isolated from Placobdella ornata (Turtle leech). The protein is 41-52 amino acids in length and contains the RGD recognition motif common in adhesion proteins, and 6 conserved cysteine residues. These form three disulphide bonds, which are required for activity. The sequences of ornatin B, C, D and E are highly similar, while A2 and A3 are less similar, lacking the N-terminal 9 residues. Ornatins share ~40% identity with decorsin, a GP IIb-IIIa antagonist isolated from the leech Macrobdella decora.
