= Haementeria =

Scientific classification
- Kingdom: Animalia
- Phylum: Annelida
- Clade: Pleistoannelida
- Clade: Sedentaria
- Class: Clitellata
- Subclass: Hirudinea
- Order: Rhynchobdellida
- Family: Glossiphoniidae
- Genus: Haementeria de Filippi, 1849

Type species
- Haementeria ghilianii de Filippi, 1849

Genus of annelid worms

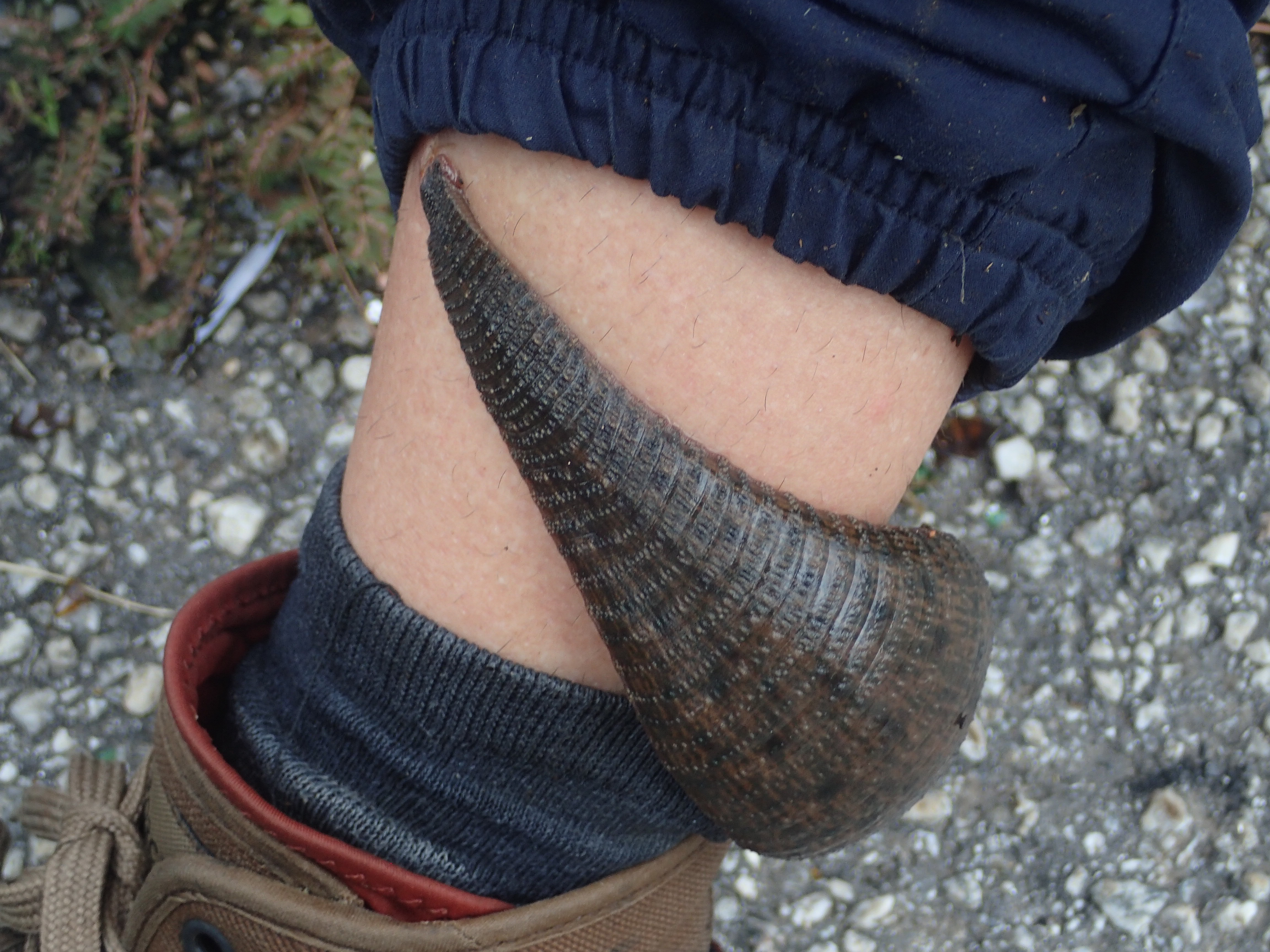
Haementeria ghilianii

Haementeria is a genus of leeches in the family Glossiphoniidae. The genus was described in 1849 by Filippo De Filippi.

It has been found in Europe and America.

== Species ==
Species include:

- Haementeria acuecueyetzin Oceguera-Figueroa, 2008
- Haementeria brasilensis (Cordero, 1937)
- Haementeria depressa Ringuelet, 1972
- Haementeria ghilianii de Filippi, 1849
- Haementeria lopezi Oceguera-Figueroa, 2006
- Haementeria lutzi Pinto, 1920
- Haementeria molesta (Cordero, 1934)
- Haementeria moorei Autrum, 1936
- Haementeria officinalis de Filippi, 1849
- Haementeria paraguayensis (Weber, 1915)
- Haementeria tuberculifera (Grube, 1871)
