= Linta (surname) =

Linta is a surname. The word originates from Old High German meaning "linden three and shield".

Notable people with the surname include:

- Aleksandar Linta (born 1975), Serbian football manager
- Ed Linta (born 1932), American football coach
- Miodrag Linta (born 1969), Serbian politician and activist
- Nina Linta Lazarević (born 1976), Serbian actress
