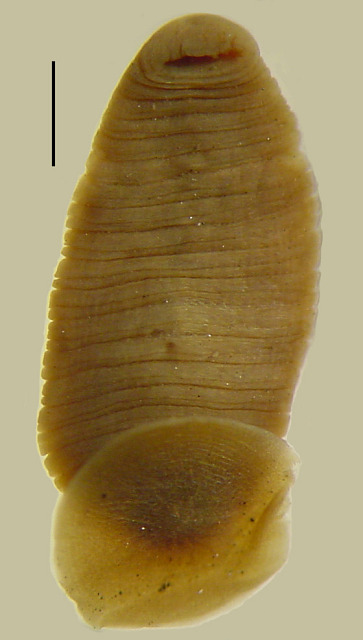
- Torix cotylifer, the scale bar is equal to 1 millimetre (0.039 in)

Scientific classification
- Kingdom: Animalia
- Phylum: Annelida
- Clade: Pleistoannelida
- Clade: Sedentaria
- Class: Clitellata
- Subclass: Hirudinea
- Order: Rhynchobdellida
- Family: Glossiphoniidae
- Genus: Torix; Blanchard, 1893

Type species
- Torix mirus Blanchard, 1893

Species
- See text

Synonyms
- Oligoclepsis Oka, 1935

= Torix (annelid) =

Genus of leech

Torix is a genus of Rhynchobdellid leeches in the family Glossiphoniidae, found in Eastern Asia and Japan. Rana japonica, the Japanese brown frog, is the main host of T. tagoi.

== Rickettsia bacterial infection ==
Two members of the genus, T. tagoi and T. tukubana, show high percentages of Rickettsia infection in the wild; 96% and 83% respectively, according to a 2003 study. Eggs of T. tagoi were found to all contain the bacteria, indicating the bacteria is almost always passed on to the next generation (vertical transmission). It was found that infected leeches grew far larger than those uninfected with the bacteria. Another paper concluded that the Rickettsia that acted as endosymbionts in the leeches represented a separate clade of Rickettsia, named the torix clade. As T. tagoi feeds on the blood of amphibians such as frogs and newts, it is possible that those amphibians were the route of horizontal transmission.

== Species ==
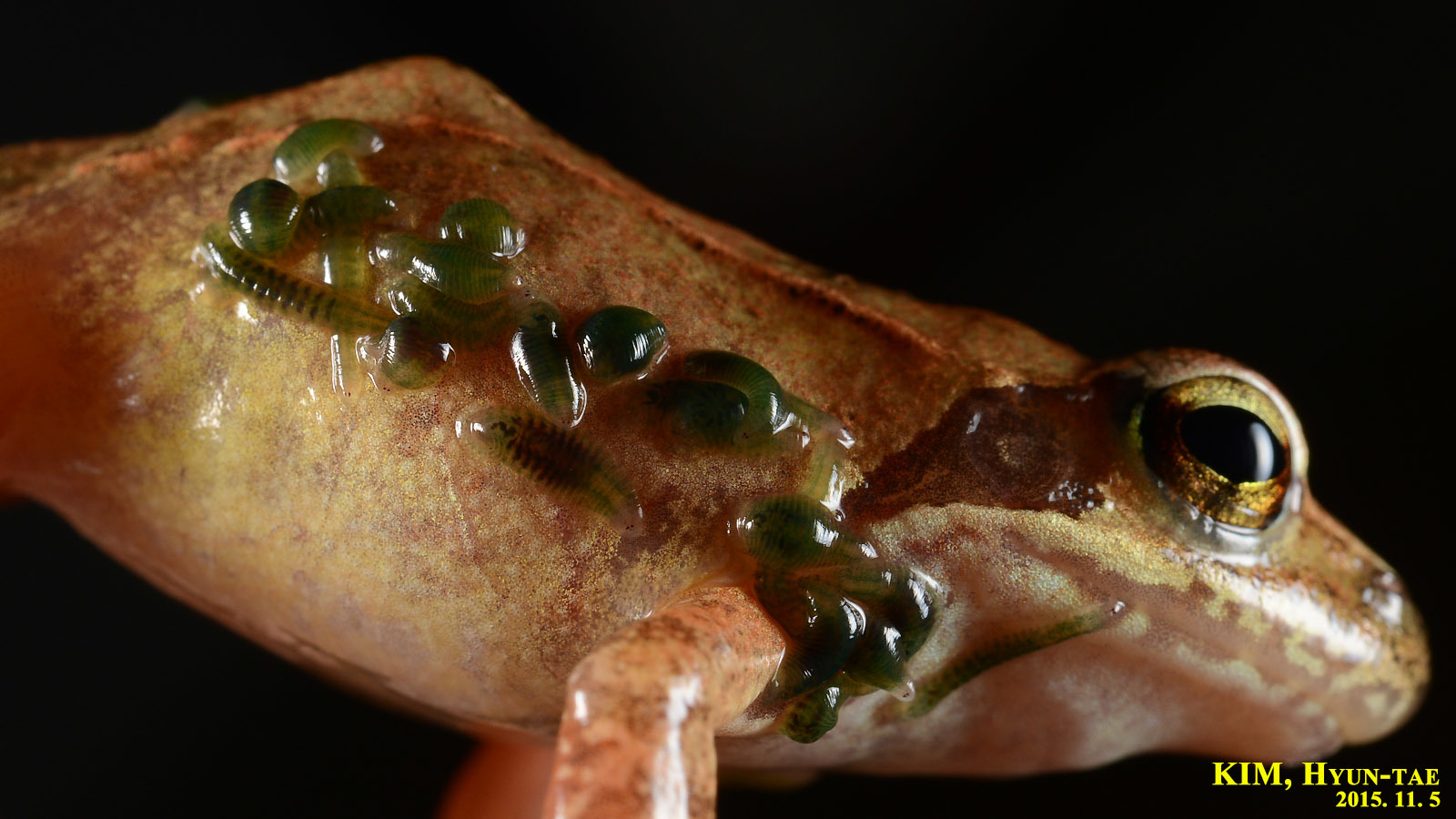
Photo of a leech, probably a member of the genus Torix, on a frog of the Rana genus uploaded from iNaturalist.

The number of species the genus contains is somewhat disputed between taxonomic databases and scientific papers.

- Torix cotylifer Blanchard, 1898
- Torix mirus Blanchard, 1893
- Torix novazealandiae (Dendy & Olliver, 1900)
- Torix orientalis (Oka, 1925)
- Torix tagoi (Oka, 1925)
- Torix tukubana (Oka, 1935)

Torix baicalensis was moved to the genus Glossiphonia.
