= Hementin =

Anticoagulant enzyme

Hementin is an anticoagulant protease (fibrinogen lytic enzyme) from the salivary glands of the giant Amazon leech (Haementeria ghilianii). Hementin is a calcium-dependent protease with a molecular weight of 80–120 kDa, and it contains 39 amino acid sequences. Hementin is present in both the anterior and posterior salivary glands, however it is mostly produced from certain cells in the anterior glands. The secretion of hementin is limited to the lumen of the proboscis, which the Amazon leech inserts into the host to suck blood. Hementin dissolves platelet-rich blood clots and lets the blood flow through the proboscis. Hementin is able to dissolve a type of blood clots that cannot be dissolved by other compounds, such as streptokinase and urokinase.

The processes of blood anticoagulation by hementin includes the degradation of fibrinogen. It is capable of disrupting the function of fibrinogen, a glycoprotein responsible for blood clotting, by cleaving three peptide bonds in its structure. Hementin is also capable of segregating platelets by cleaving the fibrinogen cross-link amongst the platelets. Fibrinogen acts as a substrate for thrombin, which converts this protein into its functional form, fibrin. Cleavage of fibrinogen in its native conformation at AαAsn102-Asn103, BβLys130-Gln131, and ϓPro76-Asn77 yield three sets of products. Hementin may also cause platelet deaggregation, although not under all circumstances. Because of its anticoagulant effects, Hementin can be described as a hemostatic regulator.
