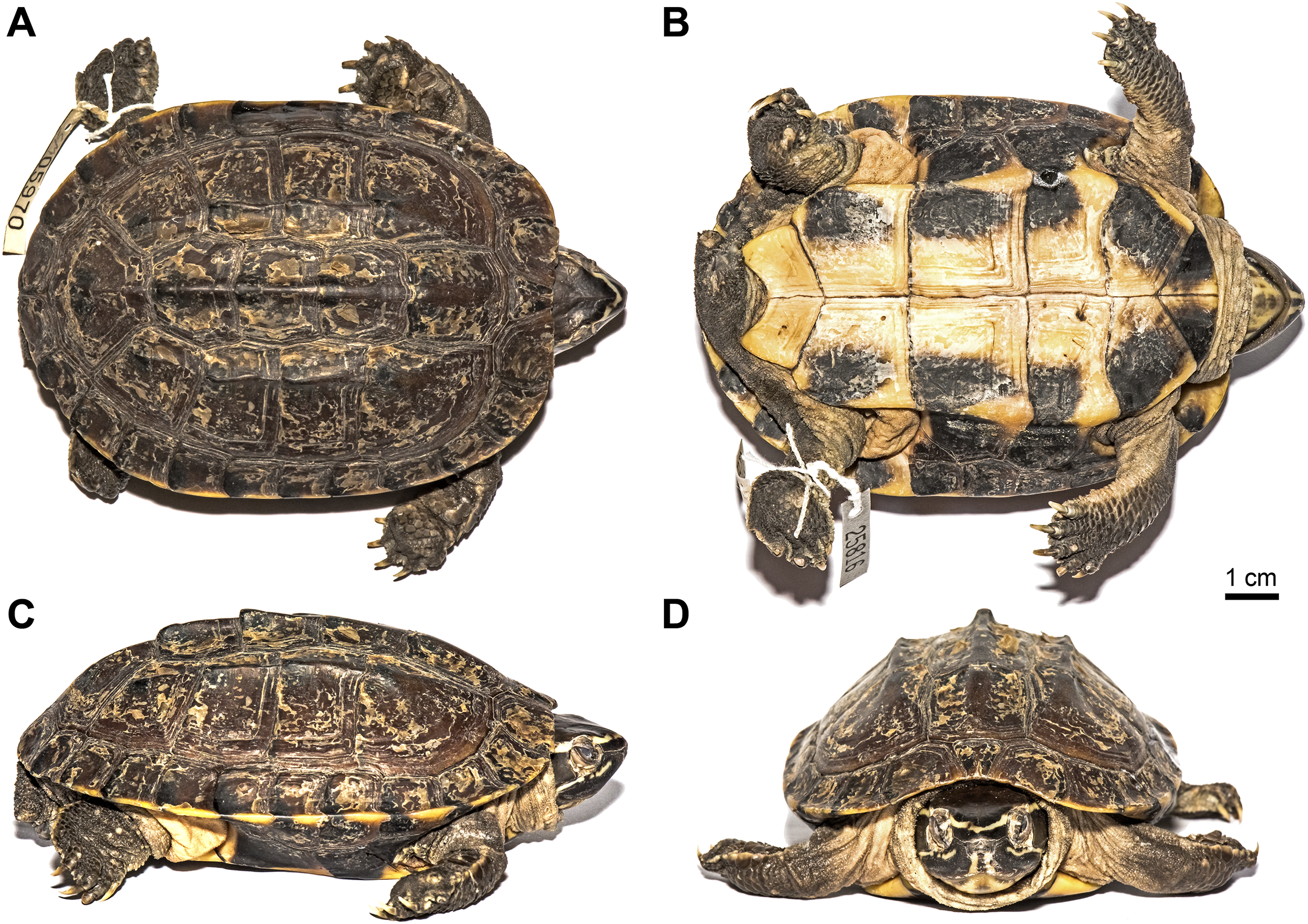

Conservation status
- CITES Appendix II

Scientific classification
- Kingdom: Animalia
- Phylum: Chordata
- Class: Reptilia
- Order: Testudines
- Suborder: Cryptodira
- Family: Geoemydidae
- Genus: Malayemys
- Species: M. khoratensis

Binomial name
- Malayemys khoratensis Ihlow, et al. 2016

Synonyms
- Malayemys isan Somontha et al., 2017

= Khorat snail-eating turtle =

Species of turtle

The Khorat snail-eating turtle (Malayemys khoratensis) is a species of turtle in the family Geoemydidae. They are freshwater turtles from Khorat Plateau in Thailand (hence where they get their name from) but were found for the first time in Udon Thani, Thailand.

They are predominantly found in the Chi River Basin and upper Mun River Basin to the Mekong River.
