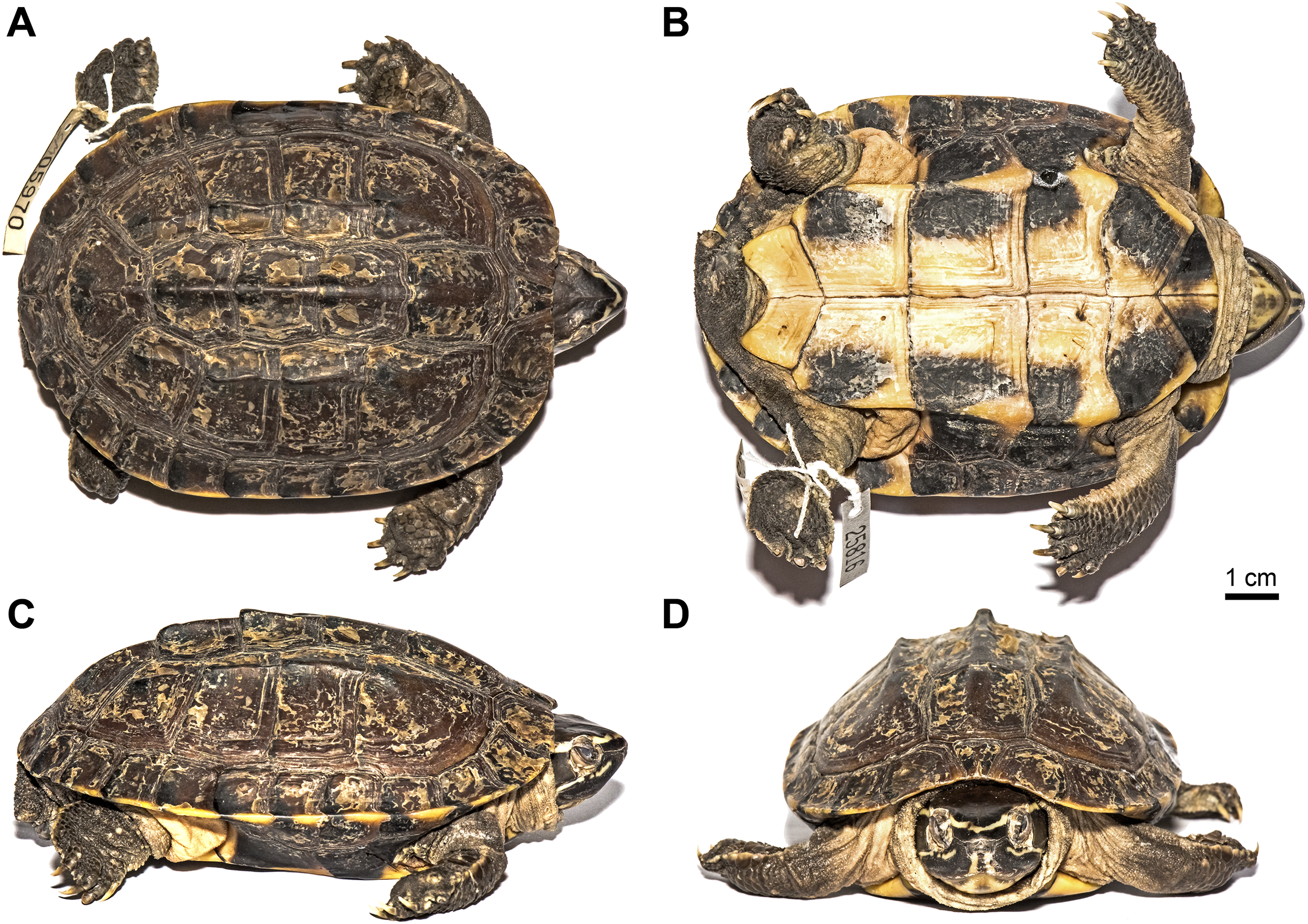
- The holotype of Malayemys khoratensis
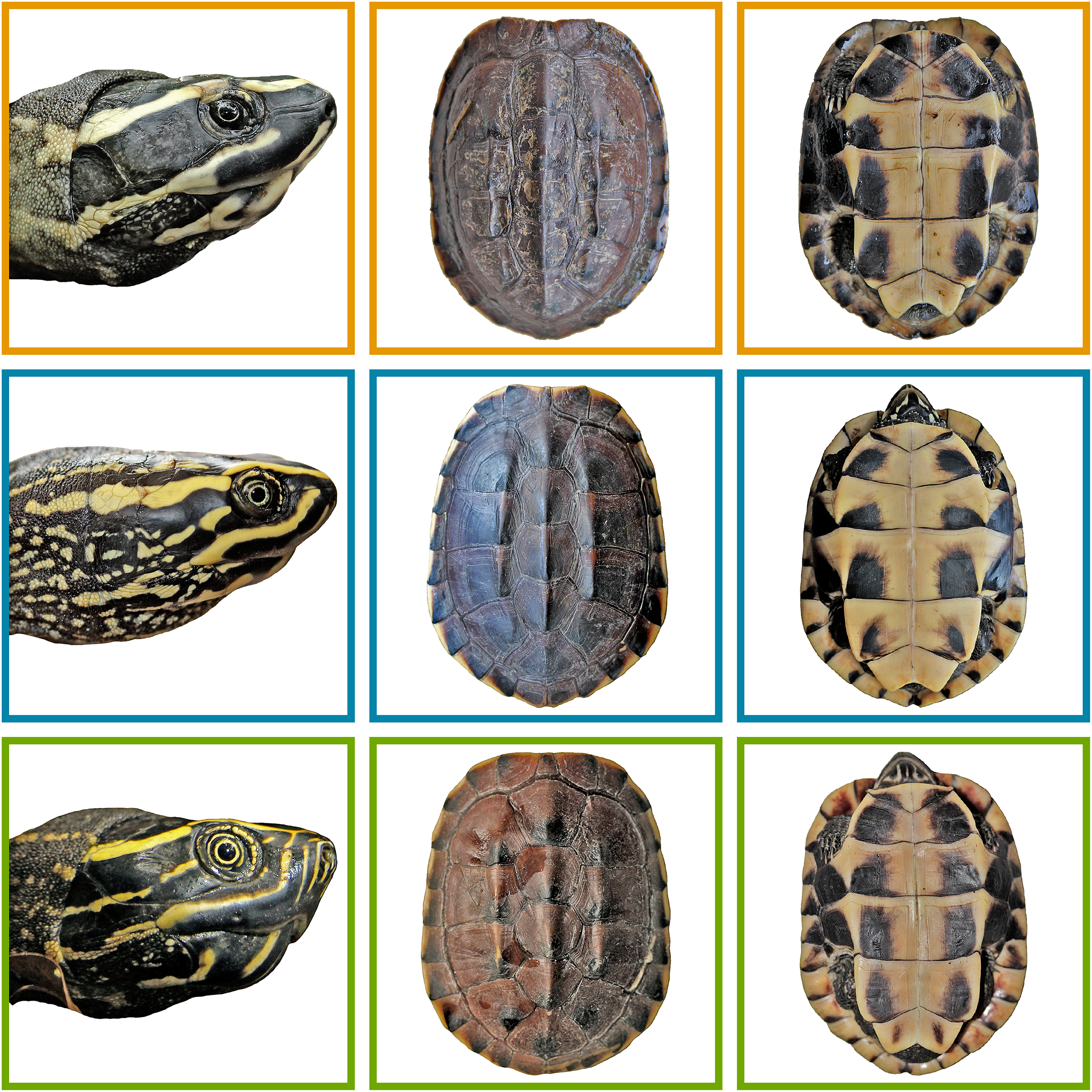
- Morphological differences in shell characteristics and head colouration patterns of Malayemys khoratensis (orange), Malayemys macrocephala (blue), Malayemys subtrijuga (green).

Scientific classification
- Kingdom: Animalia
- Phylum: Chordata
- Class: Reptilia
- Order: Testudines
- Suborder: Cryptodira
- Family: Geoemydidae
- Subfamily: Geoemydinae
- Genus: Malayemys; Lindholm, 1931

Synonyms
- Damonia; Malayameys

= Malayemys =

Genus of turtles

Malayemys is a genus of turtles in the family Geoemydidae. It was considered monotypic until 2005 It is found in several countries of Southeast Asia.

== Taxonomy ==
The genus description is attributed to Wassili Adolfovitch Lindholm in 1931. Damonia was used by John Edward Gray in 1869, but is considered a junior homonym. It was considered monotypic until 2004. As of 2016, the genus consists of three species: Malayemys macrocephala, Malayemys subtrijuga and Malayemys khoratensis. The name Malayemys isan has been demonstrated to have not been published until after the name M. khoratensis if it was published under the code at all.

The genus consists of three species.

- Malayemys macrocephala
- Malayemys subtrijuga
- Malayemys khoratensis

== Distribution ==
Malayemys has a native distribution in Cambodia, Laos, Malaysia, Thailand, and Vietnam, and was introduced into Java, Indonesia.
