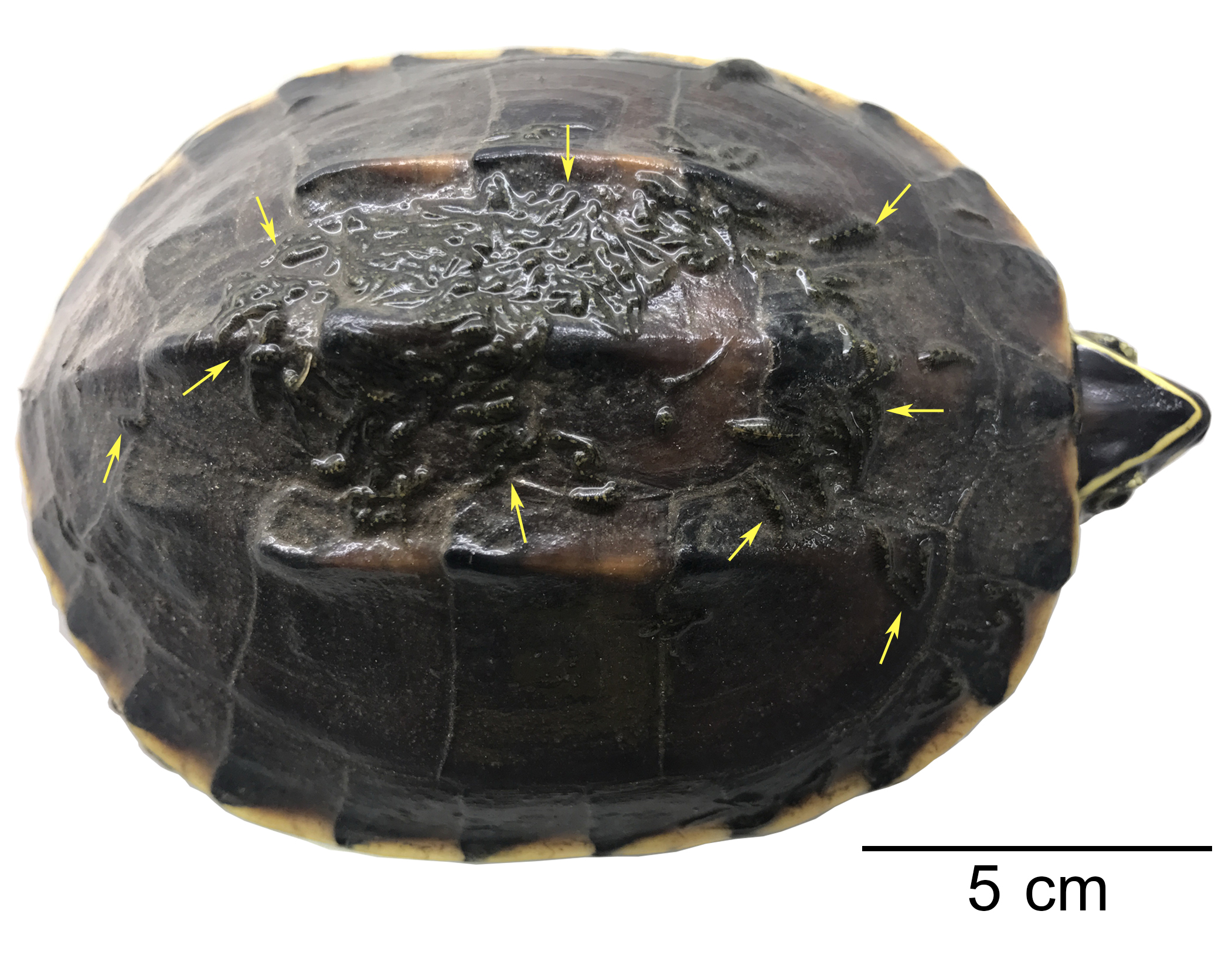
- With Placobdelloides siamensis leeches

Conservation status
- Least Concern (IUCN 3.1)
- CITES Appendix II (CITES)

Scientific classification
- Kingdom: Animalia
- Phylum: Chordata
- Class: Reptilia
- Order: Testudines
- Suborder: Cryptodira
- Family: Geoemydidae
- Genus: Malayemys
- Species: M. macrocephala

Binomial name
- Malayemys macrocephala (Gray, 1859)

Synonyms
- Geoclemmys macrocephala Gray, 1859; Clemmys macrocephala Strauch, 1862; Emys macrocephala Günther, 1864; Damonia macrocephala Gray, 1869; Geoclemys macrocephala Bourret, 1941; Malayemys macrocephala Brophy, 2004

= Malayan snail-eating turtle =

Species of turtle

The Malayan snail-eating turtle (Malayemys macrocephala) is a species of turtle in Malayemys genus of the family Geoemydidae.

== Distribution ==
The Malayan snail-eating turtle is found in the Cambodia, Myanmar, west Malaysia and Thailand (coastal southeastern and central of Chao Phraya and Mae Klong basins).

== Description ==
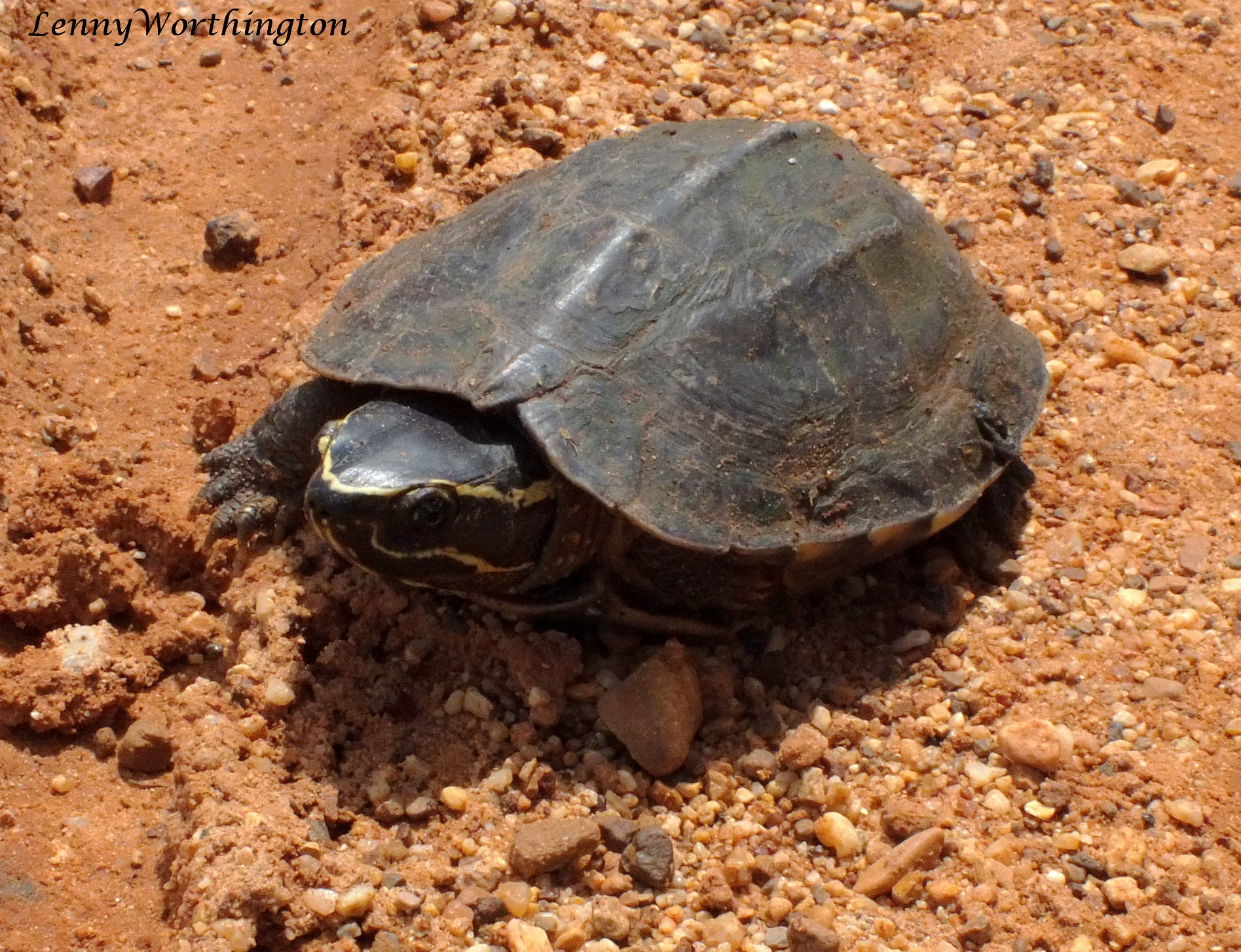
Malayan snail-eating turtle

The Malayan snail-eating turtle has the basic freshwater turtle characteristics to represent an animal model when it comes to developmental biology. Females grow to have prominently larger heads than males. Those with large heads and other particular functions are fitted to diets including predominantly molluscs.

== Bibliography ==
- Rhodin, Anders G.J.; van Dijk, Peter Paul; Iverson, John B.; Shaffer, H. Bradley; Roger, Bour (2011-12-31). "Turtles of the world, 2011 update: Annotated checklist of taxonomy, synonymy, distribution and conservation status" (PDF). Chelonian Research Monographs. 5. Archived from the original (PDF) on 2012-01-31.
- Fritz, Uwe; Havaš, Peter (2007-10-31). "Checklist of Chelonians of the World" (PDF). Archived from the original (PDF) on 2011-05-01.
- Malayemys macrocephala, The Reptile Database
- Kitana, J., Kitana, N., & Pewphong, R. (2020). Chronology of Gonadal Development in the Malayan Snail-eating Turtle Malayemys macrocephala. Zoological Studies, 59(20).
- Dawson, E.J., Ihlow, F., Ettmar, S., Paul van Dijk, P. (2018). Malayemys macrocephala (Gray 1859) – Malayan Snail-Eating Turtle, Rice-Field Terrapin. Conservation Biology of Freshwater Turtles and Tortoises: A Compilation Project of the IUCN/SSC Tortoise and Freshwater Turtle Specialist Group. Chelonian Research Foundation and Turtle Conservancy. 10.3854/crm.5.108.macrocephala.v1.2018
