= Mark Siddall =

Canadian biologist

Mark E. Siddall is a Canadian biologist and former curator at the American Museum of Natural History. Siddall has studied the evolution and systematics of blood parasites and leeches, and systematic theory. Siddall was hired as an assistant curator at the American Museum of Natural History in July, 1999 and worked there as a curator until September, 2020, when he was terminated for allegedly having violated the museum's policy prohibiting sexual relationships between staff and mentees. Siddall denied the claim.

== Education ==
Siddall completed a Masters and PhD under the supervision of Sherwin S. Desser at the University of Toronto in 1991 and 1994, respectively.

== Career ==
After completing his PhD, Siddall completed a postdoc at the Virginia Institute of Marine Science. Subsequently, he was a fellow in the Michigan Society of Fellows from 1996-1999. He also acted as treasurer of the Willi Hennig Society, publisher of the journal Cladistics.

Siddall has worked and published on parasitic and other animals, including leeches, jellyfish, guinea worms, and bed bugs.

He is author of the science book Poison: Sinister Species with Deadly Consequences.

In 2016, Siddall, Jonathan Eisen, and others were involved in the Twitter controversy #ParsimonyGate.

The American Museum of Natural History fired Siddall in September 2020 for alleged sexual harassment, citing museum policy that prohibits sexual relationships between staff and mentees under their academic supervision. An outside law firm representing the museum's interests found that Siddall had "engaged in verbal, written, and physical conduct of a sexual nature that had the effect of unreasonably interfering with your academic performance." Siddall denied that any sexual encounter ever took place, and claimed he was fired because "he had found a serious error" in a paper.

== Research ==
Siddall studies phylogenetics and evolution. Siddall has been described as "a staunch supporter of parsimony and a harsh critic of maximum likelihood approaches”, although "having mellowed a bit on that".
