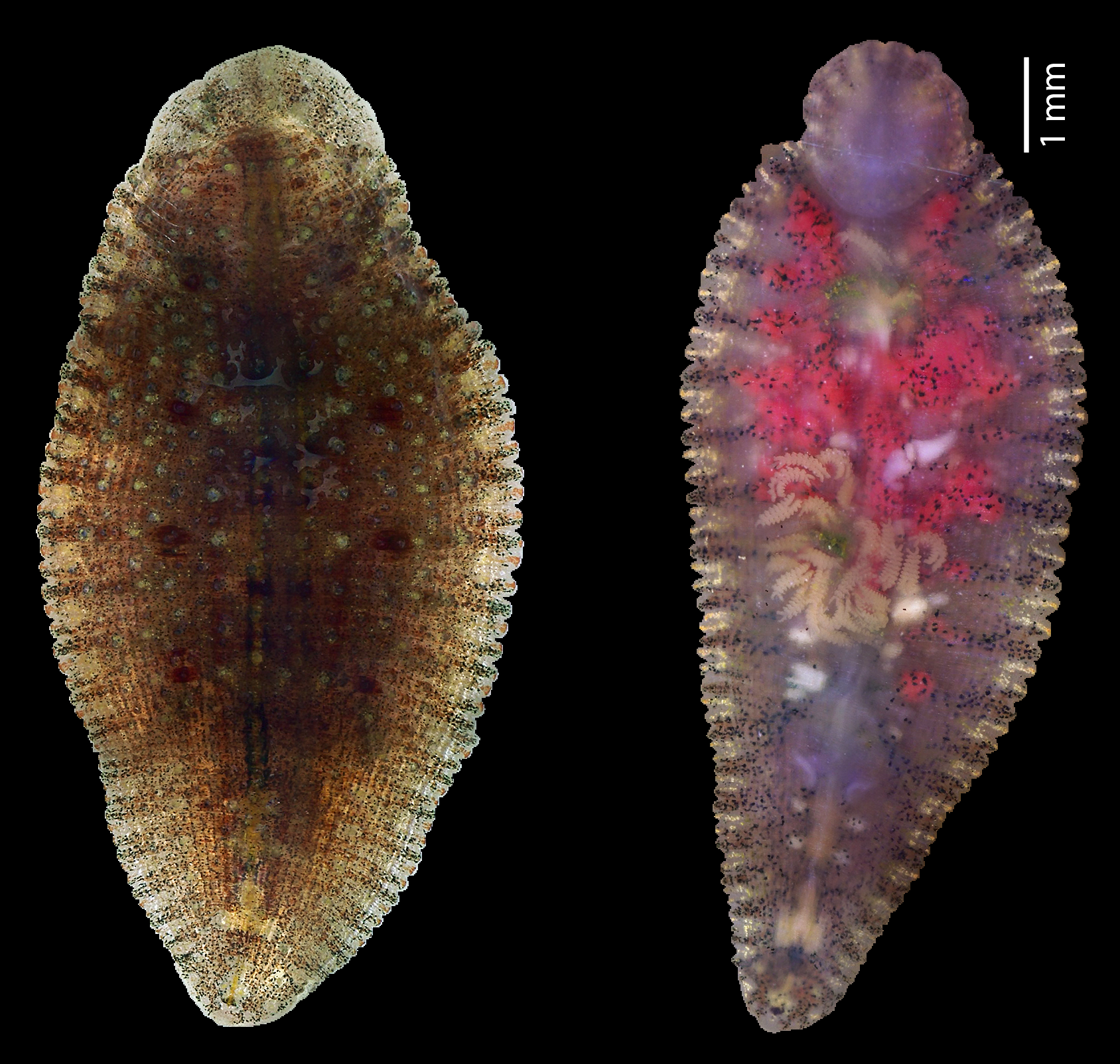
- Placobdelloides siamensis

Scientific classification
- Kingdom: Animalia
- Phylum: Annelida
- Clade: Pleistoannelida
- Clade: Sedentaria
- Class: Clitellata
- Subclass: Hirudinea
- Order: Rhynchobdellida
- Family: Glossiphoniidae; Vaillant, 1890

Subfamilies
- Glossiphoniinae; Haementeriinae; Theromyzinae and see text

= Glossiphoniidae =

Family of annelid worms

Glossiphoniidae are a family of freshwater proboscis-bearing leeches. These leeches are generally flattened, and have a poorly defined anterior sucker. Most suck the blood of freshwater vertebrates like amphibians, crocodilians and aquatic turtles, but some feed on invertebrates like oligochaetes and freshwater snails instead. Although they prefer other hosts, blood-feeding species will opportunistically feed from humans.

There is considerable interest in the symbiotic bacteria that at least some glossiphoniids house in specialized organs called bacteriomes. The bacteria are thought to provide the leeches with nutrients that are scarce or absent from their regular diets. Haementeria as well as Placobdelloides have Enterobacteriaceae symbionts, while Placobdella harbours peculiar and independently derived alphaproteobacteria.

== Systematics and taxonomy ==
The relationships between members of Glossiphoniidae are not completely understood. Some sources divide the group into three subfamilies, while many divide the family directly into genera. Genera are listed below, with subfamily given in brackets.

- Actinobdella Moore, 1901 (Subfamily Haementariinae)
- Alboglossiphonia Lukin, 1976 (Subfamily Haementariinae)
- Desserobdella Barta & Sawyer, 1990 (Subfamily Glossiphoniinae)
- Gloiobdella Ringuelet, 1978 (Subfamily Haementariinae)
- Glossiphonia Johnson, 1817 (Subfamily Glossiphoniinae)
- Haementaria de Filippi, 1849 (Subfamily Haementariinae)
- Helobdella Blanchard, 1896 (Subfamily Haementariinae)
- Marvinmeyeria Soós, 1969 (Subfamily Haementariinae)
- Oligobdella Moore, 1918 (Subfamily Haementariinae)
- Placobdella Blanchard, 1893 (Subfamily Glossiphoniinae)
- Placobdelloides Sawyer, 1986
- Theromyzon Philippi, 1867 (Subfamily Theromyzinae)
- Torix Blanchard, 1893

Genera listed are based on consensus between the Encyclopedia of Life, the Catalogue of Life, and the University of Michigan's Animal Diversity Web. Other sources, however, such as GBIF or ITIS, give more or fewer genera.

== Ecology and behavior ==
Glossiphoniid leeches exhibit remarkable parental care, the most highly developed one among the known annelids. They produce a membranous bag to hold the eggs, which is carried on the underside. The young attach to the parent's belly after hatching and are thus ferried to their first meal.

Certain Glossiphoniidae parasitize amphibian species. For example, some members of the Glossiphoniidae are known to attack the inner oral cavity of the Rough-skinned Newt.

== Medical importance ==
While glossiphoniids do not preferentially feed on humans, they are nonetheless of medical interest. As with all blood- or haemolymph-feeding leeches, their saliva contains anticoagulant compounds which are potentially useful in therapy of some cardiovascular diseases. Antistasin and related inhibitors of thrombokinase a such as ghilanten, lefaxin and therostatin have been derived from Haementeria species and Theromyzon tessulatum. These substances also may prevent certain tumors from metastasizing. Also from Haementeria are the fibrin stabilizing factor a inhibitor tridegin, a platelet adhesion inhibitor (leech anti-platelet protein; LAPP), and the fibrinogen-dissolving enzymes hementin and hementerin. T. tessulatum also yields therin, theromin and tessulin, which inhibit protease activity. Ornatins, which are antiplatelet glycoprotein IIb-IIIa antagonists, were discovered in Placobdella ornata, and several species have yielded hyaluronidases.
