= Branchellion ravenelii =

Scientific classification
- Kingdom: Animalia
- Phylum: Annelida
- Clade: Pleistoannelida
- Clade: Sedentaria
- Class: Clitellata
- Subclass: Hirudinea
- Order: Rhynchobdellida
- Family: Piscicolidae
- Genus: Branchellion
- Species: B. ravenelii

Binomial name
- Branchellion ravenelii Girard, 1850

Species of marine leech

Branchellion ravenelii is a species of marine leech in the genus Branchellion. Originally identified by Girard in 1850, the species is often found on rays and skates. B. ravenelii has been found in warm water in the southeastern United States and Gulf of Mexico.

== Description ==
Branchellion ravenelii appears similar to B. torpedinis, though the number of branchiae pairs differs between the two, with B. ravenelii having 31 pairs, whereas B. torpedinis has 33 pairs.

== Habitat ==
Branchellion ravenelii has been found in warm water in the southeastern United States and Gulf of Mexico. In the wild, hosts commonly reside in the Gulf of Mexico, though B. ravenelii has also been identified in the Atlantic Ocean near Charleston, South Carolina, as well as on both coasts of Florida and in Mississippi.

The species is typically found in water with high salinity (over 30 parts per thousand) and temperature between 19°C and 28°C.

== Hosts ==
Branchellion ravenelii has been found on the following hosts: Aetobatus narinari, Amphotistius sabinus, Dasyatis americana, D. hastata, D. sabina, D. sayi, Gymnura micrura, Narcine bmsiliensis, and Raja eglanteria.
