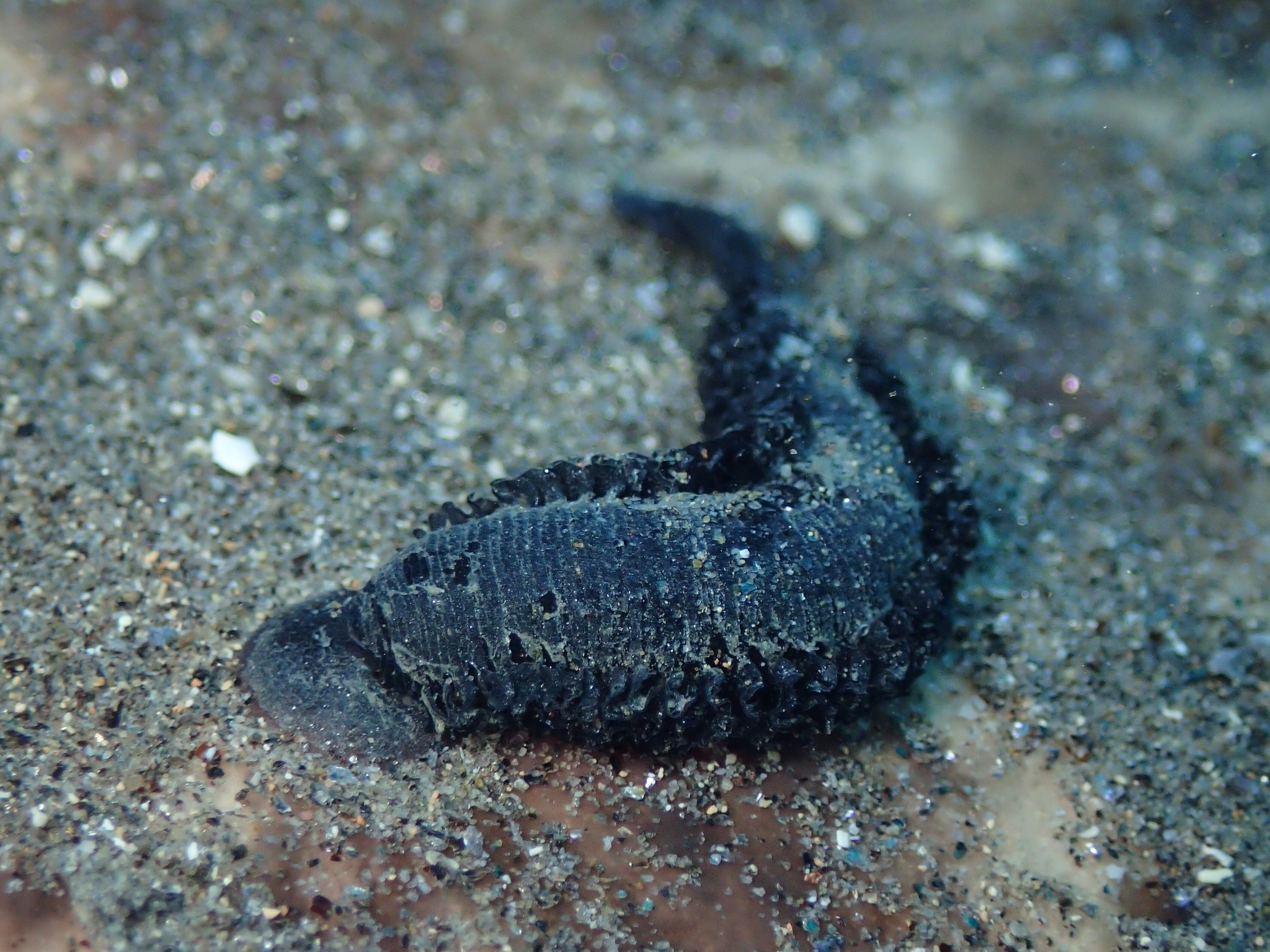
- Branchellion torpedinis photographed in Granada in 2019.

Scientific classification
- Kingdom: Animalia
- Phylum: Annelida
- Clade: Pleistoannelida
- Clade: Sedentaria
- Class: Clitellata
- Subclass: Hirudinea
- Order: Rhynchobdellida
- Family: Piscicolidae
- Genus: Branchellion
- Species: B. torpedinis

Binomial name
- Branchellion torpedinis Savigny, 1822

= Branchellion torpedinis =

Species of leech

Branchellion torpedinis is a species of marine leech found in the North Atlantic Ocean and the Mediterranean Sea. A permanent and exclusive parasite of elasmobranchs, B. torpedinis was first described in 1822 from the eastern Mediterranean.

== Classification ==
Branchellion torpedinis was first described in 1822 by Jules-César Savigny from the eastern Mediterranean. Its specific epithet, torpedinis, refers to its hosts, which include the electric rays, or Torpedo. The genus Branchellion, which B. torpedinis is the type species, was erected in the same work. The leeches are classified in the family Piscicolidae, jawless parasites of saltwater fish. In 2023, a new species of Branchellion, dubbed B. brevicaudatae, was discovered from Japan, parasitizing the short-tail stingray. A maximum-likelihood phylogenetic analysis based on genetic information found that the new species was the sister taxon to B. torpedinis.

Cladogram of species related to Branchellion torpedinis

- - B. lobata
  - - B. parkeri
    - Branchellion sp.
- - B. torpedinis
  - B. brevicaudatae

After a phylogenetic tree by Jimi et al., 2023.

== Distribution ==
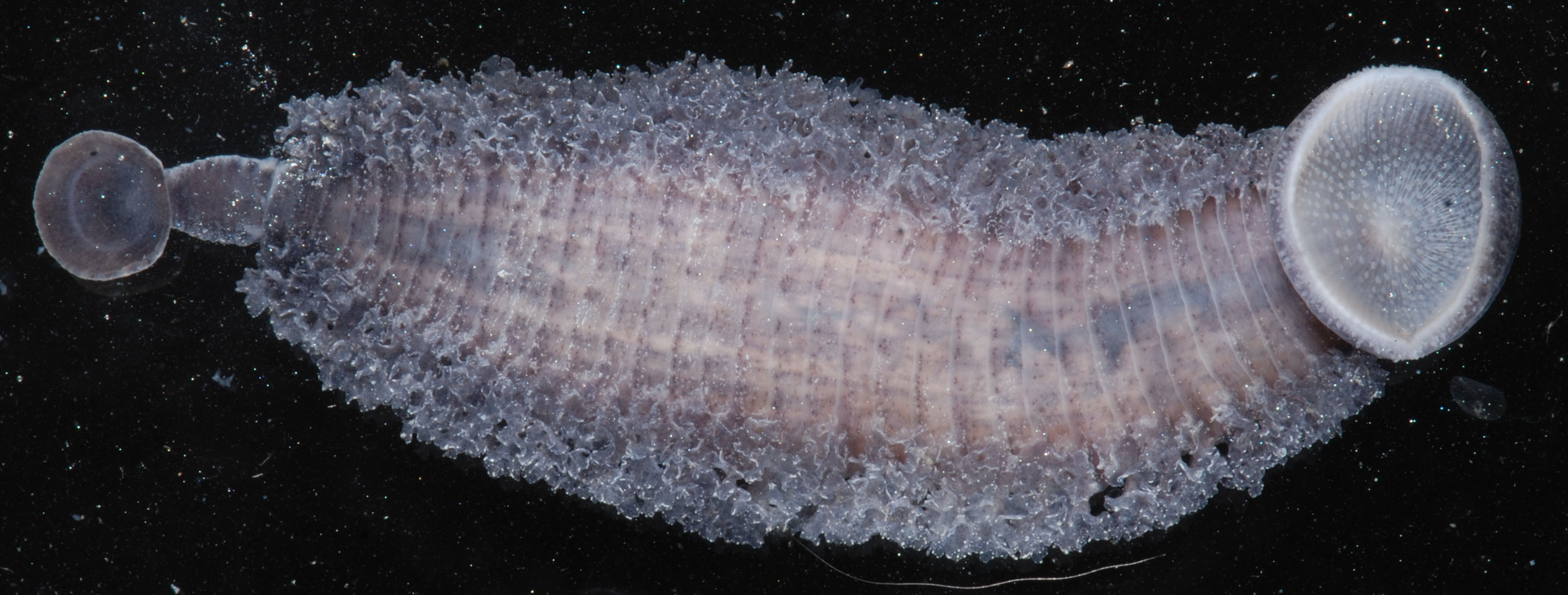
Underside of Branchellion torpedinis, 5 centimetres (2 in) long.

Branchellion torpedinis is found in the Atlantic Ocean along the coasts of the United States Europe, and Senegal. In 1994 the leech was discovered in Venezuela; it had been found along with another Branchellion species feeding on a spotted eagle ray which was caught by a fisherman near Ocumare de la Costa. It was also collected the same year on the same species in the Caribbean.

== Description ==
All members of the genus Branchellion sport distinctive leaf-shaped gills. B. torpedinis has 33 pairs of gills on each annulus located between its fourteenth and twenty-fifth segments. The gills do not move endogenously. In young leeches, the gills are reduced by "outfoldings of loose skin" similar to structures found on Trachelobdella lubrica.

=== Reproductive and genetic biology ===
The morphology of Branchellion torpedinis spermatozoa is "basically the same" as that of Piscicola geometra, a freshwater leech. In the leeches' post-embryonic development, their genital areas are "very conspicuous" unlike some other Rhynchobdellid species, such as Haementeria ghiliani. The leeches have 12 sets of chromosomes; this number varies among all leeches and even within the family Piscicolidae: for example, the Arhynchobdellid species Erpobdella octoculata has 8 sets of chromosomes, while the Piscicolid species Piscicola geometra has 16. There is a phylogenetic trend among leeches "for chromosomes to become smaller and more numerous". Humans, by contrast, have only two sets of chromosomes.

== Behaviour ==
Branchellion torpedinis is an exclusive parasite of elasmobranch fish. Their parasitism is known to cause death, and, more mildly, a variety of symptoms such as anorexia and anemia. Accidental introductions of B. torpedinis to aquariums are hard to manage. Many piscicolid leeches drop off from their fishy hosts after feeding to go plant their cocoons, but B. torpedinis is believed to be a permanent parasite, sticking to its hosts all its life.

== Bibliography ==
- Jimi, Naoto; Shinji, Junpei; Hookabe, Natsumi; Okanishi, Masanori; Woo, Sau Pinn; Nakano, Takafumi (2023). "A New Species of Branchellion (Hirudinea: Piscicolidae) Parasitizing the Gills of Short-tail Stingrays (Batoidea: Dasyatidae) From the West Pacific". Zoological Science. 40 (4): 308–313. doi:10.2108/zs220057. hdl:2433/284559. PMID 37522602.
- Marancik, David Paul (2012). Understanding the Pathologic and Immunologic Relationship Between Elasmobranchs and the Marine Leech Branchellion torpedinis (PDF) (PhD thesis). University of Georgia.
- Marancik, David P.; Dove, Alistair P.; Camus, Alvin C. (10 Oct 2012). "Experimental Infection of Yellow Stingrays Urobatis jamaicensis with the Marine Leech Branchellion torpedinis" (PDF). Diseases of Aquatic Organisms. 101 (1): 51–60. doi:10.3354/dao02508. PMID 23047191.
- Pauls, Sheila M.; Provenanzo, Fransisco (March 1999). "Branchellion torpedinis Savigny, 1822 (Hirudinea, Piscicolidae): primera cita de una sanguijuela marina para Venezuela" [Branchellion torpedinis Savigny, 1822 (Hirudinea, Piscicolidae): first record of a marine leech from Venezuela.]. Acta Biologica Venezuelica (in Spanish). 19 (1).
- Savigny, Jules-César (1822). "Système des Annelides, principalement de celles des côtes de l'Égypte et de la Syrie" [Systematics of Annelids, mainly those of the Egyptian and Syrian coasts]. Description de l'Égypte (in French). Vol. 1.
- Sawyer, Roy T. (1986). Leech Biology and Behaviour Volume I: Anatomy, Physiology, and Behaviour. Oxford Science Publishing. ISBN 0-19-857377-4.
- Williams, Ernest H.; Bunkley-Williams, Lucy; Burreson, Eugene (1994). "Some New Records of Marine and Freshwater Leeches from Caribbean, Southeastern U.S.A., Eastern Pacific, and Okinawan Animals" (PDF). Journal of the Helminthological Society of Washington. 61 (1).
