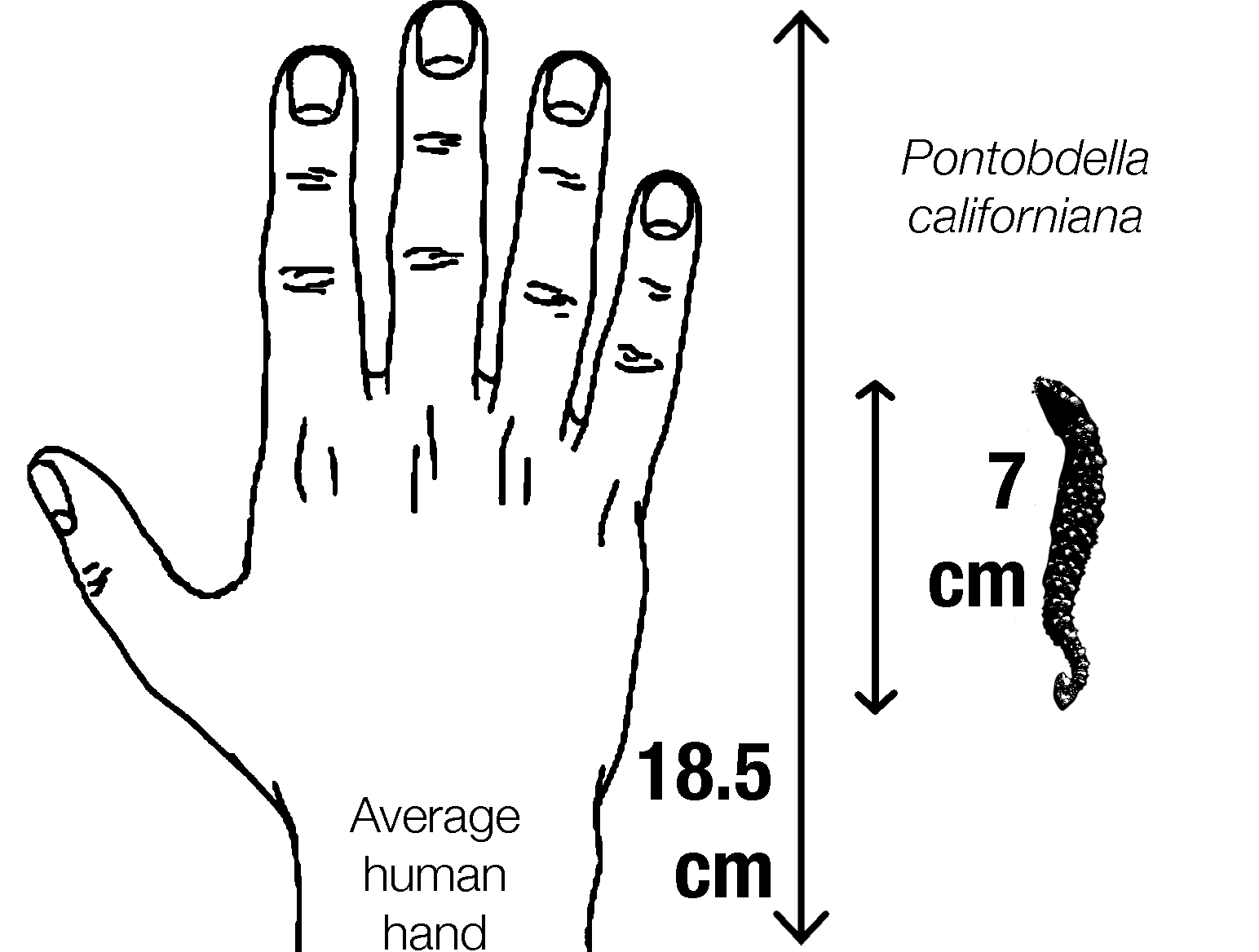
- Graphic comparing the maximum length of Pontobdella californiana with an average human hand.

Scientific classification
- Domain: Eukaryota
- Kingdom: Animalia
- Phylum: Annelida
- Clade: Pleistoannelida
- Clade: Sedentaria
- Class: Clitellata
- Subclass: Hirudinea
- Order: Rhynchobdellida
- Family: Piscicolidae
- Genus: Pontobdella
- Species: P. californiana

Binomial name
- Pontobdella californiana Burreson & Passarelli, 2015

= Pontobdella californiana =

Species of leech

Pontobdella californiana is a species of marine leech found off the southern Pacific coast of North America. They are relatively large, greenish, tubercle-covered leeches who parasitize skates and rays. The species was scientifically described in 2015 based on previously-collected specimens and has since been recorded elsewhere.

== Description ==
=== General appearance ===
Pontobdella californiana, like all Pontobdella species, is covered with round nodules on its back and on its underside. While adult leeches are generally green, with black, brown, and white splotches, the leech hatchlings are pale green. Pontobdella californiana is a relatively large species, growing up to 7 centimetres (2.8 in) long and 6 millimetres (0.24 in) across.

== Parasitism ==
Leeches in the genus Pontobdella are ectoparasites, feeding from their hosts on the outside rather than infesting them from within. The holotype was found on a big skate; leeches have also been recorded on thornback guitarfish and another skate.

== Taxonomy ==
Pontobdella californiana was described in 2015, based on already-collected specimens dating into the early 20th century. The species was first collected in 1904 on an expedition of the research vessel the USS Albatross. A 2015 paper identified the specimens as representing a new species. The specific epithet refers to its type location, California.

=== Classification ===
Pontobdella californiana is a jawless leech in the family Piscicolidae and the subfamily Pontobdellinae, the latter clade being restricted to only marine and brackish habitats.

=== Phylogeny ===
A molecular analysis published in 2024 found that Pontobdella californiana is the sister taxon to P. muricata. These two are in turn the sister group to a clade comprising P. leucothela and P. macrothela.

Cladogram illustrating species closely related to P. californiana

- - - P. californiana
    - P. muricata
  - - P. leucothela
    - P. macrothela

== Distribution ==
First described from the coast of California, Pontobdella californiana has since been found in coastal Oaxaca, México.

Specifically, in California it has been reported as far north as near Monterey Bay, and southwards around Los Angeles; in Oaxaca it was found in several places on the southern coast in the area of the Punta Cometa and La Ventanilla.
