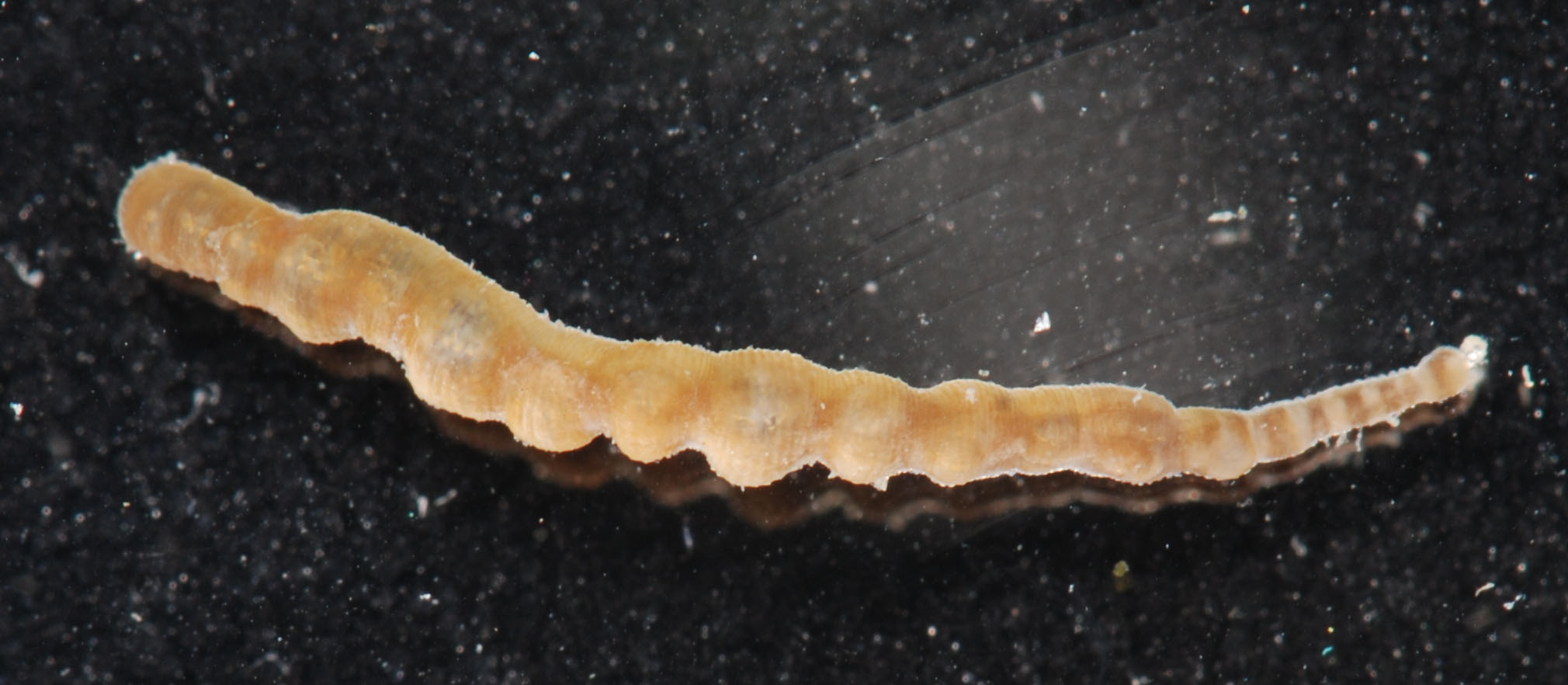

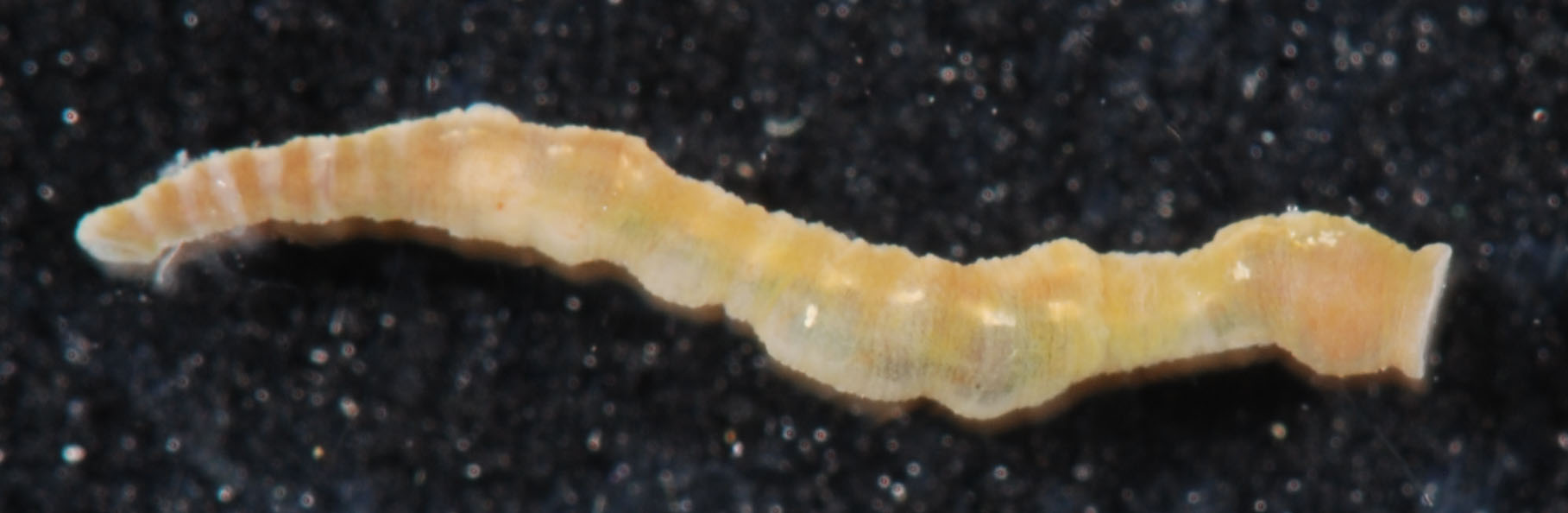

Scientific classification
- Domain: Eukaryota
- Kingdom: Animalia
- Phylum: Annelida
- Clade: Pleistoannelida
- Clade: Sedentaria
- Class: Clitellata
- Subclass: Hirudinea
- Order: Rhynchobdellida
- Family: Piscicolidae
- Genus: Myzobdella
- Species: M. lugubris

Binomial name
- Myzobdella lugubris Leidy, 1851

Synonyms
- List: Cystobranchus virginicus; Icthyobdella rapax; Illinobdella alba; Illinobdella elongata; Illinobdella richardsoni; Illinobdella moorei; Myzobdella funduli; Myzobdella moorei

= Crab leech =

Leech species

Myzobdella lugubris, the crab leech, is a species of jawless leech widespread in North America, especially in central and Eastern Canada. It is an ectoparasite of fish and crustaceans, and is responsible for several dangerous conditions in fish, including lesions infected by bacteria and fungi and possibly viral hemorrhagic septicemia. It lays its egg capsules on crabs and possible other arthropods, which then disperse the eggs.

Myzobdella lugubris is the type species for the genus Myzobdella, described by Joseph Leidy in 1851.

== Hosts & lifecycle ==
Myzobdella lugubris lives in brackish and fresh water and cannot tolerate high salinity waters- in this case, above 26 PSU- for very long. However, the species tolerates a wide range of temperatures, from 3 to 28 °C (37 to 82 °F), at minimum. Unusually among oligochaetes, each egg cocoon contains only one embryo.

=== Relationship with aquatic arthropods ===
The relationship between Myzobdella lugubris and aquatic arthropods is not fully understood. They are known to be commensal with crustaceans, and may also parasatize various aquatic arthropods, but there has been no conclusive record of M. lugubris actually feeding on an arthropod. It has been suggested that, in the absence of relevant crustacea, M. lugubris lays its cocoons on rocks and stones, but, once again, this has not been conclusively proven.

What is known for certain is that crustaceans act as vehicles for cocoon deposition and dispersion. The leeches lay their egg cocoons on the carapace of the crustaceans, sometimes in great numbers: one study found an average of 118 cocoons on 18 crabs. Another related species, Myzobdella platensis, may be a true parasite of the blue crab. Other animals affected by M. lugubris include shrimp, oysters, crayfish and prawns.

=== Relationship with fish ===
Besides laying its eggs on and being commensal with crustaceans, Myzobdella lugubris is a semi-permanent parasite on over forty fish species, and, in one instance, a turtle, displaying little host preference. It spends most of its life on brackish teleosts, using crustaceans only to deposit its egg cocoons. It usually attaches to the fins and skin of host fishes, in the anterior and dorsal regions, although it has also been reported from the mouths of fish, sometimes in great numbers.

A Myzobdella lugubris infestation holds many dangers for fish, besides actively sucking their blood. Generally, the wounds it leaves on the host fish allow bacteria and fungi to enter, superficially infecting the wound. In the mouth, circular mucosal depressions are left at the site of attachment. The severe lesions it causes on the undersides of the heads of catfish often become infected with fungus, of the genus Saprolegnia and other related filamentous fungi. Several bacteria have been reported from the leech's viscera, the most notable being Flavobacterium psychrophilum, a bacteroid responsible for Bacterial cold water disease.

== Invasiveness ==
Myzobdella lugubris is an invasive species in many parts outside its native range, having been introduced to Western North American Waters, Hawaii, and even in the Adriatic Sea. In Hawaii, it has been reported on 40% of fishes in streams.
