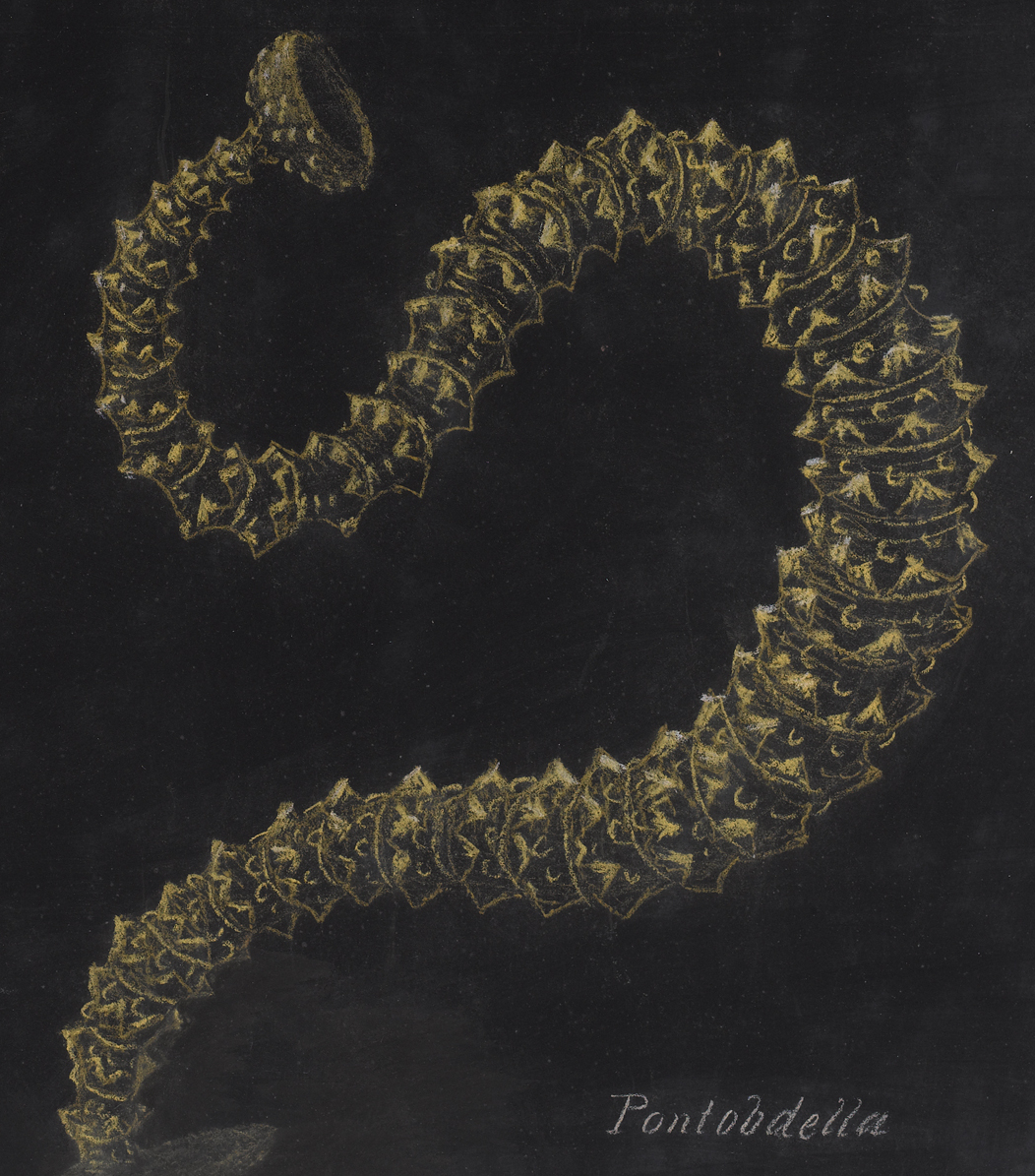

Scientific classification
- Kingdom: Animalia
- Phylum: Annelida
- Clade: Pleistoannelida
- Clade: Sedentaria
- Class: Clitellata
- Subclass: Hirudinea
- Order: Rhynchobdellida
- Family: Piscicolidae
- Genus: Pontobdella; Leach, 1815

Type species
- Hirudo muricata

= Pontobdella =

Genus of leeches

Pontobdella is a species of marine leeches with a cosmopolitan distribution. They are covered with tubercles and their primary hosts are rays, sharks, skates, and sawfish.

== Distribution ==
Pontobdella species are found on the coasts of Africa, Eurasia, the Americas, New Zealand, and even Antarctica.

== Characteristics ==
A prominent feature of Pontobdella leeches are the "wart-like" tubercles which cover their bodies all over. Pontobdella's hosts are generally elasmobranchs – rays, sharks, skates, and sawfish. Each segment of the leech's body (and all leeches have 32) has three or four annuli. They are large leeches; one species, Pontobdella novaezealandiae, can grow as long as 20 centimetres.

== Classification ==
The genus was described by William Elford Leach. Pontobdella is placed in the family Piscicolidae, and is confirmed to form a monophyletic grouping.

== Species ==
The World Register of Marine Species lists the following species:

- Pontobdella aculeata Harding, 1924
- Pontobdella afra Baird, 1869
- Pontobdella biannulata Moore, 1957
- Pontobdella californiana Burreson & Passarelli, 2015
- Pontobdella dispar Cordero, 1938
- Pontobdella leucothela Schmarda, 1861
- Pontobdella macrothela Schmarda, 1861
- Pontobdella moorei Oka, 1910
- Pontobdella muricata (Linnaeus, 1758)
- Pontobdella novaezealandiae Burreson & Williams, 2008
- Pontobdella oligothela Schmarda, 1861
- Pontobdella prionodiscus Schmarda, 1861
- Pontobdella variegata Baird, 1869
- Pontobdella vosmaeri (Apáthy, 1888)
