= Caspiobdella =

Scientific classification
- Kingdom: Animalia
- Phylum: Annelida
- Clade: Pleistoannelida
- Clade: Sedentaria
- Class: Clitellata
- Subclass: Hirudinea
- Order: Rhynchobdellida
- Family: Piscicolidae
- Genus: Caspiobdella; Epshtein, 1966

Genus of annelid worms

Caspiobdella is a genus of annelids belonging to the family Piscicolidae. The species of this genus are found in Europe.

The genus includes the following species:

- Caspiobdella caspica (Selensky, 1915)
- Caspiobdella fadejewi Epshtein, 1961
- Caspiobdella tuberculata Epshtein, 1966
- Caspiobdella volgensis (Zykoff, 1903)
