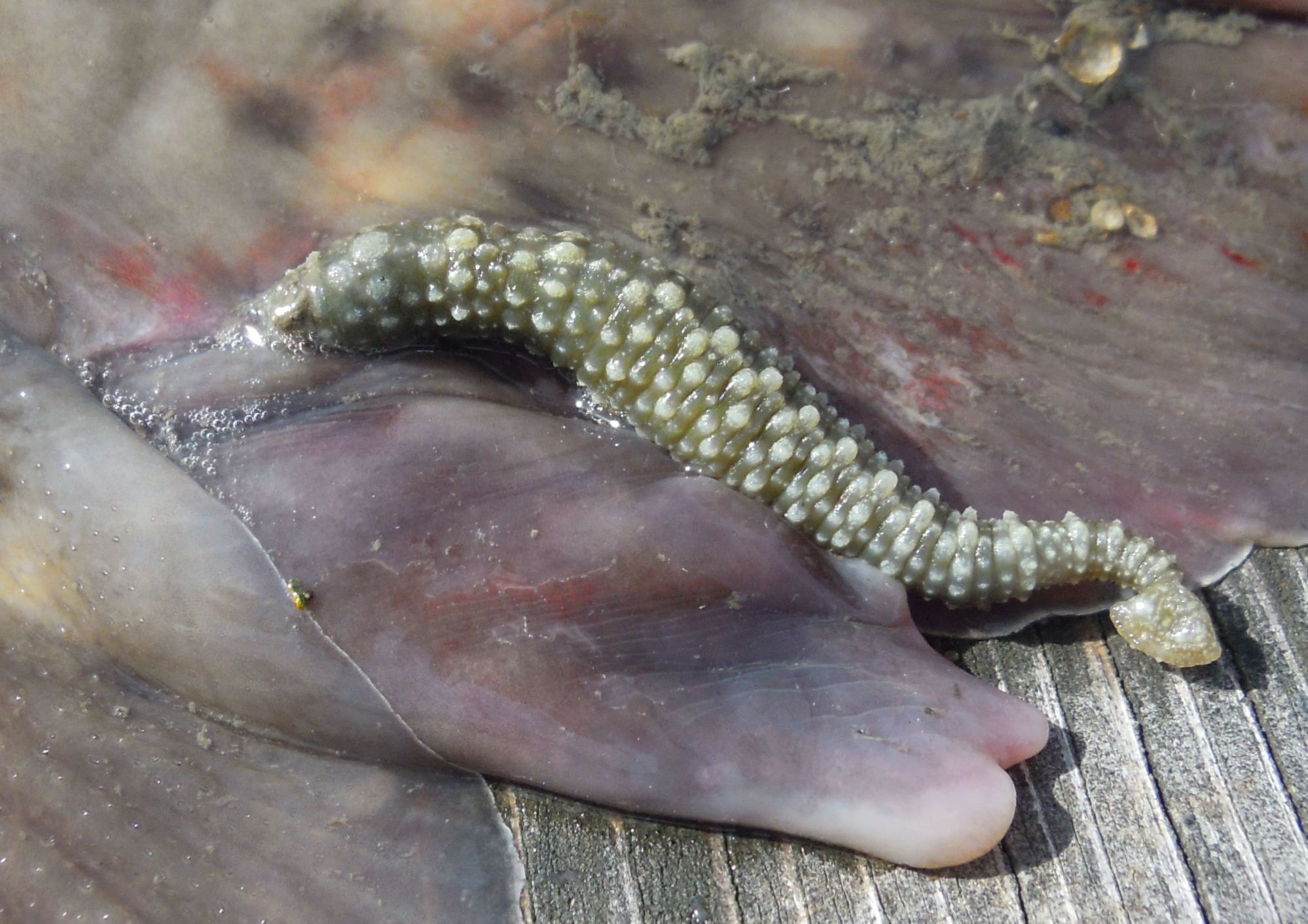
- P. muricata on a thornback ray

Scientific classification
- Kingdom: Animalia
- Phylum: Annelida
- Clade: Pleistoannelida
- Clade: Sedentaria
- Class: Clitellata
- Subclass: Hirudinea
- Order: Rhynchobdellida
- Family: Piscicolidae
- Genus: Pontobdella
- Species: P. muricata

Binomial name
- Pontobdella muricata (Linnaeus, 1758)

Synonyms
- Hirudo muricata Linnaeus, 1758

= Pontobdella muricata =

Species of annelid (marine leech)

Pontobdella muricata is a species of marine leech in the family Piscicolidae. It is a parasite of fishes and is native to the northeastern Atlantic Ocean, the Baltic Sea, the North Sea, and the Mediterranean Sea.

== Description ==
Pontobdella muricata is a long, cylindrical, somewhat flattened leech, narrowing at both ends. It has a number of annulations, which do not correspond to its internal segmentation, and is one of the largest sea leeches, with a length up to 10 cm (4 in) long when at rest, and double that length when stretched. The anterior end has a sucker with which it feeds, and the posterior end bears another sucker with which it adheres to its host. The skin is rough and covered with small warts; the colour varies, juveniles are usually black or dark green with small speckles, while adults are pale grey, tan, or olive-green.

== Distribution and habitat ==
Native to the northeastern Atlantic Ocean, the species ranges from the Arctic, the Baltic Sea, and the North Sea, to the Mediterranean Sea. It has also been reported from the United States, Canada, Namibia, and Pakistan, but some of these records may be due to misidentification. It is found on the seabed at depths down to about 100 m (330 ft) and attached to large demersal fish.

== Ecology ==
This leech is an external parasite of cartilagenous fishes such as the marbled electric ray (Torpedo marmorata), the common stingray (Dasyatis pastinaca), and the thornback ray (Raja clavata), and less often of ray-finned fish such as the European plaice (Pleuronectes platessa), the black scorpionfish (Scorpaena porcus), and the red scorpionfish (S. scrofa). It is found attached to the gills, the abdomen, and the bases of the fins of the host, where it feeds by sucking blood. It is quiescent during the day, holding itself motionless and partially coiled, attached by its posterior sucker, but becomes active at night, when it feeds. It can separate from its host and swim by flattening its body. It is the intermediate host for the protozoan Trypanosoma raiae, which it carries in its gut and transmits to rays.

Like all leeches, P. muricata is a hermaphrodite, and fertilisation is internal. The eggs pass through the clitellum, where each is enclosed in a spherical cocoon. These are attached to empty bivalve or gastropod shells on the seabed and are pale at first, but darken with age. They are often irregularly grouped together, each with a slender, twisted stalk connecting it to a spreading, membranous holdfast. The sphere is filled with a thick, gelatinous material with the developing embryo spirally coiled within. When it is nearly 2.5 cm (1 in) long and ready to hatch, a pair of small, rounded protuberances at the side of the sphere fall off, allowing the juvenile leech to emerge, and search for a suitable host fish.
