= Pawlowskiella =

Scientific classification
- Kingdom: Animalia
- Phylum: Annelida
- Clade: Pleistoannelida
- Clade: Sedentaria
- Class: Clitellata
- Subclass: Hirudinea
- Order: Rhynchobdellida
- Family: Piscicolidae
- Genus: Pawlowskiella; Bielecki, 1997

Genus of annelid worms

Pawlowskiella is a genus of annelids belonging to the family Piscicolidae. The species of this genus are found in Europe.

The genus includes the following species:

- Pawlowskiella stenosa Bielecki, 1997
