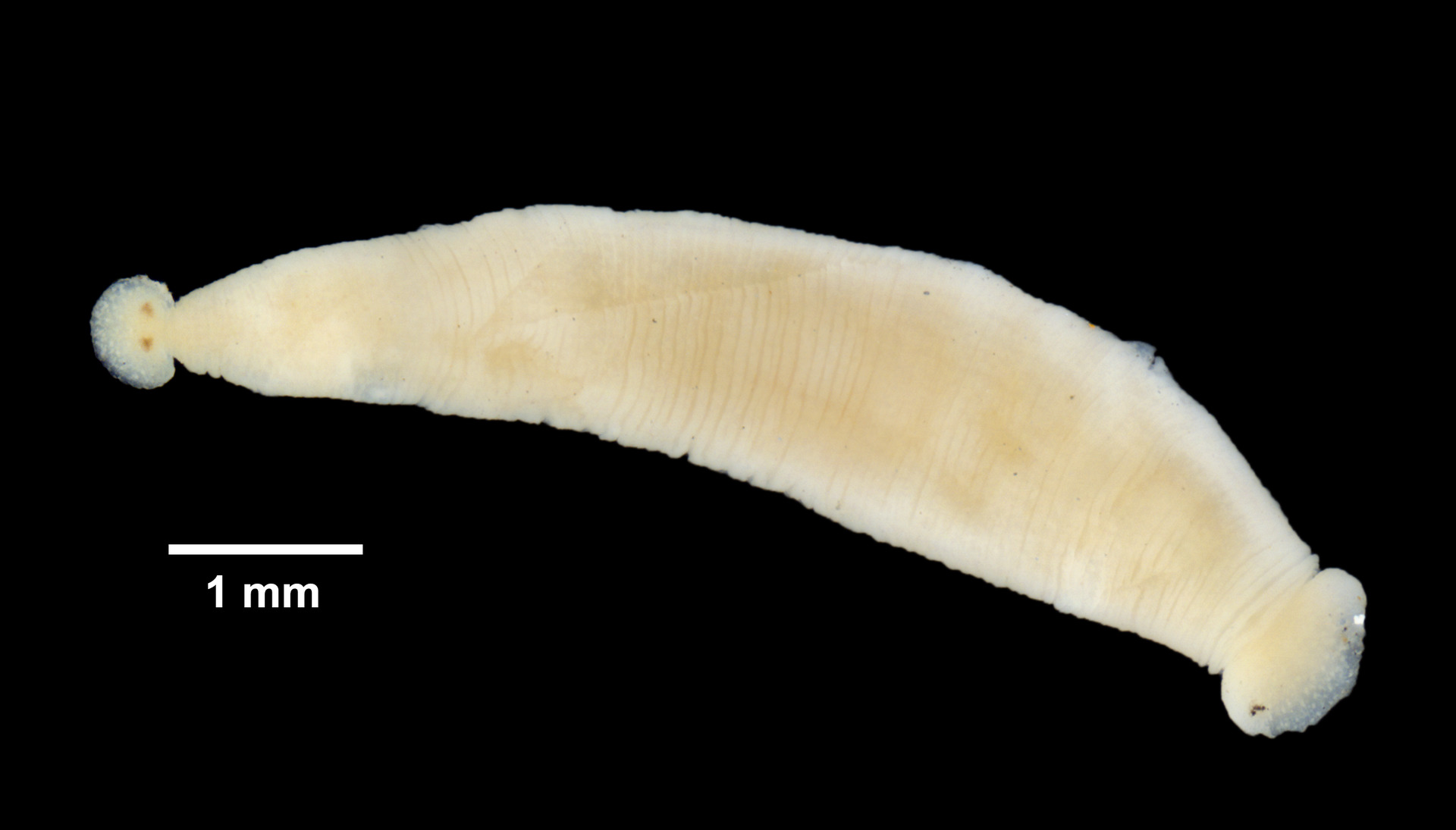

Scientific classification
- Kingdom: Animalia
- Phylum: Annelida
- Clade: Pleistoannelida
- Clade: Sedentaria
- Class: Clitellata
- Subclass: Hirudinea
- Order: Rhynchobdellida
- Family: Piscicolidae
- Genus: Calliobdella van Beneden & Hesse, 1863

= Calliobdella =

Genus of annelid worms

Calliobdella is a genus of annelids belonging to the family Piscicolidae. The species of this genus are found in Europe and Northern America.

Species in this genus include:

- Calliobdella knightjonesi Burreson, 1984
- Calliobdella lophii Van Beneden & Hesse, 1863
- Calliobdella mammillata (Malm, 1863)
- Calliobdella nodulifera (Malm, 1863)
- Calliobdella punctata Beneden & Hesse, 1863
