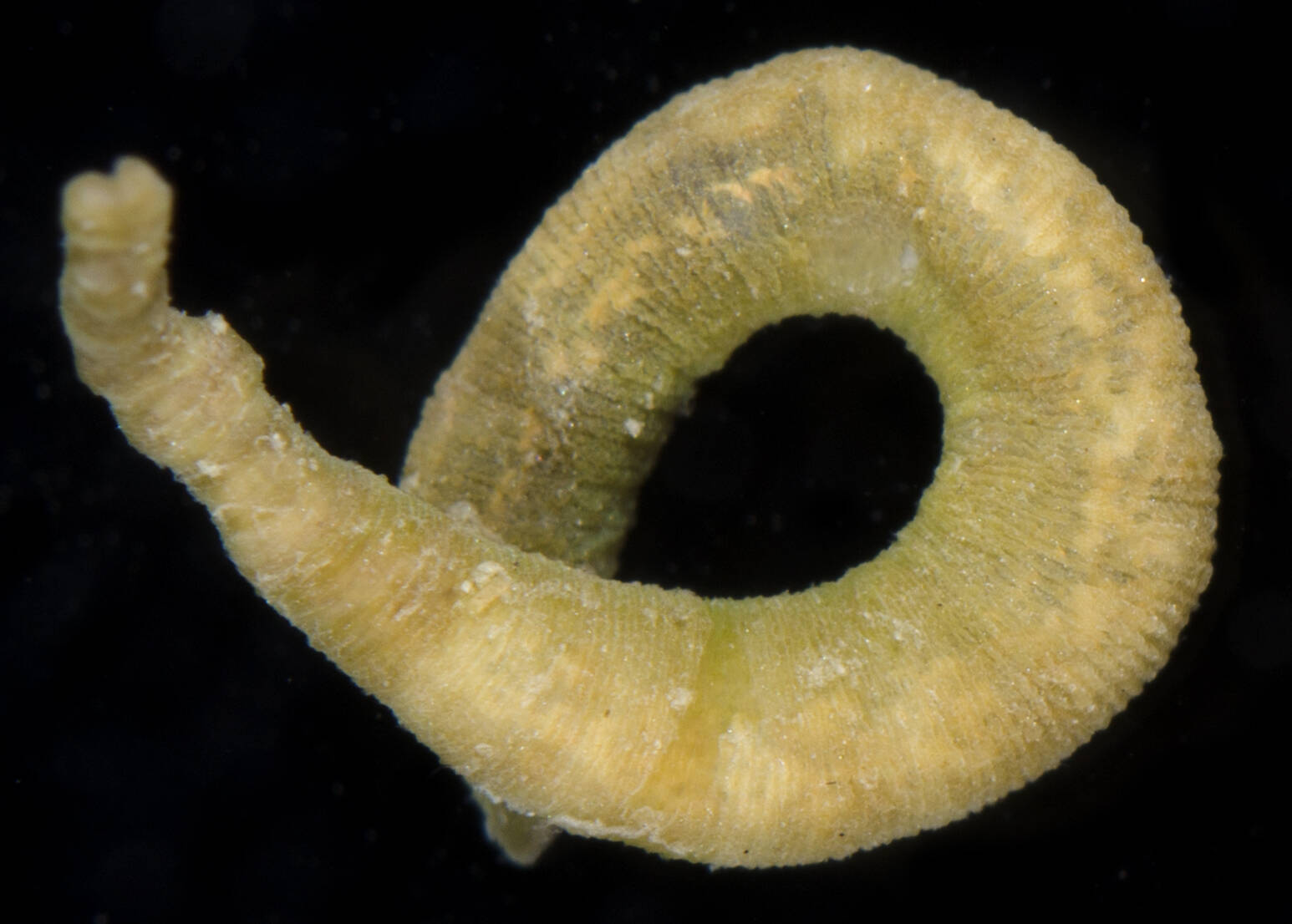
- Myzobdella lugubris

Scientific classification
- Kingdom: Animalia
- Phylum: Annelida
- Clade: Pleistoannelida
- Clade: Sedentaria
- Class: Clitellata
- Subclass: Hirudinea
- Order: Rhynchobdellida
- Family: Piscicolidae
- Genus: Myzobdella; Leidy, 1851

Type species
- Myzobdella lugubris

Synonyms
- Illinobdella Meyer, 1940

= Myzobdella =

Genus of leech

Myzobdella is a genus of leeches in the family Piscicolidae. The genus name derives from two Greek words: μυζω (I suck), and βδελλα (leech).

It includes the following species:

- Myzobdella lugubris Leidy, 1851
  - (= M. patzcuarensis (Cabellero, 1940))
- Myzobdella platensis (Cordero, 1933)
- Myzobdella uruguayensis (Mañé-Garzón & Montero, 1977)
- ? Myzobdella reducta (Meyer, 1940)
