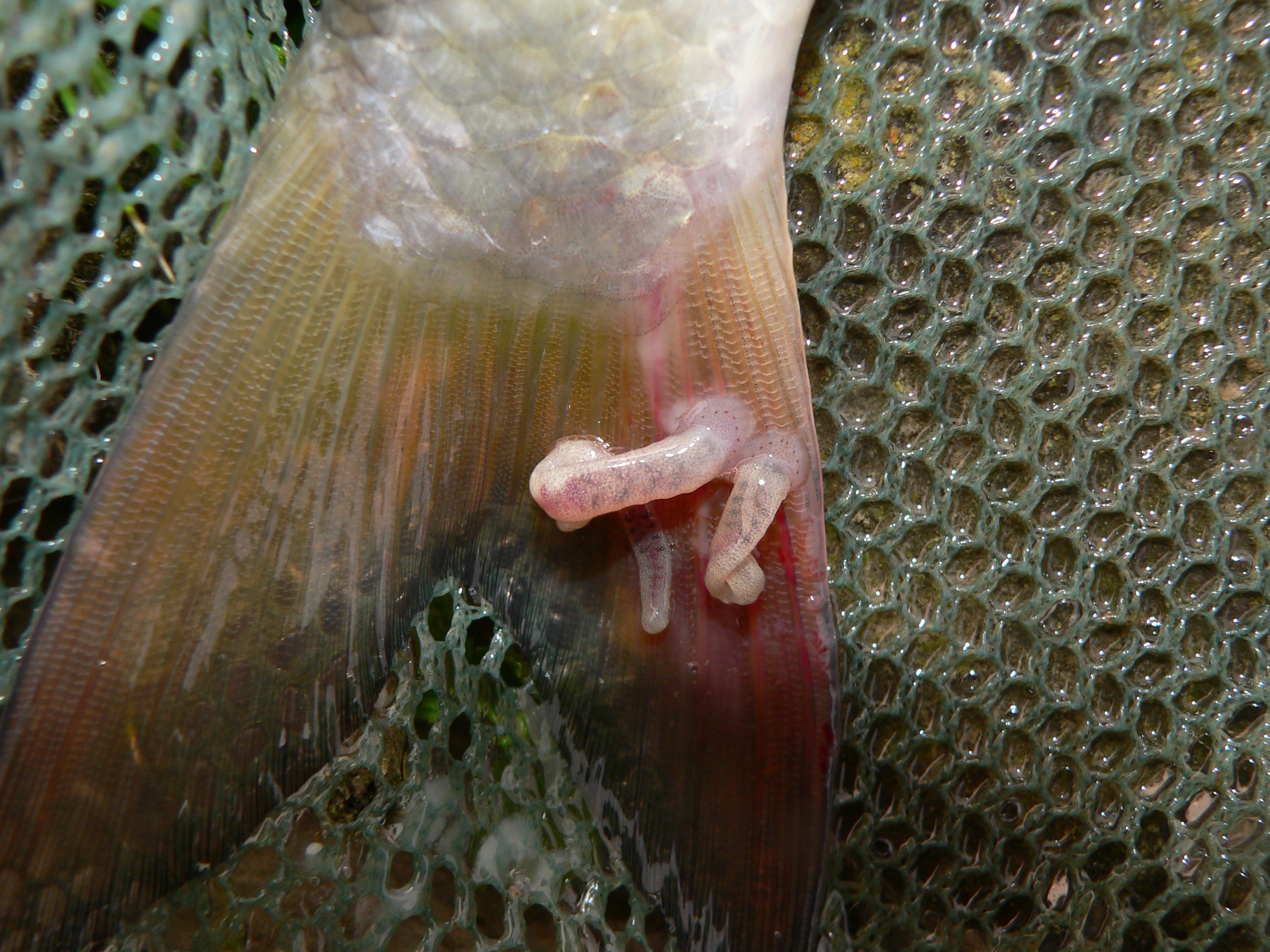

Scientific classification
- Kingdom: Animalia
- Phylum: Annelida
- Clade: Pleistoannelida
- Clade: Sedentaria
- Class: Clitellata
- Subclass: Hirudinea
- Order: Rhynchobdellida
- Family: Piscicolidae
- Genus: Cystobranchus; Diesing, 1859

Species
- Cystobranchus fasciatus (Kollar, 1842); Cystobranchus meyeri Hayunga & Grey, 1976; Cystobranchus mammillatus (Malm, 1863); Cystobranchus moorei (Moore, 1936); Cystobranchus pawlowskii Sket, 1968; Cystobranchus salmostiticus Meyer, 1940; Cystobranchus verrilli Meyer, 1940; Cystobranchus virginicus Hoffman, 1964; Cystobranchus vividus Verrill, 1872

= Cystobranchus =

Genus of annelid worms

Cystobranchus is a genus of leeches (Hirudinea) belonging to the family Piscicolidae. These leeches are associated with freshwater fishes and closely related to the genus Piscicola. They are distributed in Europe and North America. They attach themselves on the external part of fish and feed on their blood, which could cause the fish to be more susceptible to stressors and diseases.

Species in this genus include:

- Cystobranchus fasciatus (Kollar, 1842)
- Cystobranchus meyeri Hayunga & Grey, 1976
- Cystobranchus mammillatus (Malm, 1863)
- Cystobranchus moorei (Moore, 1936)
- Cystobranchus pawlowskii Sket, 1968
- Cystobranchus salmostiticus Meyer, 1940
- Cystobranchus verrilli Meyer, 1940
- Cystobranchus virginicus Hoffman, 1964
- Cystobranchus vividus Verrill, 1872
