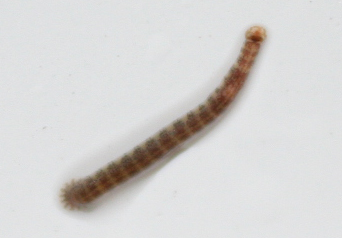
- Piscicola geometra

Scientific classification
- Kingdom: Animalia
- Phylum: Annelida
- Clade: Pleistoannelida
- Clade: Sedentaria
- Class: Clitellata
- Subclass: Hirudinea
- Order: Rhynchobdellida
- Family: Piscicolidae
- Genus: Piscicola de Blainville, 1818

= Piscicola =

Genus of leeches

Piscicola is a genus of leeches belonging to the family Piscicolidae. The species of this genus are found in Europe and Northern America.

The genus includes the following species:

- Piscicola annae Bielecki, 1997
- Piscicola borowieci Bielecki, 1997
- Piscicola geometra
