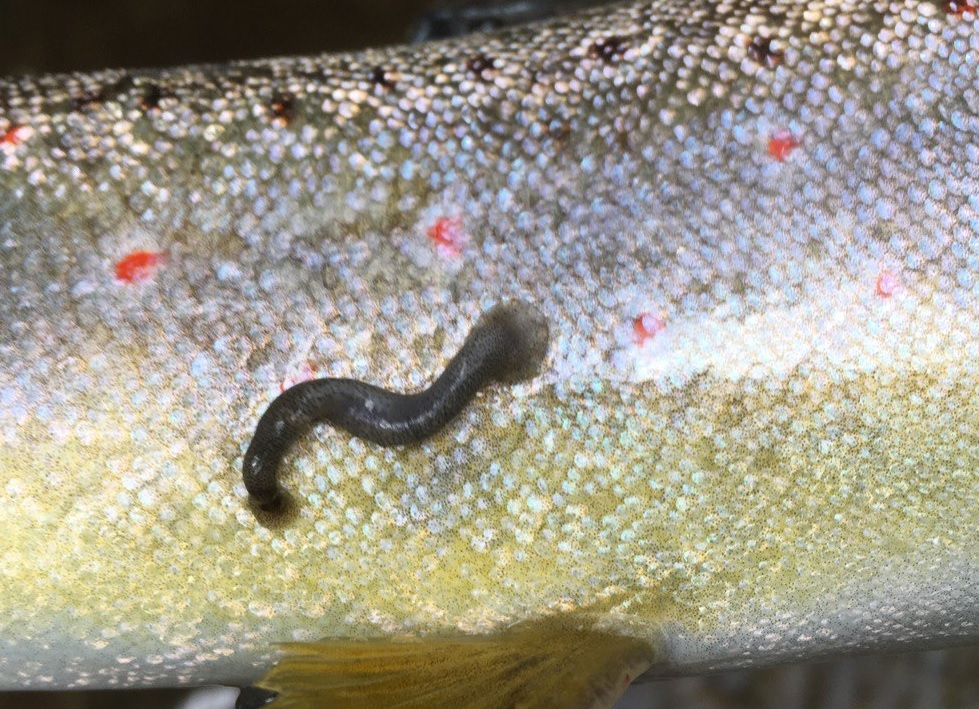
- P. geometra parasitizing a river trout

Scientific classification
- Kingdom: Animalia
- Phylum: Annelida
- Clade: Pleistoannelida
- Clade: Sedentaria
- Class: Clitellata
- Subclass: Hirudinea
- Order: Rhynchobdellida
- Family: Piscicolidae
- Genus: Piscicola
- Species: P. geometra

Binomial name
- Piscicola geometra (Linnaeus, 1761)

Synonyms
- Hirudo geometra Linnaeus, 1758

= Piscicola geometra =

Species of annelid worm

Piscicola geometra is a species of leech in the family Piscicolidae. It is an external parasite of marine, brackish and freshwater fishes. It was first described as Hirudo geometra by the Swedish naturalist Carl Linnaeus in his Systema Naturae in 1758.

== Description ==
This leech can grow to a length of 25 mm (1 in). It is pale brown, often with white transverse bands.

== Distribution and habitat ==
This fish leech occurs in freshwater locations in the Holarctic and Neotropic regions and is found in northwestern Europe and in North America. It is also present in some marine environments such as the Baltic Sea where it mainly parasitises shorthorn sculpin and flounders. It occurs in both moving and stagnant water, but seems to prefer well-oxygenated water at the wave-washed edges of lakes and rapidly flowing streams and rivers.

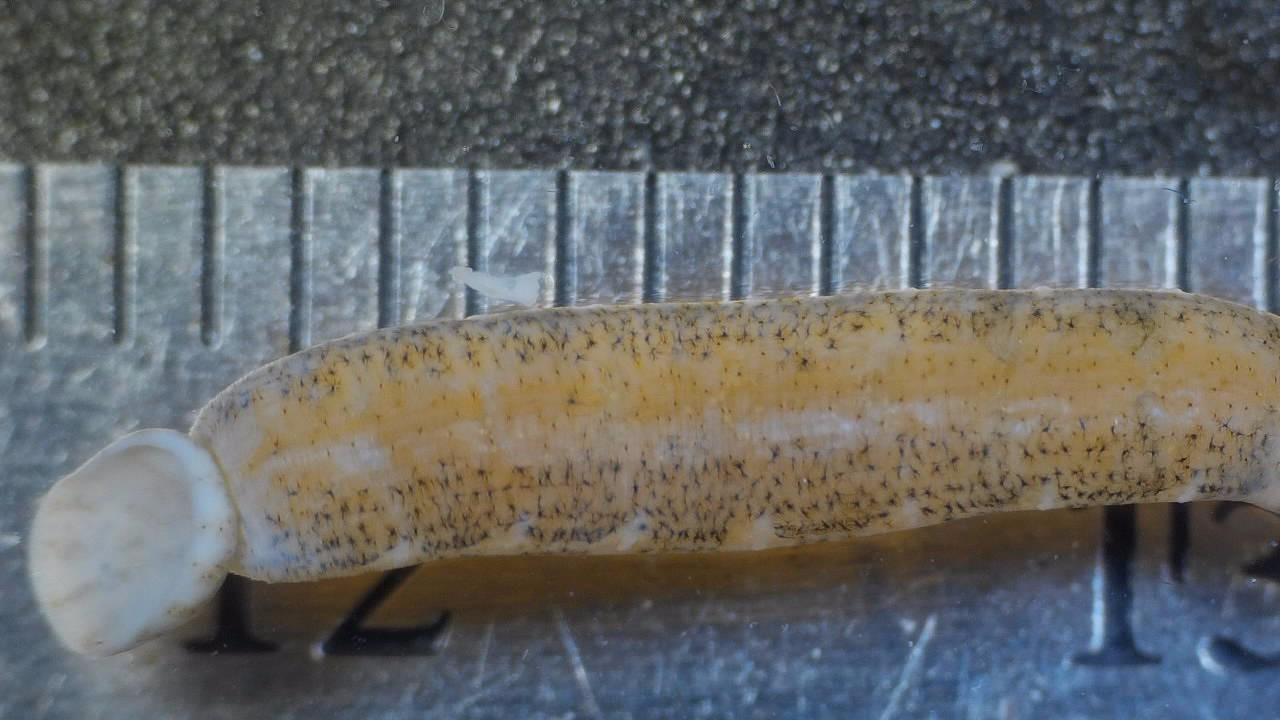

== Ecology ==
P. geometra is an ectoparasite of various fish species. Hosts include salmon (Salmo salar), brown trout (Salmo trutta), European eel (Anguilla anguilla), charr (Salvelinus alpinus), gudgeon (Gobio gobio), bream (Abramis brama), perch (Perca fluviatilis), Prussian carp (Carassius gibelio) and common carp (Cyprinus carpio). The attachment site is on various parts of the body, on the gills or inside the mouth.

This leech can swim well and is attracted by the presence of a suitable fish in its vicinity. It feeds periodically, attaching itself to the fish's body with its sucking disc before puncturing its skin with its proboscis and sucking its blood. When satiated, it releases its grip and sinks to the bottom, hiding among stones or submerged plants while digesting its meal. It needs several blood meals before it can reproduce. The mid-gut and adjoining mycetomes (pouches), contain symbiotic bacteria which help with the digestion of blood, provide additional nutrients, and prevent the entry of pathogens.

Leeches are hermaphrodite and pair up to impregnate each other by hypodermic injection. The eggs are laid in dark brown cocoons which are cemented to submerged objects. After the eggs hatch, the juvenile leeches must seek out suitable fish hosts. The whole life cycle takes about four weeks to complete.
