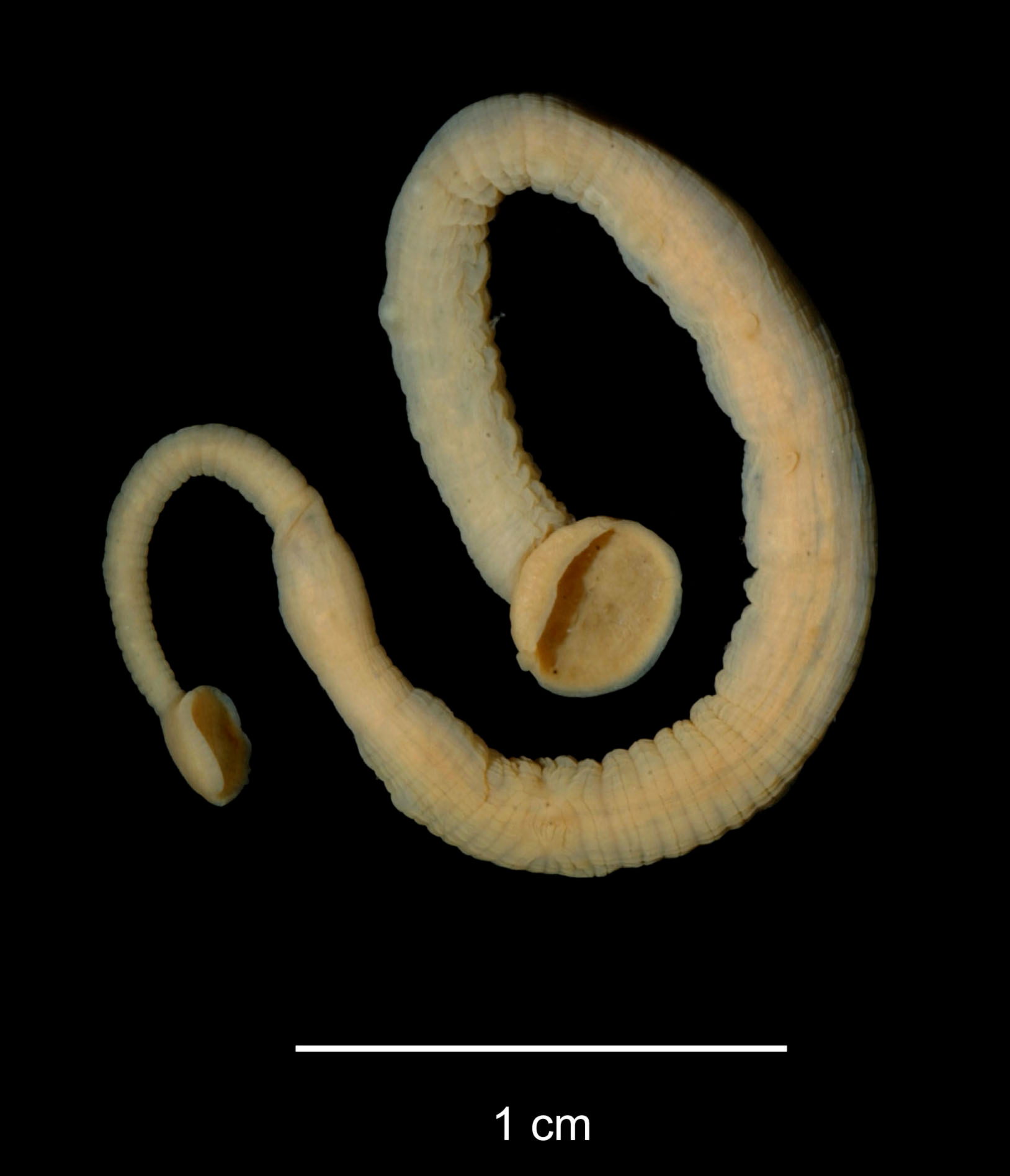

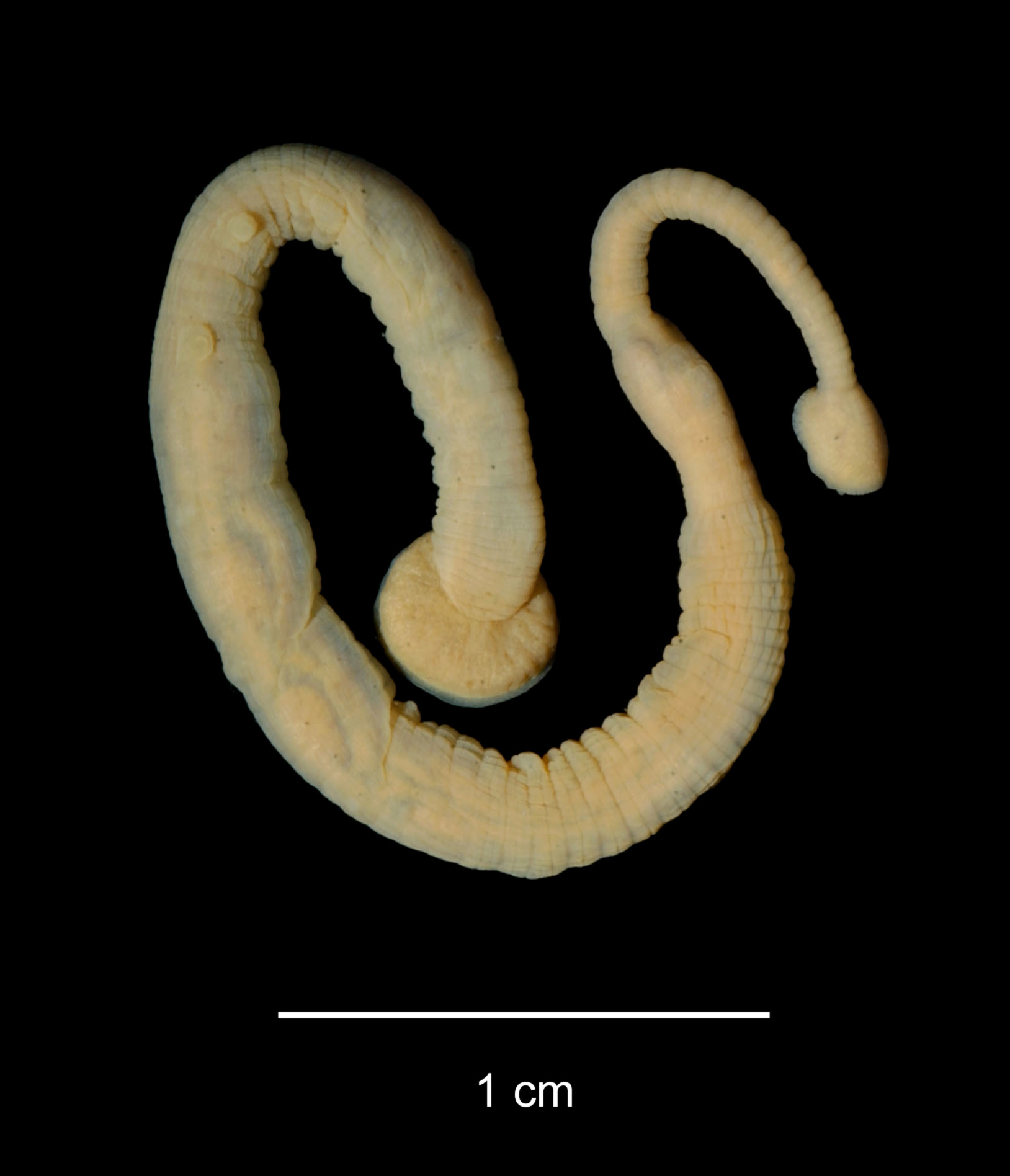

Scientific classification
- Kingdom: Animalia
- Phylum: Annelida
- Clade: Pleistoannelida
- Clade: Sedentaria
- Class: Clitellata
- Subclass: Hirudinea
- Order: Rhynchobdellida
- Family: Piscicolidae
- Genus: Trachelobdella
- Species: T. lubrica

Binomial name
- Trachelobdella lubrica (Grube, 1840)

Synonyms
- Pontobdella lubrica Grube, 1840; Trachelobdella kolleri (Diesing, 1850); Trachelobdella luederitzi (Augener, 1936); Trachelobdella muelleri (Diesing, 1850)

= Trachelobdella lubrica =

Species of marine leech

Trachelobdella lubrica is a species of marine leech in the family Piscicolidae. It is a parasite of fish and has a worldwide distribution in the equatorial belt. It was first described in 1840 by the German zoologist Adolph Eduard Grube, the type locality being Palermo, Sicily, in the Mediterranean Sea.

== Description ==
Like other leeches, Trachelobdella lubrica has a flexible extensible body; when fully stretched it reaches about 3.5 cm (1.4 in). The anterior end has a small sucker and is very narrow. The next section, or neck, is about twice as thick as the "head" part, and the body becomes thick and bloated at the posterior end, which is terminated by a large sucker with which it holds onto the substrate. There are no gills, but there are about 14 pairs of vesicles on the sides which pulsate, and may play a part in respiration. The posterior segment is very large and rounded, with three vesicles, 2 lateral and one dorsal. This leech may be brownish-black or grey, but can also be yellowish-orange, light brown, or dark green. When at rest, it folds its head end in the shape of an "S", which gives it the nickname of the "black swan leech".

== Distribution and habitat ==
Trachelobdella lubrica has a global distribution in tropical waters and some temperate waters. It is present in the Mediterranean Sea and the eastern Atlantic Ocean, from the British Isles to South Africa, and is also present in the western Atlantic and the Caribbean Sea. In the Indo-Pacific region, it is present in the Red Sea, the Arabian Sea, Japan, Australia and Hawaii. It usually inhabits shallow coastal waters down to about 50 m (160 ft), but has been recorded as deep as 180 m (600 ft) in the western Atlantic.

== Ecology ==
Trachelobdella lubrica is hematophagous, feeding on the blood of various species of bony fish. It lurks in shallow waters awaiting a suitable fish onto which it latches. The initial attachment may be anywhere on the skin or on the eyes, and it subsequently makes its way to the gill chambers, and attaches there. Host fish on which it has been found include the rock goby (Gobius paganellus), the ballan wrasse (Labrus bergylta), the East Atlantic peacock wrasse (Symphodus tinca), the European bass (Dicentrarchus labrax), the brown meagre (Sciaena umbra), the black scorpionfish (Scorpaena scrofa), the spotted scorpionfish (Scorpaena plumieri), the red lionfish (Pterois volitans), the red hind (Epinephelus guttatus), the Nassau grouper (Epinephelus striatus), the common two-banded sea bream (Diplodus vulgaris) and the Western Atlantic seabream (Archosargus rhomboidalis).

Leeches are hermaphrodites; a pair will approach each other and will mate in a head to tail fashion, with fertilisation being internal. Each partner then produces about 100 eggs, each egg being enclosed in a cocoon secreted by the clitellum. The adults die after the eggs are laid, and the embryos develop directly in the cocoons without a larval stage taking place. The juveniles that emerge through small holes in the sides of cocoons are translucent and poorly pigmented, the internal organs being visible through the cuticle. They will soon need to find a host fish from which to take their first blood meal.
