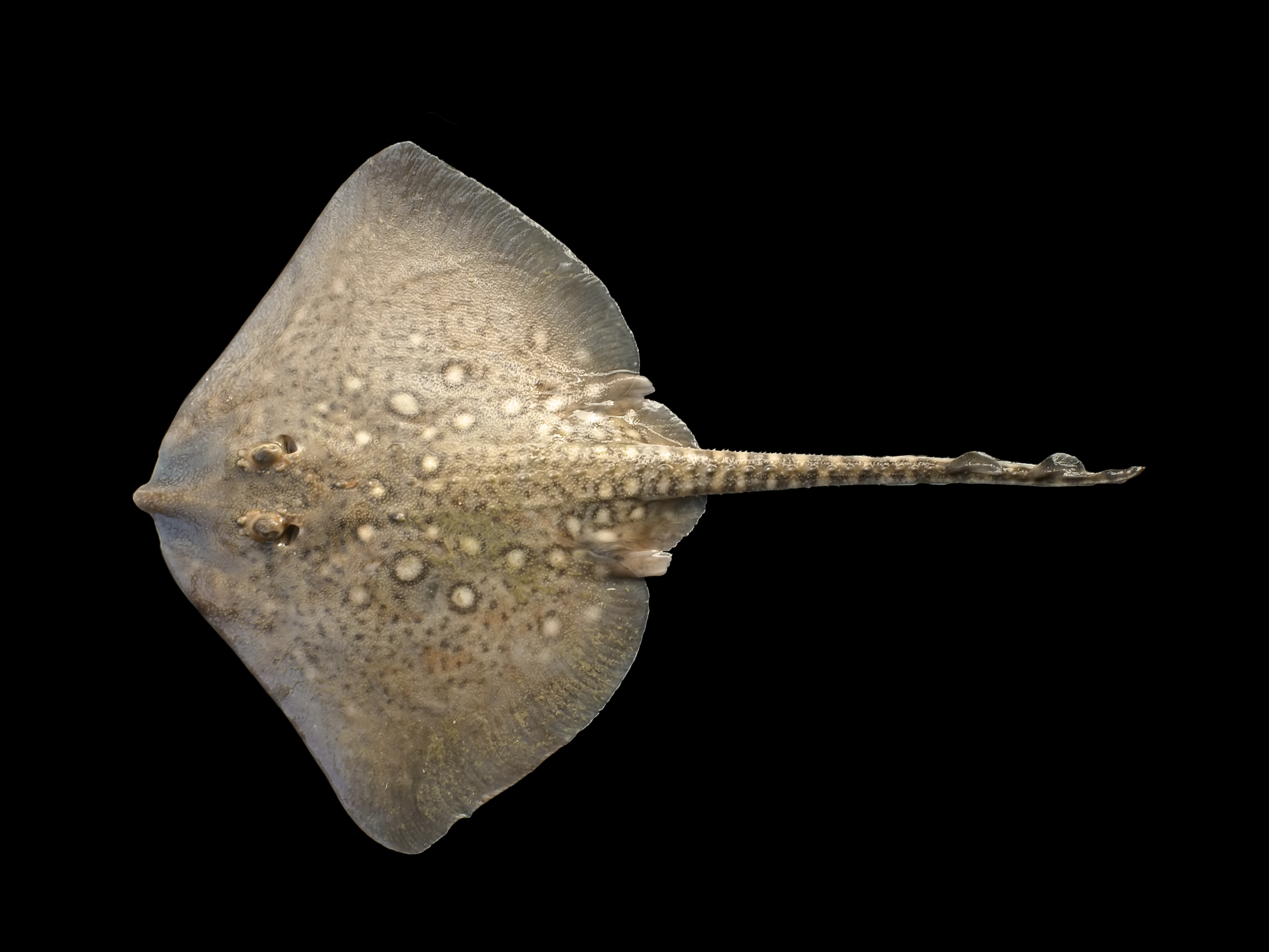

Conservation status
- Near Threatened (IUCN 3.1)

Scientific classification
- Kingdom: Animalia
- Phylum: Chordata
- Class: Chondrichthyes
- Subclass: Elasmobranchii
- Order: Rajiformes
- Family: Rajidae
- Genus: Raja
- Species: R. clavata

Binomial name
- Raja clavata Linnaeus, 1758

= Thornback ray =

Species of cartilaginous fish

The thornback ray (Raja clavata), or thornback skate, is a species of ray fish in the family Rajidae.

== Distribution ==
The Thornback ray is found in the Atlantic coastal waters of Europe and western Africa. It is also present from South Africa to the southwestern Indian Ocean and in the Mediterranean and Black Seas. It is native possibly as far south as Namibia and South Africa.

Its natural habitats are open large seas and shallow seas. It is sometimes seen trapped in large estuarine pools at low tide.

The thornback ray is probably one of the most common rays encountered by divers.

== Habitat ==
The thornback ray is usually found on sedimentary seabeds such as mud, sand or gravel at depths between 10 and 60 m. Juvenile fish feed on small crustaceans, particularly amphipods and bottom-living shrimps; adults feed on crabs, shrimps and small fish.

The thornback ray is a demersal species and has been found from inshore to 300 metres (980 ft). More infrequently it has been found as deep as 1,020 metres (3,350 ft).

== Description ==
Like all rays, the thornback ray has a flattened body with broad, wing-like pectoral fins. The body is kite-shaped with a long, thorny tail. The back is covered in numerous thorny spines, as is the underside in older females. The upper and lower jaws have between 36-44 rows.

Adult fish can grow to 1 metre (3.3 ft) in length, although most are less than 85 centimetres (33 in). This ray can weigh from 4.5 to 8.75 lb (2 to 4 kg).

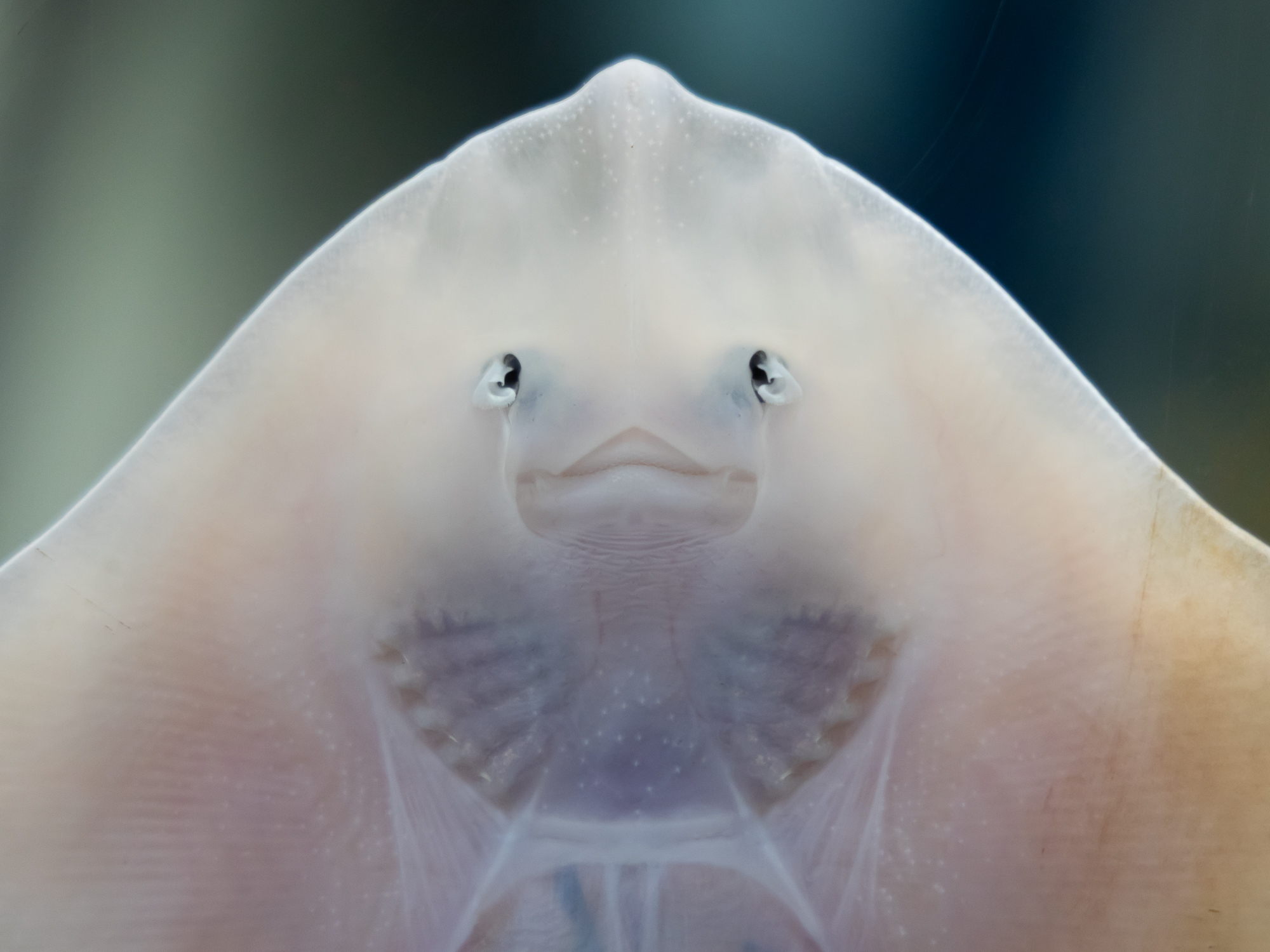
Personified face of a thornback ray

Their colours vary from light brown to grey with darker blotches and numerous small darker spots and yellow patches. Sometimes the yellow patches are surrounded by small dark spots. The underside is creamy-white with a greyish margin. When threatened they can appear black.

In sexually mature fish, some of the spines are thickened with button-like bases (known as bucklers). These are particularly well developed on the tails and backs of sexually mature females.

== Taxonomy ==
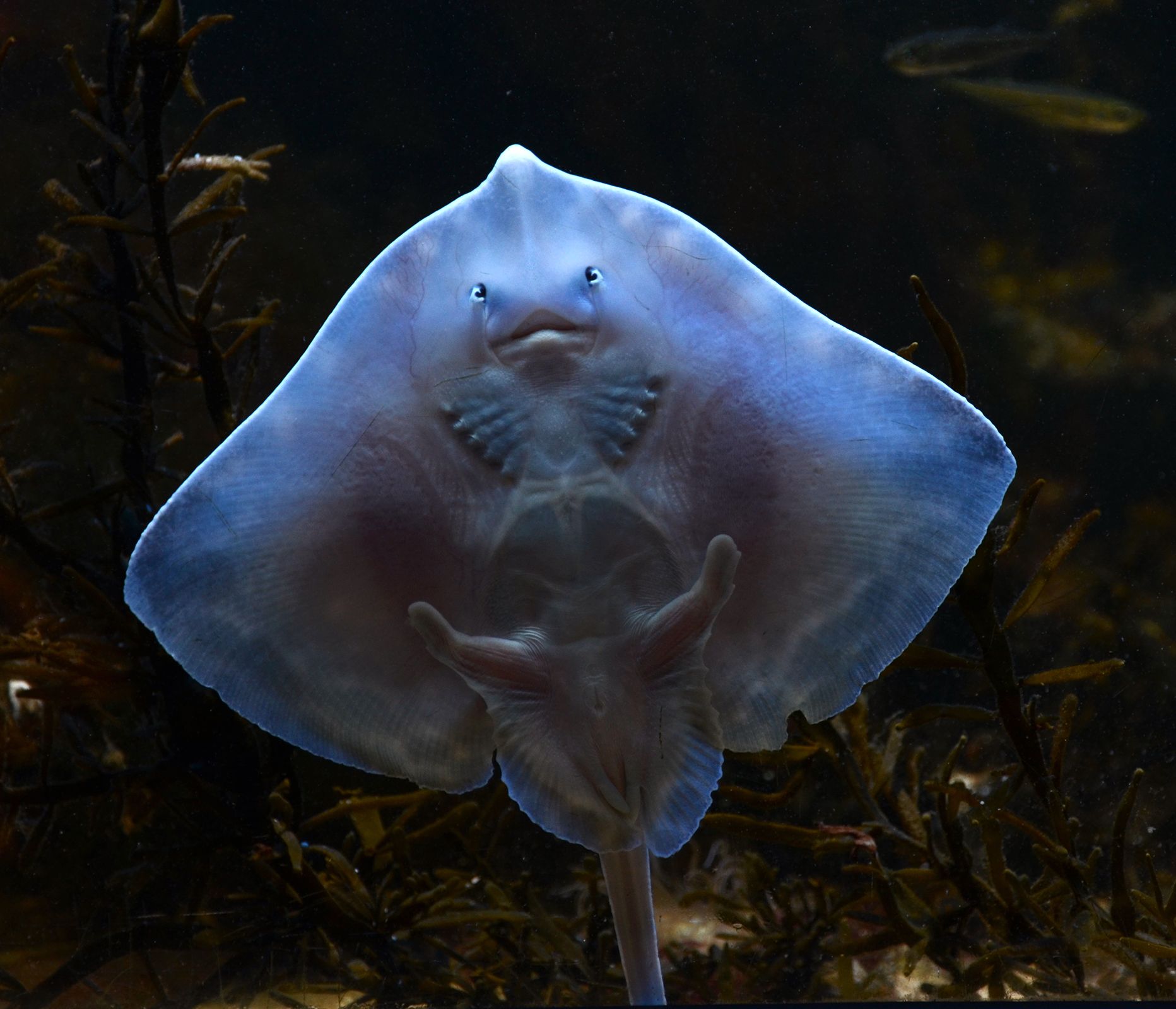
Raja clavata at the Aquarium de Vannes.

Raja clavata, the thornback ray (or thornback skate, roker), was named by Carl Linnaeus in the 10th edition of Systema Naturae in 1758, in the genus Raja of the Order Rajiformes in the Family Rajidae.

It is one of about 13 species of skate (family Rajidae) that are known from the North Sea and adjacent Atlantic waters.

=== Common names ===
Common names include:

- Danish — Sømrokke.
- Dutch — Stekelrog.
- English — Roker / Thornback ray / Dorn.
- Estonian — Astelrai.
- Faeroese — Naglaskøta.
- Finnish — Okarausku.
- French — Raie bouclée.
- German — Nagelrochen.
- Icelandic — Dröfnuskata.
- Latvian — Dzelkņraja.
- Norwegian — Piggskate.
- Polish — Raja nabijana a. ciernista.
- Portuguese — Raia lenga / Raia brocheada
- Russian — Колючий скат.
- Spanish — Raya de clavos.
- Swedish — Knaggrocka.

== Morphometrics ==
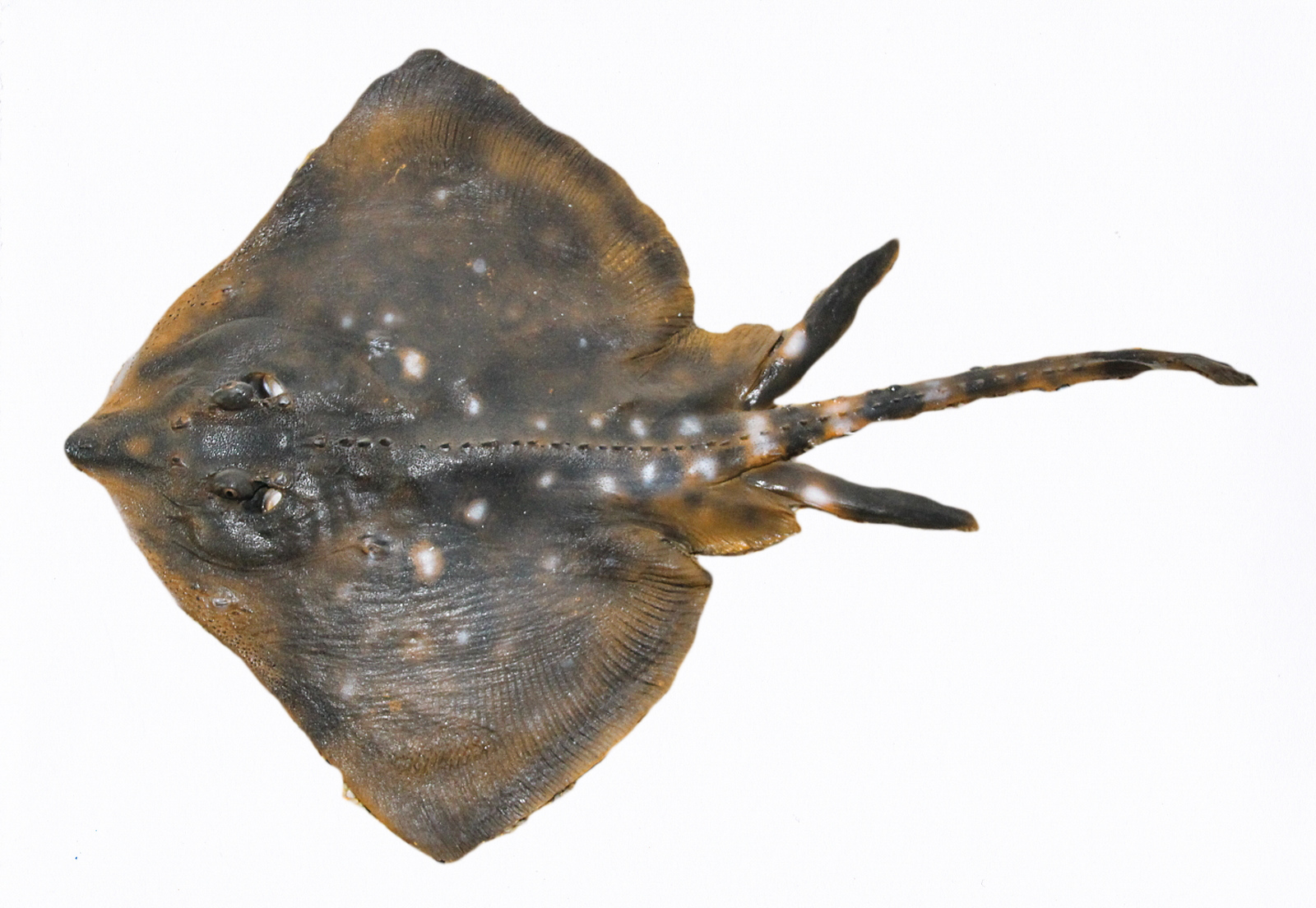
Top side view of a thornback ray on a white background.

Dorsal spines : 0; Anal spines: 0; Anal soft rays: 0. ; disc-width 1.25 to 1.36 times its length, its length 1.70 to 1.83 times its total length; pectoral fins with clear angles on lateral side; triangular pelvic fins. Dorsally prickly; large females also prickly throughout their ventral surface; young and large males prickly along the borders of their discs and the underside of their snout. 30–50 thorns form a median row from the nape to the first dorsal fin; additional large 'buckler' thorns with swollen bases scattered on upper surface of disc in adults. Max length : 105 cm male/unsexed; 139.0 cm (female); common length : 85.0 cm; max. weight: 18.0 kg.

== Life cycle ==
Thornback rays are an oviparous and polyandrous species. Paired eggs are laid and deposited on shallow sand, mud, pebble or gravel bottoms . Up to 170 egg cases can be laid by a single female in a year, average fecundity around 48–74 eggs. In northwestern Europe, egg cases are laid during spring, and in the Mediterranean during winter and spring. Egg cases are oblong capsules with stiff pointed horns at the corners, each containing one embryo. Capsules are 5.0–9.0 cm long without the horns and 3.4–6.8 cm wide. Egg cases are anchored with an adhesive film.

Embryos feed solely on yolk. Egg cases hatch after about 4–5 months and pups are about 11–13 cm.

Mating season is from February to September, peaking in June. Adults observed to form same-sex aggregations during the mating season with females moving to shallower inshore waters approximately a month before the males. Mating does not occur in the Baltic Sea. This is one of the fish used by the marine leech Pontobdella muricata as a host.

Thornback rays reach maturity at between 7-8 years old, and have a maximum known age of 15 years.

British Isles population

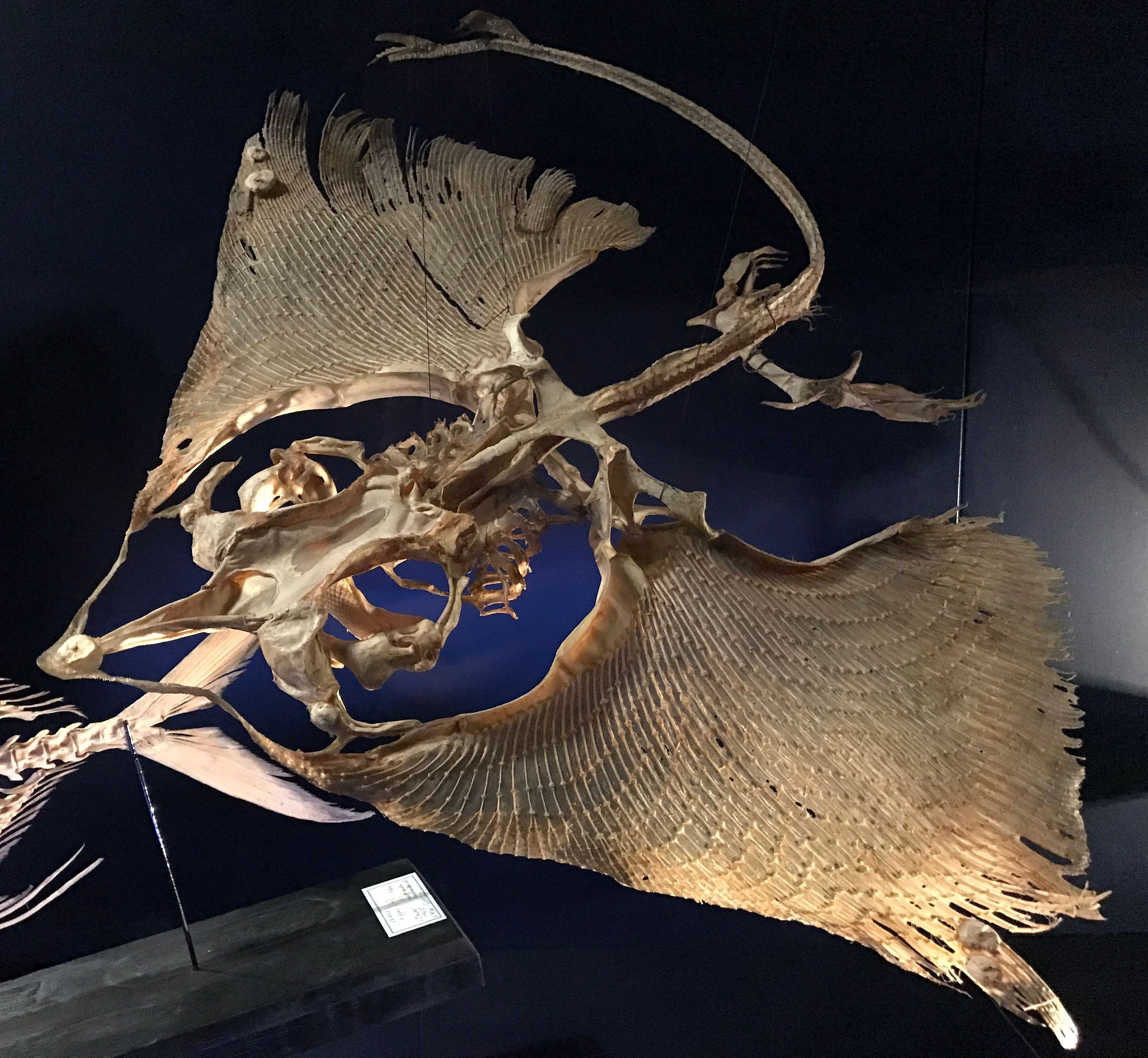
Skeletal mount

A search about the growth and maturation of Raja clavata in the Solway Firth (part of the border between Cumbria, England and Dumfries and Galloway, Scotland) shows that the males and females appear to mature at 42 and 45 cm in disc width respectively. The Solway population is heavily exploited by an unrestricted commercial fishery and a considerable proportion (48.6%) of the retained catch is immature. It is suggested that fishing pressure has brought about a reduction in the size at which female fish mature.

== See also ==
- Fish of the Atlantic Ocean
- Fish of the Mediterranean Sea
