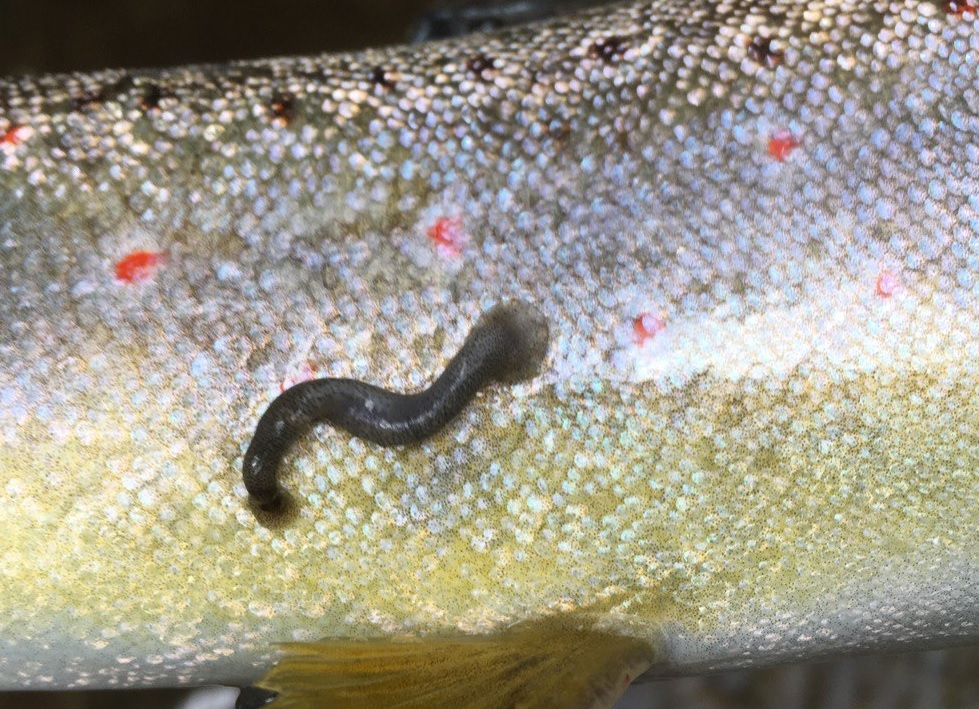
- Piscicola geometra on a trout (Salmo trutta fario)

Scientific classification
- Kingdom: Animalia
- Phylum: Annelida
- Clade: Pleistoannelida
- Clade: Sedentaria
- Class: Clitellata
- Subclass: Hirudinea
- Infraclass: Euhirudinea
- Order: Rhynchobdellida
- Family: Piscicolidae; Johnston, 1865

Subfamilies
- Piscicolinae Johnston, 1865; Platybdellinae Epshtein, 1970; Pontobdellinae Llewellyn, 1966

= Piscicolidae =

Family of annelid worms

The Piscicolidae are a family of jawless leeches in the order Rhynchobdellida that are parasitic on fish. They occur in both freshwater and seawater, have cylindrical bodies, and typically have a large, bell-shaped, anterior sucker with which they cling to their host. Some of the leeches in this family have external gills, outgrowths of the body wall projecting laterally, the only group of leeches to exchange gases in this way.

Worldwide, around 60 genera and 100 species of leeches are in this family, all parasitic on the blood of marine, estuarine, and freshwater fishes. These leeches are less common in the tropics, and more abundant in temperate and polar waters.

== Taxonomy ==
Historically, the Piscicolidae have been divided into three subfamilies: the Pontobdellinae, characterised by two pairs of pulsatile vesicles on each urosome segment; the Piscicolinae, characterised by a single pair of pulsatile vesicles on each urosome segment; and the Platybdellinae, with no pulsatile vesicles. However, molecular phylogenetic analyses performed by Williams and Burreson in 2006, do not support these subdivisions. The Piscicolidae were confirmed as being monophyletic, but the Platybdellinae were shown to be polyphyletic with four distinct clades, and the Piscicolinae were similarly polyphyletic, again with four distinct clades, and the Pontobdellinae were paraphyletic with respect to the genus Oxytonostoma.

== Ecology ==
The Piscicolidae are parasitic on the blood of fishes. They produce a variety of anticoagulants to help them drink blood freely. Some species are host-specific, while others can accept a larger range of hosts. Some, such as the European Piscicola geometra, take a blood meal and then drop off the host and hide somewhere while they digest the blood; some, mostly in marine or estuarine habitats with soft substrates, attach themselves temporarily to a crustacean after leaving their fish host; others remain attached to a fish semipermanently. Leeches are hermaphrodites, and mating may take place on or off the fish host, but in either case, the cocoon, usually containing a single egg, is deposited elsewhere, usually stuck to a stone or piece of vegetation, or even to the carapace of a crustacean. When the egg hatches, the juvenile leech has about a week to find a suitable fish host for itself.

== Genera ==
The World Register of Piscicolidae Species lists the following 71 genera:

- Acipenserobdella Epshtein, 1969
- Aestabdella Burreson, 1976
- Alexandrobdella Bolotov, Klass, Konopleva, Bespalaya, Gofarov, Kondakov et Vikhrev, 2020
- Ambulobdella Utevsky et Utevsky, 2018
- Antarcticobdella Dollfus, 1965
- Austrobdella Badham, 1916
- Austroplatybdellina A. Utevsky, S. Utevsky, Cichocka, Bielecki et Trontelj, 2023
- Baicalobdella Dogiel et Bogolepova, 1957
- Bathybdella Burreson, 1981
- Bdellamaris Richardson, 1953
- Beringobdella Caballero, 1974
- Branchellion Savigny, 1822
- Brumptiana Llewellyn et Knight-Jones, 1984
- Calliobdella van Beneden et Hesse, 1863
- Caspiobdella Epshtein, 1966
- Ceratobdella Utevsky et Gordeev, 2015
- Codonobdella Grube, 1873
- Cottobdella Utevsky, 1997
- Crangonobdella Selensky, 1914
- Cryobdella Harding, 1922
- Cryobdellina Brinkmann, 1948
- Cyrillobdella Leigh-Sharpe, 1933
- Cystobranchus Diesing, 1859
- Dolichobdella Utevsky et Chernyshev, 2012
- Dollfusobdella Burreson et Williams, 2008
- Galatheabdella Richardson et Meyer, 1973
- Ganymedebdella Leigh-Sharpe, 1915
- Glyptonotobdella Sawyer et White, 1969
- Gonimosobdella Williams & Burreson, 2005
- Hemibdella van Beneden et Hesse, 1863
- Heptacyclus Vasileyev, 1939
- Ichthyobdella Blainville, 1827
- Italobdella Bielecki, 1993
- Janusion Leigh-Sharpe, 1933
- Johanssonia Selensky, 1914
- Leporinabdella Burreson et Williams, 2008
- Limnotrachelobdella Epshtein, 1968
- Lizabdella A. Utevsky, 2007
- Makarabdella Richardson, 1959
- Malmiana Strand, 1942
- Marsipobdella Moore, 1952
- Megaliobdella Meyer et Burreson, 1990
- Mooreobdellina Epshtein, 1972
- Mysidobdella Selensky, 1927
- Myzobdella Leidy, 1851
- Notobdella Benham, 1909
- Notostomum Levinsen, 1882
- Nototheniobdella A. Utevsky, 1993
- Oceanobdella Caballero, 1956
- Orientobdella Epstein, 1962
- Ostreobdella Oka, 1927
- Oxytonostoma Malm, 1863
- Pawlowskiella Bielecki, 1997
- Phyllobdella Moore, 1939
- Phyllobdellina Epstein et Utevsky, 1993
- Phyllobranchus Girard, 1851
- Piscicola Blainville, 1818
- Piscicolaria Whitman, 1889
- Platybdella Malm, 1863
- Pleurobdella Utevsky, 1995
- Pontobdella Leach, 1815
- Pontobdellina Harding, 1927
- Pterobdella Kaburaki, 1921
- Pterobdellina Boisen Bennike et Bruun, 1939
- Richardsonobdella Burreson et Dybdahl, 1989
- Stibarobdella Leigh-Sharpe, 1925
- Taimenobdella Epshtein, 1969
- Trachelobdella Diesing, 1850
- Trachelobdellina Moore, 1957
- Trulliobdella Brinkman, 1947
- Zeylanicobdella Silva, 1963
