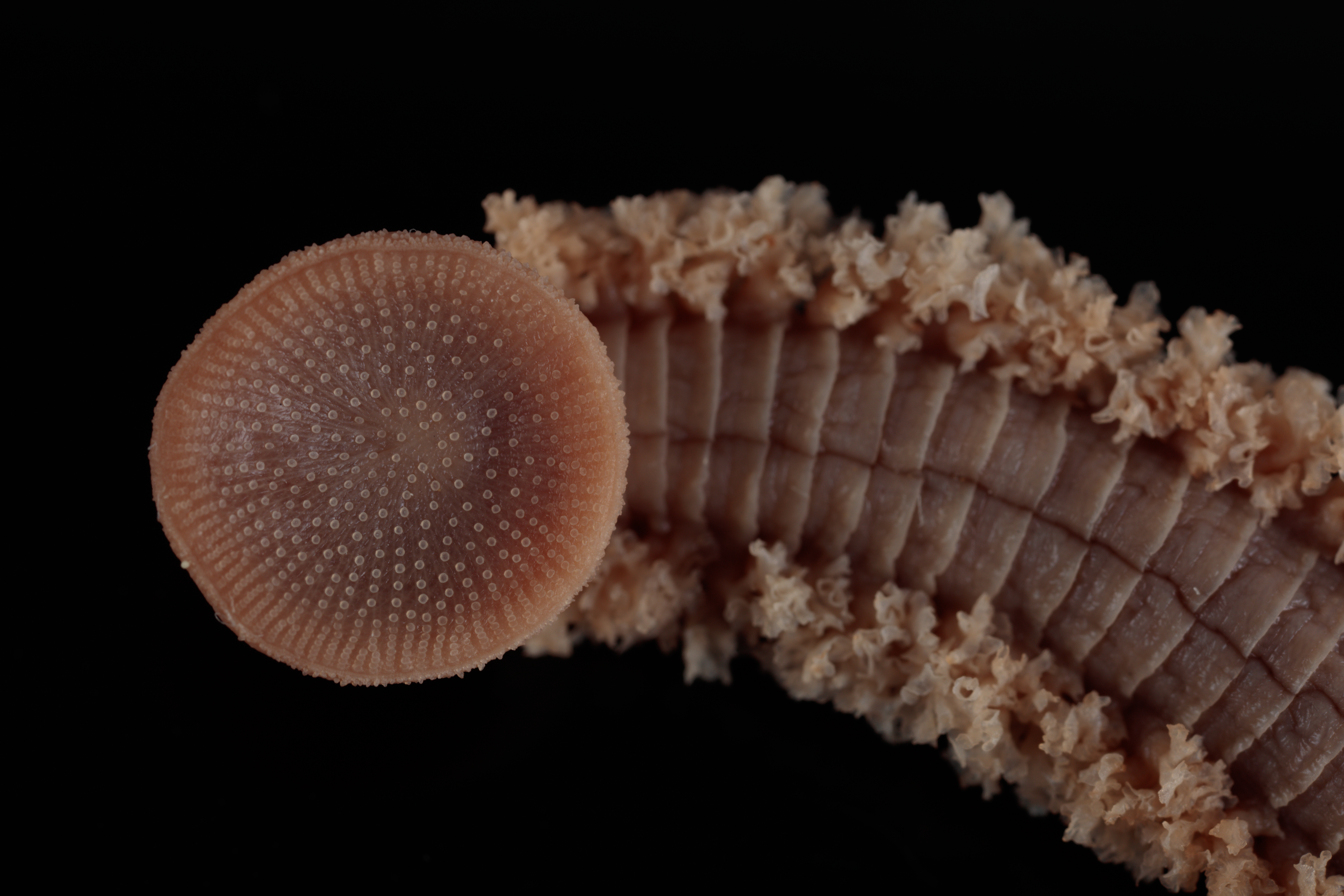
- Branchellion parkeri

Scientific classification
- Kingdom: Animalia
- Phylum: Annelida
- Clade: Pleistoannelida
- Clade: Sedentaria
- Class: Clitellata
- Subclass: Hirudinea
- Infraclass: Euhirudinea
- Order: Rhynchobdellida; Blanchard, 1893

Families
- Glossiphoniidae; Ozobranchidae (disputed, see text); Piscicolidae

= Rhynchobdellida =

Jawless leeches

Order of annelids

Rhynchobdellida (from the Greek rhynchos, mouth, and bdellein, sucking), the jawless leeches or freshwater leeches, are an order of aquatic leeches. Despite the common name "freshwater leeches", species are found in both sea and fresh water. They are defined by the presence of a protrusible proboscis instead of jaws, and having colourless blood. They move by "inchworming" and are found worldwide. The order contains 110 species, divided into 41 genera and three families. Members of the order range widely in length, usually between 7 and 40 mm. They are hermaphrodite. The order is not monophyletic.

== Appearance and eating habits ==
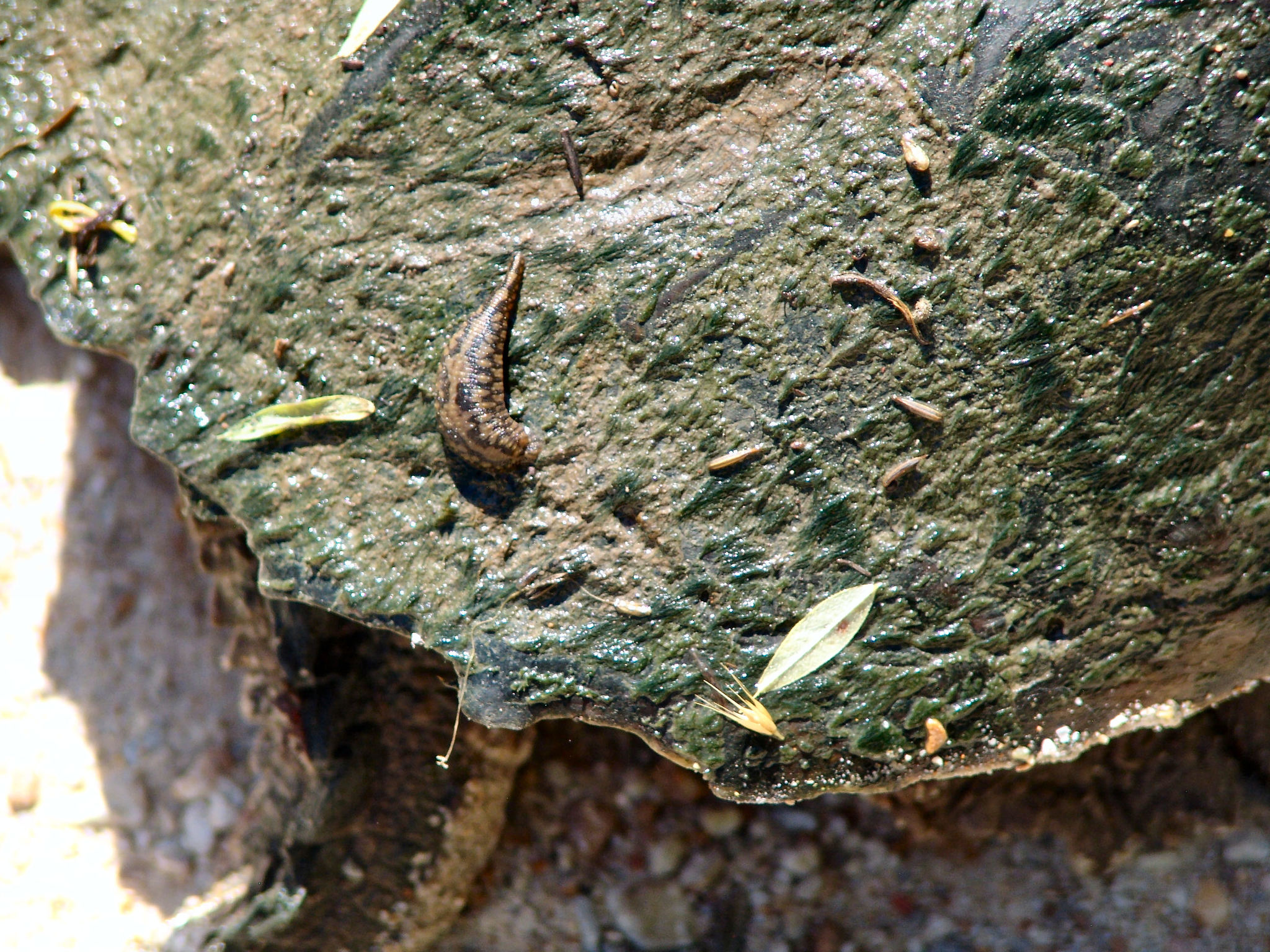
Glossiphoniidae: Smooth Turtle Leech (Placobdella parisitica) on a snapping turtle shell. (Southern United States)

Instead of jaws and teeth, Rhynchobdellidae have protrusible proboscises, which they use to penetrate the host's skin. Mouths of Rhynchobdellidae species are small holes from which the proboscis can be protruded. The proboscis then sucks out the desired bodily fluid from the host: usually blood or coelomic fluid in the case of invertebrate victims.

Rhynchobdellidae are either sanguivorous or predatory. Sanguivorous species usually feed on a variety of other animals, using their proboscis to host's skin. They generate anticoagulants (like mosquitoes) and natural anaesthesia to help the feeding. Predatory Rhynchobdellidae have digestive enzymes that help break down their prey, which usually consists of small invertebrates such as insect larvae or amphipods.

== Families ==
=== Glossiphoniidae (Freshwater jawless leeches) ===
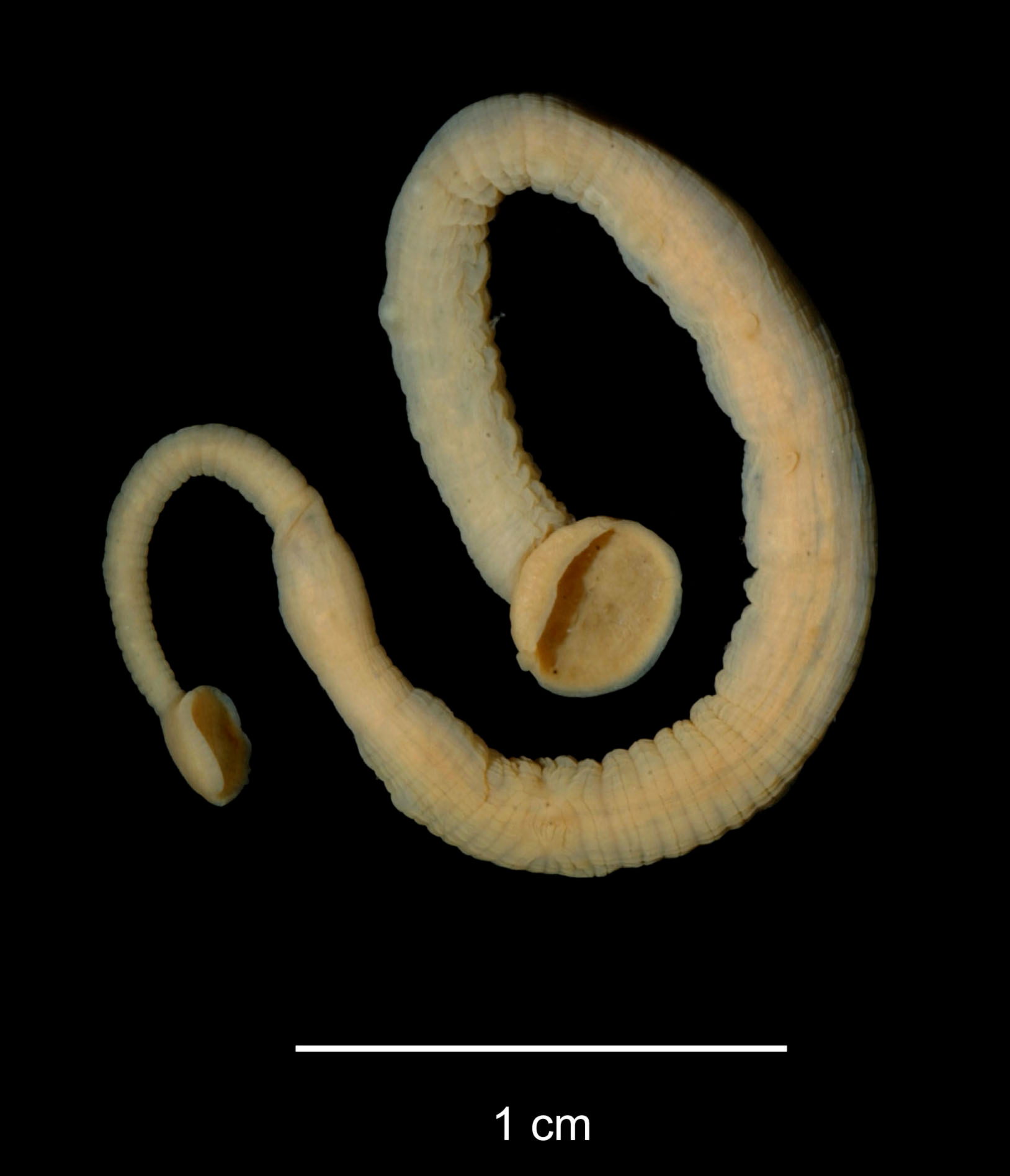
Piscicolidae: Trachelobdella lubrica is a parasite of fish.

The Glossiphoniidae, the freshwater jawless leeches, or leaf leeches (due to their shape) are freshwater leeches, flattened, and with a poorly defined anterior sucker. The family Glossiphoniidae contains one of the world's largest species of leech, the giant Amazon leech, which can grow up to 45 cm in length. Many species show extended parental care, keeping eggs in nests or pouches and caring for and feeding the young. They feed on both vertebrate and invertebrate animals.

=== Piscicolidae (Fish leeches) ===
The Piscicolidae occur in both freshwater and seawater, have cylindrical bodies, and a usually well-marked, bell-shaped, anterior sucker. They are parasites of fish. The family was originally divided into three subfamilies based on species' pulsatile vesicles, but the subfamilies were disbanded in 2006.

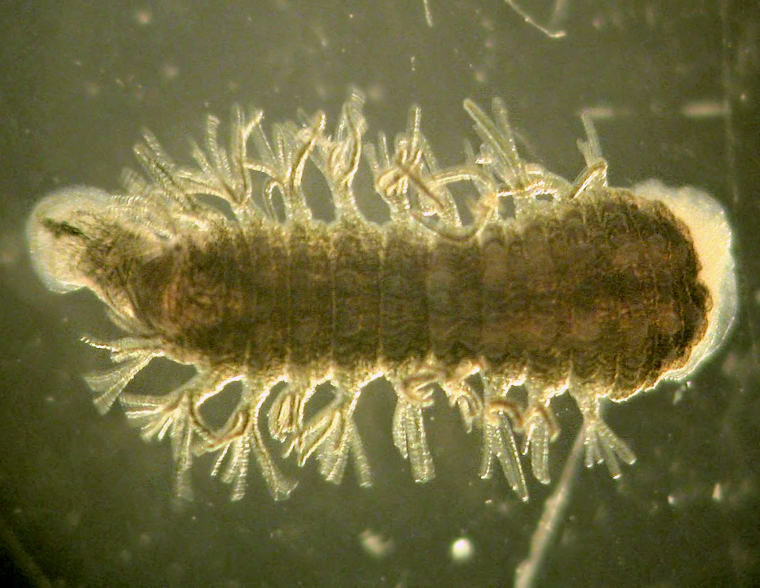
Ozobranchidae: Ozobranchus jantseanus (dorsal view)

=== Ozobranchidae (Turtle leeches) ===
Ozobranchidae are primarily parasitic on marine turtles, and are sometimes merged with the Piscicolidae.

== See also ==
- Arhynchobdellida
- Parasitism
