= List of schools in the Czech Republic =

This is a list of private schools in the Czech Republic.

== Pardubice Region ==
- Upper Secondary Industrial School of Chemistry

== Karlovy Vary Region ==
- Carlsbad International School

== Moravian-Silesian Region ==
- 1st International School of Ostrava
- Beskydy Mountain Academy
- Juliusz Słowacki Polish Grammar School

== Olomouc Region ==
- Soukromé gymnázium Olomouc

== Prague ==
- Ambis University
- Brno International Business School
- The English College in Prague
- English International School, Prague
- Gymnázium Christiana Dopplera
- Gymnázium Jana Keplera
- International School of Prague
- College of Fashion Design and Secondary School of Fashion
- Jan Neruda Grammar School
- Lauder Schools of Prague
- Park Lane International School
- Prague British School
- Christian International School of Prague
- Gymnázium PORG Libeň

== South Bohemian Region ==
- Townshend International School

== Ústí nad Labem Region ==
- Gymnasium Kadaň

== See also ==
- Education in the Czech Republic
- List of universities in the Czech Republic
