= Ester Weimerová =

Czech politician and psychologist (born 1999)

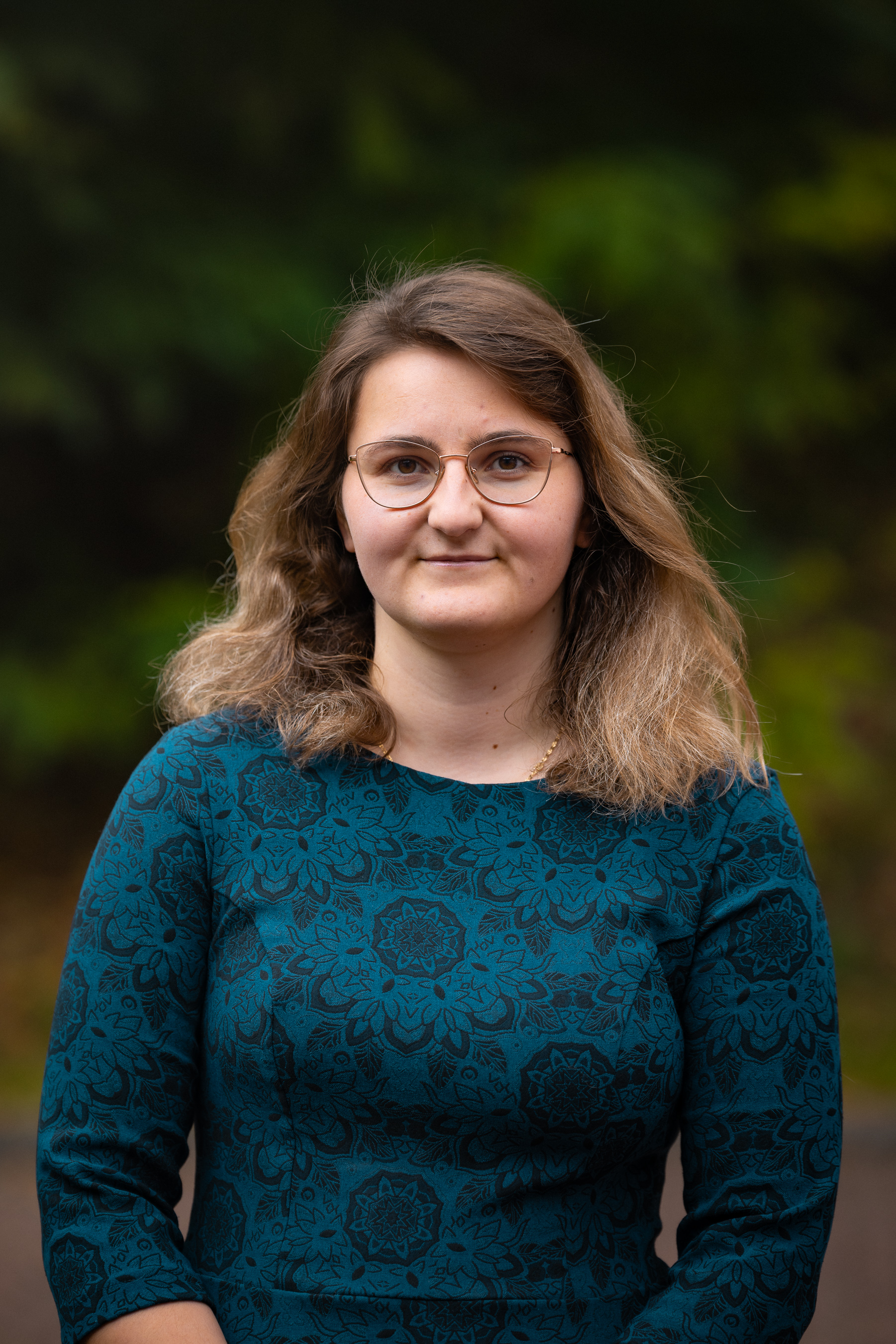

Member of the Chamber of Deputies
- Incumbent
- Assumed office 4 October 2025
- Constituency: Moravian-Silesian Region

Personal details
- Born: 19 June 1999 (age 27) Ostrava, Czech Republic
- Party: STAN (since 2020)
- Education: University of New York in Prague; State University of New York

Ester Weimerová (born 19 June 1999) is a Czech politician serving as a member of the Chamber of Deputies since 2025 as a member of the Mayors and Independents (STAN) movement. She also works as a health psychologist.

== Personal life ==
Weimerová graduated from the 1st International School of Ostrava gymnasium, then from the University of New York in Prague (master's degree) in psychology and the Institute of Postgraduate Education in Health Care (specialization in clinical psychology and AKK psychologist in health care). She then graduated from Empire State College at the State University of New York with a bachelor's degree in human development with a focus on psychology. She also attended bachelor's studies in Mathematics at the Faculty of Mathematics and Physics of Charles University in Prague (and Czech studies as part of a joint study at the Faculty of Arts) before.

Weimerová lives in Dobrá. She works as a health psychologist at the Havířov hospital. Since 2020, she has also been an organizer of demonstrations, commemorative events and happenings of Million Moments for Democracy in Frýdek-Místek.

== Political activity ==
She has been involved in the Mayors and Independents movement since 2020. In 2022–2025, she served as the regional chairwoman of the Young Mayors (mSTAN) in the Moravian-Silesian Region, having previously served briefly as the vice-chairwoman of this regional organization. In the regional elections in 2024, she ran as a member of the STAN movement for the Moravian-Silesian Region Assembly on the candidate list of the "MAYORS AND PERSONALITIES FOR THE REGION" coalition of Mayors and Independents (STAN) & Personalities for the Region (OK), but was unsuccessful.

In the elections to the Chamber of Deputies of the Czech Republic in 2025, she ran in 9th place as a candidate for the STAN movement in the Moravian-Silesian Region. She received 3,913 preferential votes, jumped to 2nd place and became an MP.
