= Jagiellonian College =

Private university in Poland

- Akademia Jagiellońska w Toruniu
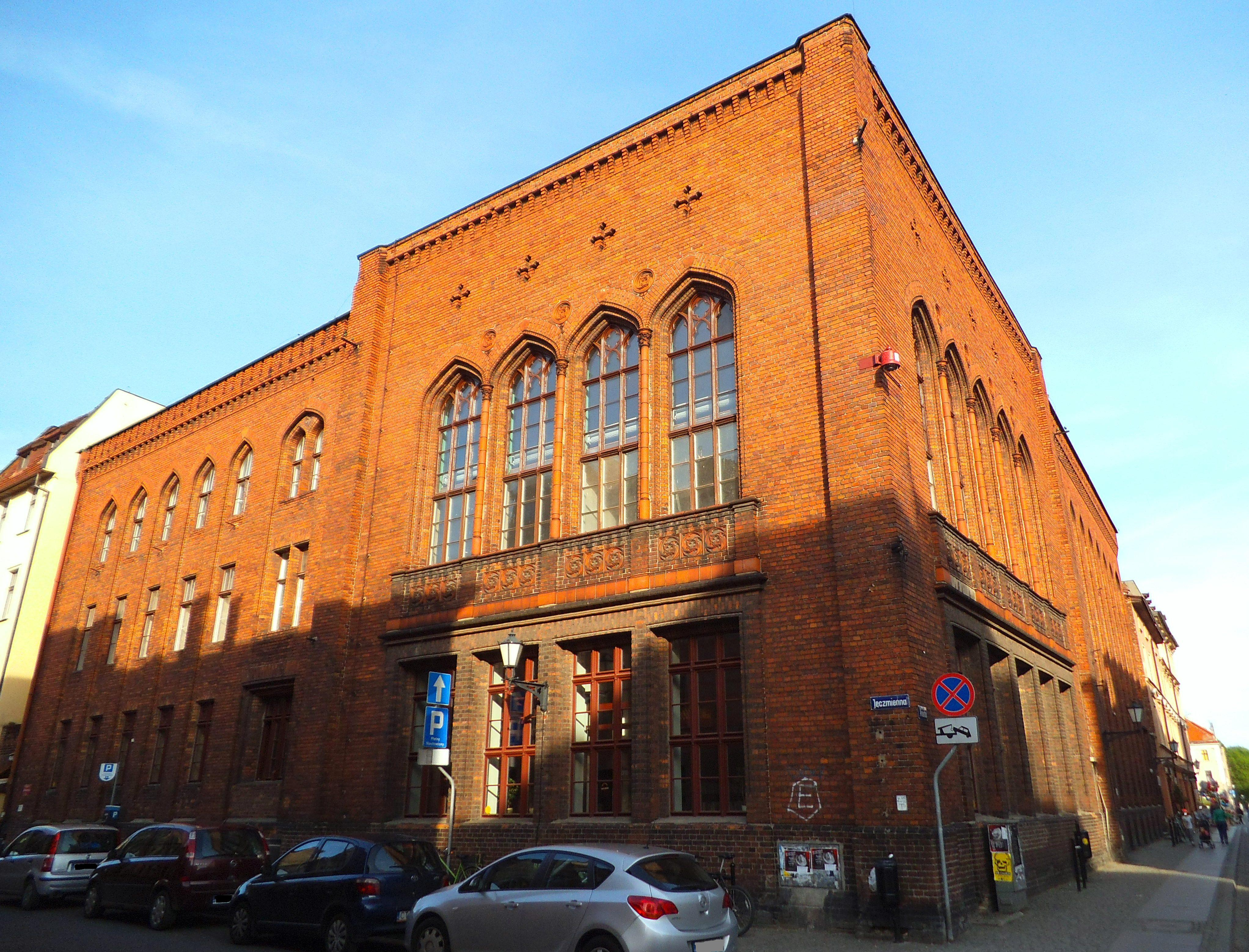
- Other name: Vysoká škola Jagiellońská v Toruni.
- Type: Private
- Accreditation: Higher Education Institution: University (B+ Quality Level)
- Chancellor: mec. Elżbieta Górska
- Rector: Joanna Górska-Szymczak
- Location: Toruń, Poland
- Campus: Urban/College town
- Website: www.akademiajagiellonska.pl
- Foreign Faculty: Faculty of Administration and Economic Studies in Uherské Hradiště, Akademia Jagiellońska w Toruniu

The Jagiellonian College (Polish: Akademia Jagiellońska w Toruniu) is a private university in Toruń, Poland. It was established in 2003 and registered by the Ministry of Science and Higher Education under number 281. In February 2022, university received the status of an academy and took its current name.

The institution puts an emphasis on the departments of law, social and educational sciences. Akademia Jagiellońska w Toruniu and its faculties in the Czech Republic scored a German Anabin rating of H+, which only signals that the institution is accredited in Poland. The Akademia Jagiellońska w Toruniu also ranked 8th in the commercially sponsored Perspektywy ranking of universities in Poland 2023.

== Authorities ==
- Rector – Dr. Joanna Górska-Szymczak
- Former Rector and now Associate Professor – Dr. hab. Grzegorz Górski
- Vice-Rector for Student Affairs – Dr. Eugeniusz Suwiński
- Vice-Rector for Scientific Affairs – Dr. Andrzej Potoczek

== Study programmes ==
- Undergraduate studies (First-cycle studies)
  - Administration
  - National security
  - Pedagogy
  - International relation
  - Informatics
- Graduate studies (Second-cycle studies)
  - Pedagogy
  - International relations Administration and economics

== Postgraduate studies ==
- Master of Business Administration (MBA)

The following postgraduate studies can only be completed at the faculty located in the Czech Republic:

- Bachelor of Business Administration (BBA)
- Master of Laws (LL.M.)

The completion of the MBA programme due to a legal change in 2017 entitles graduates to serve on the supervisory boards of companies of the State Ministry of Finance and municipal companies and institutions. This process has undergone severe criticism due to the Collegium Humanum scandal, whit Humanum degrees being shunned. Postgraduate Studies constitute an integral part of the academic diversity at Akademia Jagiellońska w Toruniu, offering a unique opportunity for international educational collaboration. Under the leadership of Prof. Oldřich Hájek, Ph.D., these study programs are offered in the Czech Republic at the Faculty of Administration and Economic Studies in Uherské Hradiště.

== Publishing ==
The university publishes the following scientific journals:

- The International Journal of Public Administration, Management and Economic Development (IJPAMED), ISSN 2533-4077, publishes original research covering empirical, theoretical, methodological and policy-relevant work in public administration, management and economic development. International Journal of Public Administration, Management and Economic Development is abstracted and indexed in the Directory of Research Journal Indexing, Index Copernicus, Google Scholar and ERIH PLUS.
- 21st Century Pedagogy (PED21), ISSN 2544-8986, is an international open-access peer-reviewed journal on pedagogy. The journal’s scope includes, but is not limited to the following areas of research: education, social rehabilitation, learning, school education, formal and informal education, tertiary and vocational education, higher education, systems of education, educational policy.
- Confrontation and Cooperation: 1000 Years of Polish-German-Russian Relations (CONC), ISSN 2391-5536, is a series of monographs on political relations between Poland, Germany and Russia. Since the beginning of their existence these neighboring countries had constantly entered interactions - historic conflicts, as well as periods of cooperation. Current relations of these countries are to high degree conditioned by historical experiences. The Journal's aim is to present analysis of mutual relations of Poland, Germany and Russia as contemporary situation in Europe is greatly determined by the relations between these countries.
- Law and Administration in Postsoviet Europe (LAPE), ISSN 2391-5544, is a series on law, public administration and politics in Europe since 1989. The Journal's aim is to present analysis of legal changes and experiences of Central and Eastern European countries since 1989.

== See also ==
- List of universities in Poland
- List of universities in the Czech Republic
