= List of universities in the Czech Republic =

This list of universities in the Czech Republic includes public, state, private and for-profit universities which exist in the Czech Republic.

== Partial list ==
=== Old universities ===
- Charles University in Prague – founded in 1348 by Bohemian king and Holy Roman Emperor Charles IV.
- Palacký University Olomouc (Olomouc University) – a college founded 1249 by Olomouc bishop, got university rights in 1573 when it was led by the Jesuit Order, in 18th century became state university. During oppressions of absolutism of the 1850s, most faculties were closed, only theological faculty remained. In 1946, other faculties were re-established.
- Czech Technical University in Prague (Bohemian Polytechnica; České vysoké učení technické) – founded in 1707 by Bohemian nobility to provide better technical knowledge. Many important scholars have taught there, e.g. F. J. Gerstner or J. Ressel.
- VSB – Technical University of Ostrava is a polytechnic university with a long history of high-quality engineering education and research was founded on 23 January 1849 in Příbram, moved to Ostrava in 1949.
- Brno University of Technology (BUT) (Vysoké učení technické v Brně, VUT) founded in 1849 as a German-Bohemian Technical College (Německo-české technické učiliště) and transformed into Czech Technical University (České vysoké učení technické) in 1899 with Karel Zahradníček as its first rector. In 1956 transformed into Brno University of Technology (Vysoké učení technické v Brně) and after the Velvet Revolution in 1989 reorganized and new faculties were founded.
- Czech University of Life Sciences Prague (Česká zemědělská univerzita v Praze, ČZU) founded with the charter for the agricultural department at the Czech Technical University in Prague October 1906 by Emperor Franz Josef, following a proposal by Gustav Marchet, Minister for Culture and Education. A government decree was passed in November 1952, establishing an independent University of Agriculture in Prague with the Faculties Agronomy, Economics and Mechanization. In the new millennium the university changed its name to Czech University of Life Sciences Prague (in English) with 5 faculties (Agrobiology, Food & Natural Resources, Economics & Management, Engineering, Environmental Sciences, Forestry, Wildlife & Wood Sciences) and 2 institutes (Tropics & Subtropics, Education & Communication).
- Masaryk University in Brno – founded in 1919 by the state. Became one of the biggest universities during the 1990s.
- Mendel University in Brno (Mendelova univerzita v Brně) – founded in 1919 named after Gregor Mendel, the botanist and the "Father of Genetics"
- Prague University of Economics and Business (Vysoká škola ekonomická v Praze, VŠE) founded in 1919 as Vysoká škola obchodní (the Commercial College) affiliated to Czech Technical University, and currently is the largest university in the field of economics, business and information technologies in the Czech Republic.

=== New universities ===
After 1989 most of separate faculties in regional cities became standalone universities. They usually bear name of the region. Technology universities in Ostrava, Plzeň and Liberec opened more faculties and branches of study, including humanities, and changed their names.

- University of Pardubice – founded in 1950 as the Chemistry College later for 40 years known as the Institute of Chemical Technology.
- University of West Bohemia – founded in 1990 (continuation of University of Mechanical and Electrotechnical Engineering, est. 1949 under ČVUT, independent 1953).
- University of South Bohemia in České Budějovice – founded in 1991.
- University of Ostrava – founded in 1991 (continuation of Higher School of Education, est. 1953).
- Jan Evangelista Purkyně University in Ústí nad Labem – founded in 1991. Purkyně was a biologist, one of the best Bohemian scholars of 19th century.
- University of Silesia, Opava – founded in 1991.
- Technical University of Liberec – founded 1994 (continuation of University of Mechanical and Textile Engineering, est. 1953).
- University of Hradec Králové – founded in 2000 (renamed in 2000, continuation of independent Faculty of Education, est. 1964).
- Tomas Bata University in Zlín – founded in 2001.

=== Historical universities ===
(Universities that no longer exist)

- Law University in Prague: established by separation of Law faculty of Prague University during the 1360s. In long-lasting religious wars in Bohemia (Hussite Wars, after 1420) Law University ended its being.
- Prague German University: because of both-sided language chauvinism between Prague Bohemians and Germans, the old Prague University was divided into two Universities of two languages in 1882. Important scholars have taught there, e.g. Albert Einstein, Christian von Ehrenfels or Hans Kelsen. In the 1930s University got slowly under Nazi influence (rector Mariano San Nicolò). In 1945, University was closed by government.
- Russian Free University in Prague: this University was established in the 1920s and financed by Government of Czechoslovakia to help Russian emigrants who fled before Bolsheviks from their home country. The university was closed by the German occupiers in 1939 and by second time in 1945 by the new leftist government. Many Russian professors and other Russian emigrees, citizens of Czechoslovakia, were kidnapped to Soviet Russia by NKVD in 1945.
- Ukrainian Free School in Prague: this university school was established in the 1920s for Ukrainians who fled before Bolsheviks. School followed the end of Russian Free University, many Ukrainian emigres were also kidnapped by NKVD.

== Comprehensive list ==
This is a list of all universities in the Czech Republic as of July 2019. It also includes small ones.

=== Public ===
- Academy of Performing Arts in Prague (Akademie múzických umění v Praze, AMU)
- Academy of Fine Arts, Prague (Akademie výtvarných umění v Praze, AVU)
- Czech Technical University in Prague (České vysoké učení technické v Praze, ČVUT)
- Czech University of Life Sciences Prague (Česká zemědělská univerzita v Praze, ČZU)
- Janáček Academy of Music and Performing Arts (Janáčkova akademie múzických umění, JAMU)
- University of South Bohemia in České Budějovice (Jihočeská univerzita v Českých Budějovicích, JČU)
- Masaryk University (Masarykova univerzita v Brně, MU)
- Mendel University in Brno (Mendelova univerzita v Brně, MENDELU)
- University of Ostrava (Ostravská univerzita v Ostravě, OU)
- Silesian University (Opava) (Slezská univerzita v Opavě, SU)
- Technical University of Liberec (Technická univerzita v Liberci, TUL)
- University of Hradec Králové (Univerzita Hradec Králové, UHK)
- Jan Evangelista Purkyně University in Ústí nad Labem (Univerzita Jana Evangelisty Purkyně v Ústí nad Labem, UJEP)
- Charles University in Prague (Univerzita Karlova v Praze, UK)
- Palacký University of Olomouc (Univerzita Palackého v Olomouci, UP)
- University of Pardubice (Univerzita Pardubice, UPA)
- Tomas Bata University in Zlín (Univerzita Tomáše Bati ve Zlíně, UTB)
- University of Veterinary and Pharmaceutical Sciences, Brno (Veterinární a farmaceutická univerzita v Brně, VFU)
- Technical University of Ostrava (Vysoká škola báňská – Technická univerzita Ostrava, VŠB – TUO)
- University of Economics, Prague (Vysoká škola ekonomická v Praze, VŠE)
- University of Chemistry and Technology (Vysoká škola chemicko-technologická v Praze, VŠCHT)
- College of Polytechnics Jihlava (Vysoká škola polytechnická Jihlava, VŠPJ)
- Institute of Technology and Business (Vysoká škola technická a ekonomická v Českých Budějovicích, VŠTE)
- Academy of Arts, Architecture and Design in Prague (Vysoká škola uměleckoprůmyslová v Praze, VŠUP)
- Brno University of Technology (Vysoké učení technické v Brně, VUT)
- University of West Bohemia (Západočeská univerzita v Plzni, ZČU)

=== State ===
- Police Academy (Policejní akademie České Republiky)
- University of Defence (Univerzita obrany) in Brno, Vyškov and Hradec Králové.

=== Private ===
- Anglo-American University
- Akademia Jagiellońska w Toruniu
- Collegium Humanum – Warsaw Management University
- Jan Amos Komensky University
- University of New York in Prague, s.r.o.
- New York University - NYU Prague
- Škoda Auto University
- International Prague University
- AMBIS University
- CEVRO Institute
- European Academy of education (Evropská akademmie vzdělávání)
- Metropolitan University Prague
- Institute of Hospitality Management in Prague

=== For-profit private ===
- Architectural Institute in Prague
- Newton University (Vysoká škola Newton)
- Prague City University
- Unicorn College
- The University of Finance and Administration
- University of International and Public Relations Prague

== See also ==
- Education in the Czech Republic
- List of colleges and universities by country
- List of colleges and universities
- List of schools in the Czech Republic
