= GCHD =

GCHD may refer to:

- Galveston County Health District
- Gymnázium Christiana Dopplera
