= Dobrá (Frýdek-Místek District) =

- Municipality
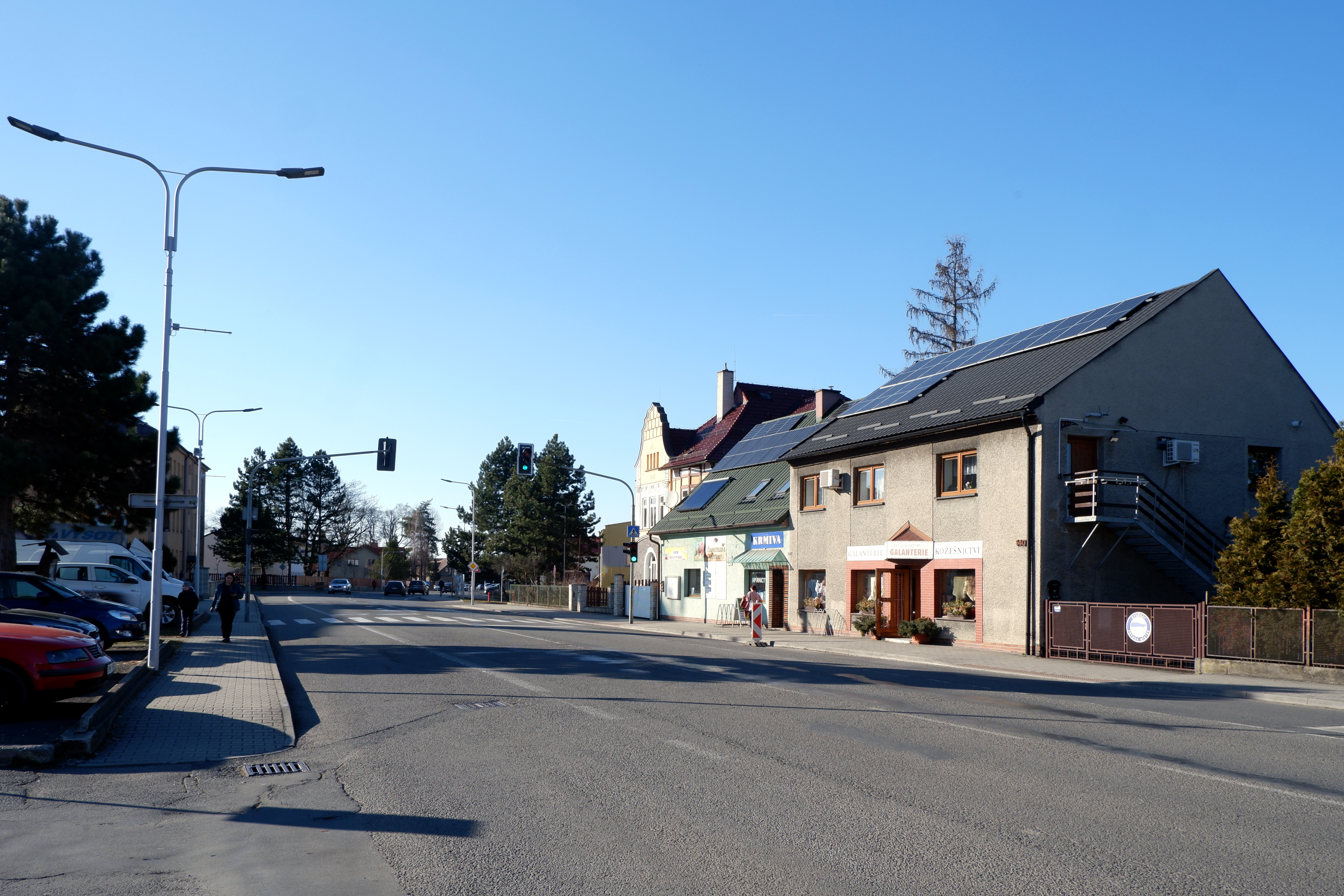
- Main street

- Flag Coat of arms

- Location in the Czech Republic
- Coordinates: 49°40′26″N 18°24′50″E
- Country: Czech Republic
- Region: Moravian-Silesian
- District: Frýdek-Místek
- First mentioned: 1305

Area
  - Total: 8.73 km^{2} (3.37 sq mi)
- Elevation: 332 m (1,089 ft)

Population (2026-01-01)
  - Total: 3,268
  - Density: 374/km^{2} (970/sq mi)
- Time zone: UTC+1 (CET)
  - Summer (DST): UTC+2 (CEST)
- Postal code: 739 51
- Website: www.dobra.cz

Dobrá (Czech pronunciation: [ˈdobraː]; Polish: Dobra, German: Dobrau) is a municipality and village in Frýdek-Místek District in the Moravian-Silesian Region of the Czech Republic. It has about 3,300 inhabitants.

== Geography ==
Dobrá is located about 3 kilometres (2 mi) east of Frýdek-Místek and 17 km (11 mi) southeast of Ostrava, in the historical region of Cieszyn Silesia. It lies in the Moravian-Silesian Foothills. The highest point is the hill Dobrá at 385 m (1,263 ft) above sea level. The municipality is situated on the right bank of the Morávka River.

== History ==
The settlement was first mentioned in a Latin document of Diocese of Wrocław called Liber fundationis episcopatus Vratislaviensis from around 1305 as Dobroczemicza. The creation of the village was a part of a larger settlement campaign taking place in the late 13th century on the territory of what will be later known as Upper Silesia.

Politically the village belonged initially to the Duchy of Teschen, formed in 1290 in the process of feudal fragmentation of Poland and was ruled by a local branch of Piast dynasty. In 1327 the duchy became a fee of Kingdom of Bohemia, which after 1526 became part of the Habsburg monarchy.

The village became a seat of a Catholic parish, mentioned in the register of Peter's Pence payment from 1447 among 50 parishes of Teschen deaconry as Dobersey.

In 1573 it was sold as one of 16 villages and the town of Friedeck and formed a state country split from the Duchy of Teschen.

After World War I and fall of Austria-Hungary, it became a part of Czechoslovakia. In March 1939, it became a part of Protectorate of Bohemia and Moravia. After World War II it was restored to Czechoslovakia.

== Demographics ==
Historical population

Year	Pop.	±%
1869	1,586	—
1880	1,829	+15.3%
1890	1,783	−2.5%
1900	1,892	+6.1%
1910	2,069	+9.4%

Year	Pop.	±%
1921	2,021	−2.3%
1930	2,493	+23.4%
1950	2,568	+3.0%
1961	2,828	+10.1%
1970	2,852	+0.8%

Year	Pop.	±%
1980	2,997	+5.1%
1991	2,863	−4.5%
2001	2,931	+2.4%
2011	3,012	+2.8%
2021	3,049	+1.2%

Source: Censuses

== Transport ==
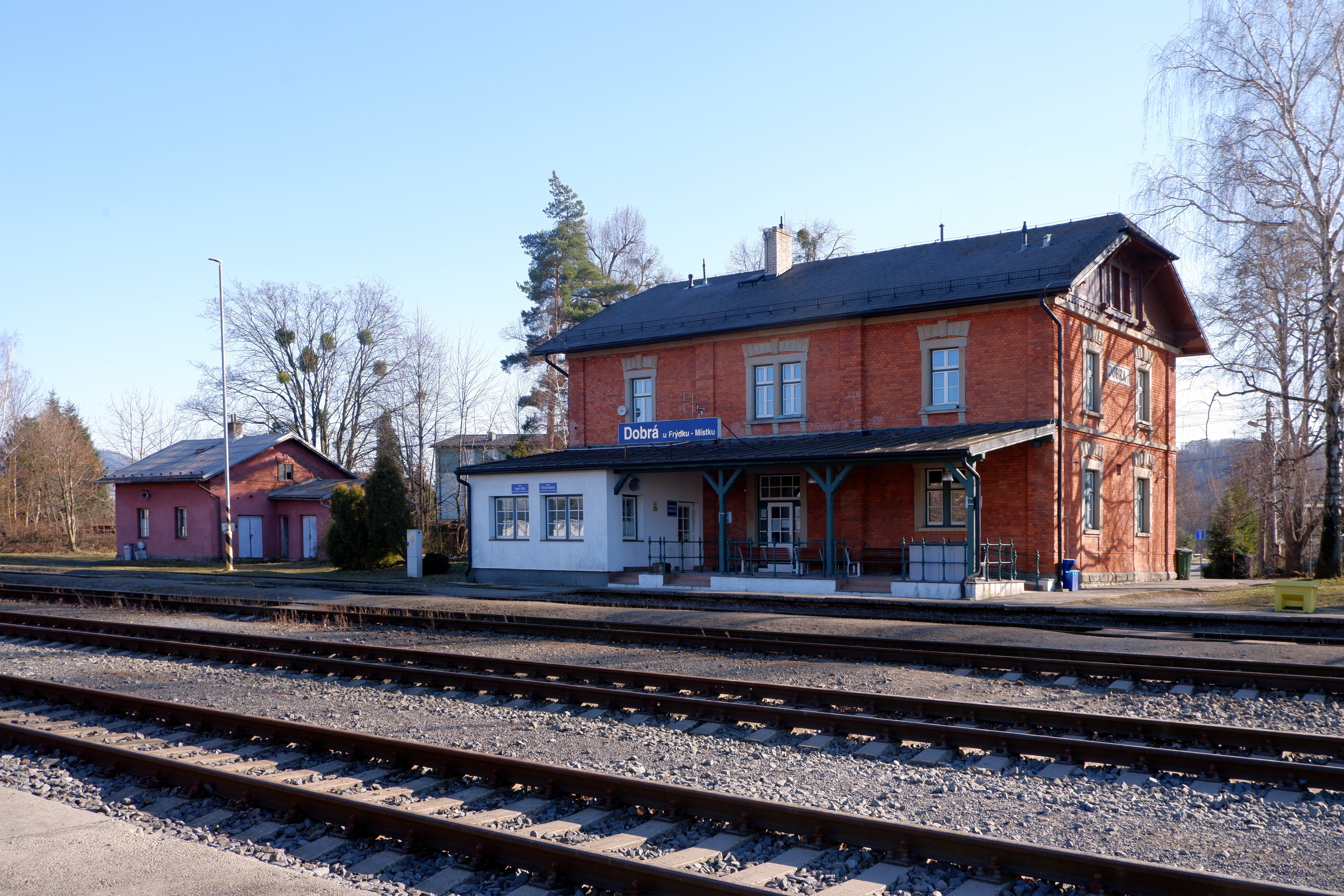
Dobrá u Frýdku-Místku railway station

The D48 motorway (part of the European route E462) from Frýdek-Místek to Český Těšín runs through the municipality.

The Dobrá u Frýdku-Místku station is located on the railway line from Frýdek-Místek to Cieszyn.

== Sights ==
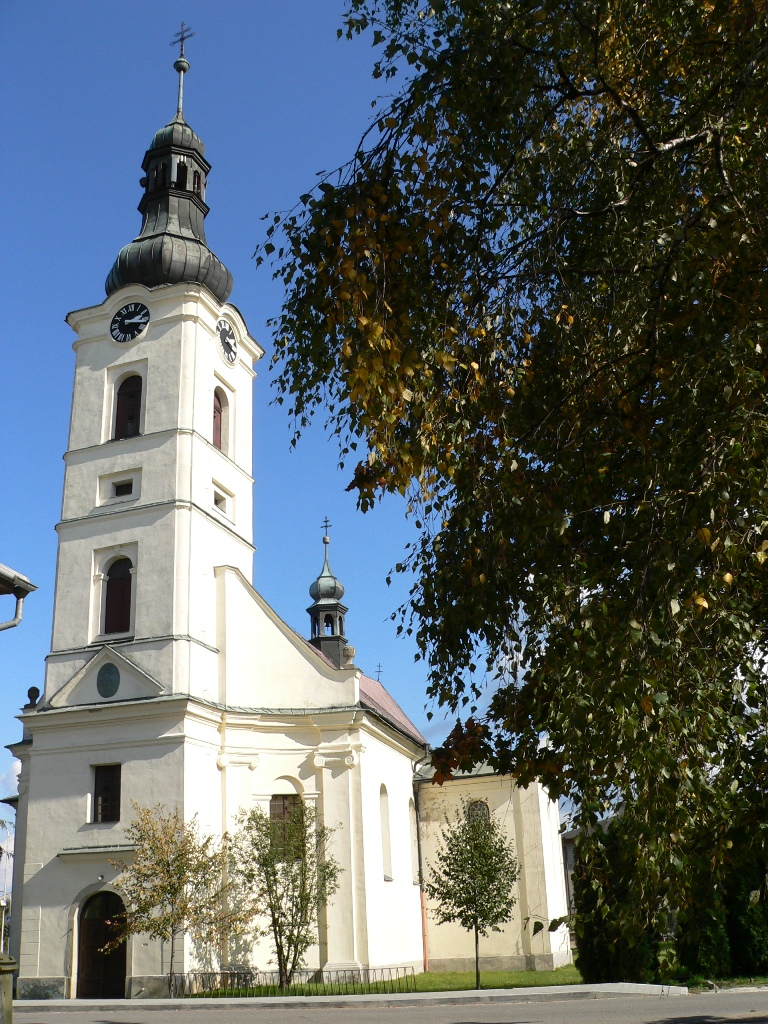
Church of Saint George

The current late Baroque building of the Church of Saint George was built in 1682–1686. The so-called Russian tower was added in 1816.

The Baroque building of the "U Oráče" restaurant dates from the turn of the 17th and 18th centuries. Behind the restaurant, a Baroque granary from the 18th century has been preserved.

== Notable people ==
- David Stypka (1979–2021), singer
- Ester Weimerová (born 1999), politician

== Twin towns – sister cities ==
Dobrá is twinned with:

- Buczkowice, Poland
- Mucharz, Poland
- Ochodnica, Slovakia
