= Education in the Czech Republic =

Education in the Czech Republic includes elementary school, secondary school, and post-secondary school. For students ages two to five, there are preschools that are generally not state-funded until the year before elementary school. After preschool, parents are not charged for tuition, but they must provide stationery and food for their children. A number of private schools exist across the country, but these schools are largely financially inaccessible for most children. There is an ongoing national discussion regarding the introduction of tuition fees for university education.

Elementary school is mandatory for children from ages six to fifteen. After that, some students leave formal education altogether, while other students attend a professional or vocational school. Enrollment in public schools is fairly high, though these figures do not document active student engagement.

Czech Republic’s education system is governed by the Ministry of Education, Youth, and Sports and had a budget of €4.6 billion in 2016.

== Elementary school ==
=== First Stage ===
The first stage covers the first five years of formal education. Classes are taught by a single teacher, although there is sometimes a separate foreign language or physical education teacher. The subjects taught are Czech and include one foreign language (usually English), mathematics, computer science, history, geography, science, art, music, physical education, and handcrafts. There is usually a first stage school in every village; in small villages, several years may be taught in one class.

=== Second Stage ===
The next four years of elementary school form the second stage, the last compulsory stage in education. Subjects taught at this stage include Czech, literature, two foreign languages, mathematics, computer science, history, geography, civics, physics, biology, chemistry, music, art, physical education, and handcrafts. Some of these subjects are only mandatory in years eight and nine.

Students are either taught in the same elementary school as their first stage, or at an eight-year academy (Czech: osmileté gymnázium)), or at a six-year academy (Czech: šestileté gymnázium). Continuing at an elementary school is the most popular option today, and six-year academies are quite rare. Some eight-year academies have a specific physical education emphasis, and some six-year academies have their later years almost entirely taught in a foreign language. Year-groups in the eight-year academy are usually called by Latin numbers; year one is prima (the first in Latin), year two is sekunda, and so on.

== Secondary school ==
Since the 2016/2017 school year, secondary schools that distribute students to a "maturita" degree upon graduation are required to set an entrance test in mathematics or the English language and the Czech language. This test is run by CERMAT, the government agency that also administers the maturita. Schools can also institute their own separate tests. In the part prepared by CERMAT, 12.3% of students who took the exam for the first time in the summer of 2025 failed.

=== Vocational School ===
Vocational certificates are given after a two- or three-year course and a final exam, though there are different types of qualifications depending on the profession. There are also two-year vocational courses that do not offer a certificate. Some vocational schools offer an academic maturita qualification in addition to the vocational certificate allowing progression to university. These schools last four years like any other school offering the maturita, and the student must pass both sets of exams to graduate.

=== Professional school and Lyceum ===
A professional school lasts four years and awards a maturita qualification. There is a large variety of industrial and technical skills covered including technical chemistry, electrical engineering, agriculture, internet technology, or business. A lyceum is a professional high school that teaches a more general curriculum; academic subjects like history and geography are taught more thoroughly than in an ordinary professional school. Types of lyceum include technical, pedagogical, medical, scientific, and military (operated in cooperation with the Ministry of Defense).

=== Grammar school ===
Grammar school, also called gymnasium, is either a continuation of an eight- and six-year academy or part of a four-year grammar school for elementary school graduates. Four-year grammar schools are either generally oriented or focus on physical or music education. The generally oriented grammar schools can decide on a specialization. The subjects are the same as in the second stage of elementary schools but are obligatory only in year ten and eleven (mathematics also in year twelve, Czech and two foreign languages until year thirteen). Schools can make these subjects obligatory in the last two years of school, or the students can have more elective subjects than the legally required minimum. Grammar school graduates have no qualification; the aim of this type of school is a preparation for university studies.

=== Maturita Exam ===
Maturita is the name of the universal leaving qualification of four-year secondary schools and is a requirement for university studies and higher professional schools. It is made up of a number of subjects. Every student must take Czech language and world literature, consisting of a reading and grammar exam, a writing exam, and a literature oral exam. The second subject must be either mathematics or a foreign language (English, German, French, Spanish or Russian, including writing, reading, speaking and listening, to B1 level of the Common European Framework of Reference for Languages). The exams for these mandatory subjects are standardized and set by CERMAT. The other two or three exams taken by the student at this time are dictated by the school.

=== Special and Practical Schools ===
Special schools for developmentally disabled children unable to participate in mainstream elementary education were once common in the Czech Republic. The subjects taught were very limited, meaning that leavers were logistically unable to continue on to all types of secondary education. A student required a reference from an educational psychologist and the agreement of parents to enroll in a special school. Special schools were replaced by elementary and practical schools, though the problem of the over-representation of Romani pupils continues. There are elementary practical schools usually taught in the same institution. These teach the equivalent of the first and second stages and one- to two-year secondary courses after the age of fifteen. The education is mainly practical to teach students to be self-sufficient. Meanwhile, "integrated education" of under-performing or mentally handicapped children in ordinary schools with the support of a special teacher is becoming more common.

== Tertiary education ==
On April 7, 1348, Charles IV founded the Charles University in Prague. The second university in present-day Czech Republic was established in 1576 (see Palacký University, Olomouc) in an effort to counter weigh the influence of Protestants, who controlled the Prague University and who constituted about 90% of country's population. After the Czechoslovak state was established, a number of other universities were founded, such as Masaryk University-- the second largest university in the Czech Republic.

=== Higher professional schools ===
Higher professional schools (vyšší odborná škola, VOŠ) offer professional tertiary education and are usually connected with professional high schools. Before their graduation, students must take final exams (absolutorium) and write a final thesis. Graduates are entitled to use the honorific "DiS." (diplomovaný specialista, specialist with diploma) after their name.

=== Universities ===
People with MA degree in the most populated Czech cities

Higher education in the Czech Republic consists of public and private universities, as well as state-run police and military training academies. Czech-language study at public universities is unlimited and free for first-time attendants; however after the age of 26, the attendant will not receive student status from social services and the individual's health insurance will not be state-funded. Czech public universities also host international students, who have the choice of free instruction in Czech or paid instruction in English.

For private universities, annual tuition is between 2,000 and 3,000 euro and for BSBA and MBA (not accredited by Ministry of Education) study programs cost between 3,000 and 10,000 euro. The perceived quality of education at public universities is higher than private institutions, as private universities have undergone many scandals in recent years.

University education takes from 2 to 6 years, depending on the degree of studies:

- Bachelor's degree programs - lasts usually 3 years, title Bc. (bakalář) or BcA. (bakalář umění) (only artistic fields of study), Maturita level is required. Students must pass final exam (státní zkouška, state exam - despite its name, this exam is not organized by state, but by universities themselves; at some universities required only if the student did not have good grades during his studies) and present their thesis.
- Master's degree programs - Bachelor's degree required, except of law, pharmacy, dentistry and 1st stage teaching (5 years programs, maturita required) and medicine (6 years programs, maturita required). They are finished by final exam (státní zkouška, for medicine státní rigorózní zkouška) and thesis presentation. Awarded titles:
  - Mgr. (magistr)
  - MgA. (magistr umění) - for artistic fields of study
  - Ing. (inženýr) - for technical and economical fields of study
  - Ing. arch. (inženýr architekt) - architecture
  - MUDr. (medicinae universalis doctor) - medicine
  - MVDr. (medicinae veterinariae doctor) - veterinary medicine
  - MDDr. (medicinae dentium doctor) - dentist
- Doctor study programs, Ph.D. title

These titles are granted after a special exam (rigorózní zkouška), which contains a thesis presentation. A master's degree is required to write this exam. This a non-comprehensive list titles given to those with doctorate degrees:

- PhDr. - philosophiae doctor, for philosophy, literature, languages, pedagogic and similar subjects
- JUDr. - iuris utriusque doctor, for law, formerly used also for security studies
- RNDr. - rerum naturalium doctor, for natural sciences
- ThDr./ThLic. - theologiae doctor / theologiae licentiatus, for theology
- PharmDr. - pharmaciae doctor, for pharmacy

Formerly, also other titles were used:

- PhMr. - pharmaciae magister, for pharmacy, replaced by Mgr. title
- PaedDr. - pedagogiae doctor, for pedagogy, replaced by PhDr. title
- RTDr. - rerum technicarum doctor, for technical science, it was not replaced by any title
- RCDr. - rerum commercialum doctor, for economics, it was not replaced by any title
- RSDr. - rerum socialium doctor, for absolvents of Communistic Party of Czechoslovakia Political University in Prague and Klement Gottwald Military Academy in Bratislava in years 1966-1989
- MSDr. - medicinae stomatologicae doctor, for dentistry in years 1951-1953, replaced by MUDr. in 1980 and subsequently replaced by MDDr. in 2004
- CSc. - candidatus scientiarum, "lower scientific degree", for absolvents of postgraduální studia (postgradual studies) in years 1953-1998, replaced by Ph.D.
- Dr. - doctor, written after the name and separated by a comma, for absolvents of postgraduální studia (postgradual studies) in years 1990-1998, replaced by Ph.D.
- Th.D. - theologiae doctor, for absolvents of doctoral studies of theology in years 1998-2016, replaced by Ph.D.
- DrSc. - doctor scientiarum, "higher scientific degree", for academics and researchers in years 1953-2001, a reception based on a dissertation thesis, partially replaced by DSc.

== Calendar ==
The school year starts on the first weekday of September and ends on the last weekday of June. It is divided into two semesters with exams at the end of each. Usually, the first semester runs from 1 September to 30 January, and the second from 1 February to 30 June, separated by a one-day break and the summer holidays. The actual dates, along with holidays and breaks, are announced by each school individually and may vary slightly.

=== Holidays ===
- autumn holidays - two working days around Independent Czechoslovak State Day (28/10), which is a public holiday
- Christmas (winter) holidays - about 9 – 12 days (usually 22/12 - 2/1, ends with first Sunday after new year)
- mid-term break - one-day holiday (1/2)
- spring holidays - one-week holiday with the date varying according to the district (usually from the beginning of February until the end of March)
- Easter holidays - three-day holiday (called Maundy Thursday, Good Friday, and Easter Monday)
- summer holidays - sixty-two-day+ holiday (1/7 - 31/8 plus days from last Friday in June to first Monday in September, which starts a new school year)

There is also Children's Day on 1 June, which is not considered a holiday, but children are usually taken on (school) trips (one day or more) and other cultural activities.

== See also ==
- List of schools in the Czech Republic
- List of universities in the Czech Republic
