= Daniel Beneš =

Czech businessman

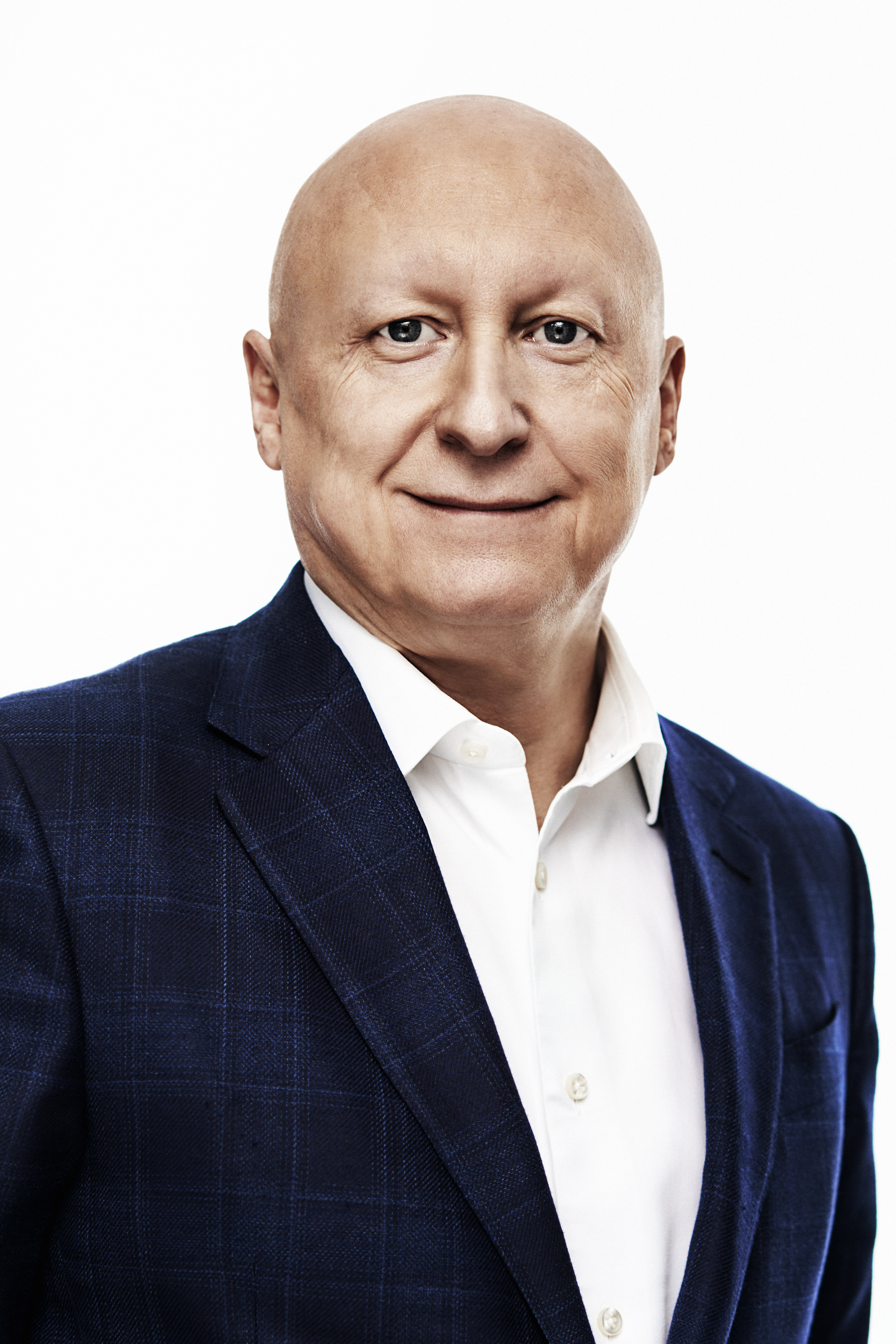
- Born: 19 March 1970 (age 56); Havířov, Czechoslovakia
- Education: Technical University of Ostrava; Brno International Business School
- Occupation: Manager
- Known for: Chief Executive Officer and Chairman of the Board of ČEZ

Daniel Beneš (born 19 March 1970) is a Czech manager and the CEO and Chairman of the Board of the ČEZ. He is Vice-President of the Confederation of Industry of the Czech Republic and Chairman of the Board of the Energy Union of the Czech Republic (SEČR). He has served as a member of the Government's National Economic Council and as Vice-President of the Alliance for an Emission-Free Future. Daniel Beneš is married and has two children.

Life and Career

He graduated from the Faculty of Mechanical Engineering at the VSB – Technical University of Ostrava (earning the title Ing.) and completed an MBA programme delivered by Brno International Business School in cooperation with Nottingham Trent University.

Between 2000 and 2004, he served as the Director of TCHAS, a leading fuel importer and trader in the Czech Republic. He has been with ČEZ since 2004. On 15 September 2011, he was appointed Chairman of the Board of Directors and Chief Executive Officer of ČEZ.

Public Activities

Since 2015, he has been a member of the Board of the Confederation of Industry of the Czech Republic, where he now serves as Vice-President. From 2023, he served as Vice-President of the Alliance for an Emission-Free Future. He also acted as a member of the re-established Government's National Economic Council. He was a member of the Commission on Climate Change of the Research, Development and Innovation Council, as well as of the Coal Commission, which served as an advisory body to the Government of the Czech Republic. Since 2025, Daniel Beneš has been Chairman of the Board of the Energy Union of the Czech Republic (SEČR).

In May 2021, the ČEZ Group, as part of its accelerated strategy VISION 2030 – Clean Energy of Tomorrow, defined its strategic objectives for 2030. The goals are to transform its generation portfolio into a low-emission one by that time, to reduce its emission intensity by more than 50%, and to achieve climate neutrality by 2040. ČEZ also aims to provide the most advantageous energy solutions and the best customer experience on the market.

Under Beneš’s leadership, the ČEZ Group had paid a stable dividend. The current payout ratio is set within the interval of 60%-80% of consolidated net profit adjusted for extraordinary items.

Personal Life

Daniel Beneš is married and has two children. Dominika Beneš is his second wife.

Daniel Beneš has received a number of significant awards during his professional career. The Czech Management Association ranked him among the Top 10 Managers of the Quarter-Century. He received a silver medal for merit from the Archbishop of Prague and Primate of Bohemia. He was Manager of the Year 2014, and in 2012 the Czech Institute of Directors awarded him the title Best Board Member. In 2024, he was selected by the organisation ČESKObudoucnosti (The Czech Republic of the Future) as CEO of the Year. In 2025, he received one of the most significant papal orders: Knight of the Order of St Gregory the Great.
