= Dobrá u Frýdku-Místku =

Railway station in the Czech Republic

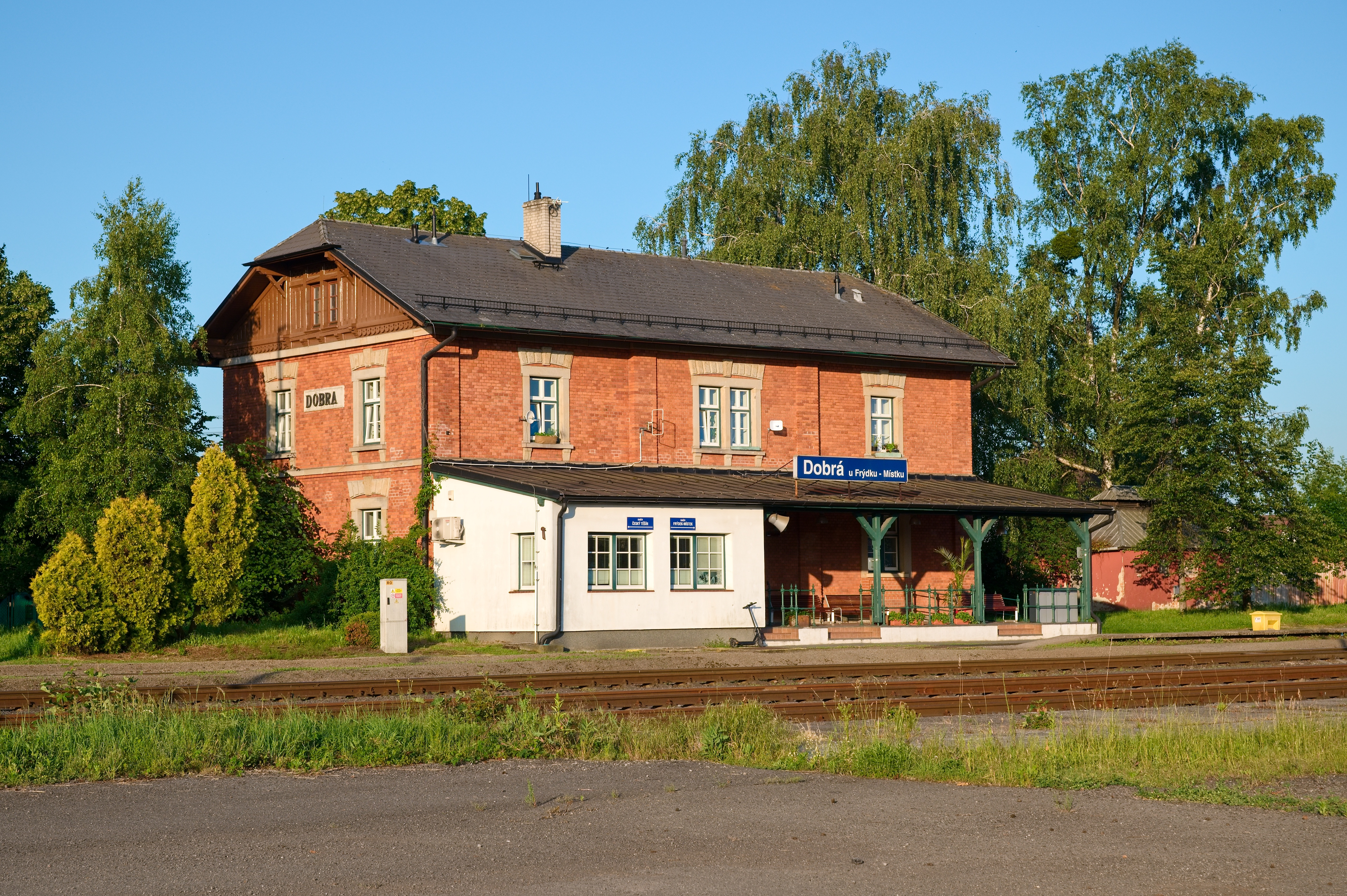
- The station in 2025

General information
- Location: Dobrá, Moravian-Silesian Region; Czech Republic
- Coordinates: 49.6707°N 18.4144°E
- Operated by: Správa železnic
- Lines: Cieszyn–Frýdek-Místek railway line; Moravian-Silesian Towns Railway (originally)
- Distance: 116.86 km (72.61 mi)
- Platforms: 2 (2)
- Tracks: 3

Construction
- Architect: Anton Dachler

Other information
- Station code: 332841

History
- Opened: 1 June 1888
- Rebuilt: 2004
Location

Dobrá u Frýdku-Místku is a railway station located in Dobrá in the Moravian-Silesian Region of the Czech Republic. It is a part of the Cieszyn–Frýdek-Místek railway line, located at the 116.86 km (72.61 mi) mark. The station opened on 22 July 1888.

== History ==
The station was put into operation on 1 June 1888, but was officially opened on 22 July 1888 as Dobrau. It was part of the Moravian-Silesian Towns Railway, which was built by the Emperor Ferdinand Northern Railway c. 1887–1888. In April 1939, Antonín Zápotocký, the future president of Czechoslovakia, was arrested at the station for trying to illegally cross the Polish border and was sentenced to the Pankrác Prison for twelve months. During the Second World War, the Nazis damaged twenty-six locomotives at the station to block trains on the railway line from giving supplies to the Soviets. At the end of 2008, a siding to the Hyundai Motor Manufacturing Czech car factory was put into operation, which was connected to the station. Správa železnic, the Czech national railway infrastructure manager, planned to modernise the station. This includes a reconstruction of the track, the building of three tracks which are to facilitate train transfers, the construction of an island platform accessed via a pedestrian underpass, and an increase of the maximum line speed to 120 km/h (75 mph).

== Station description ==
A brick station building, along with a warehouse, is on the station grounds. The station building was built according to the standardised plans (Note: named Normalplan No 37d.) by Anton Dachler. The two-story building has stone linings with arches and a central risalit, in which there was a vestibule with two waiting rooms and an office. On the first floor, there was a two-room apartment and a three-room apartment with kitchens. Both of them had common facilities in a hallway. During the reconstruction of the station building, plastic windows were inserted into the stone lining of the station building. Next to the station building, there is a railway guardhouse. (Note: The plans for the railway guardhouse were named Normalplan No 19.) It was built with masonry.

There are three traffic tracks in the main area of the station, which are numbered 1, 2, and 4 from the building. There is a deviation of the axis in the station, which means that a train from Frýdek–Místek station enters directly onto track 2, and from Hnojník station onto track 1. Additionally, three other tracks are connected to the station: next to the building, there is a double-sided shunting handling track numbered track 3 inside the station, which connects to the Radegast brewery siding, facing towards Hnojník, and on the opposite side of track 3 there is another double-sided shunting handling track numbered track 6; the JungCargoo siding connects to track 4 at the Hnojník headland; and the HMMC Nošovice siding branching off from a track numbered track 90. A siding that goes to ČEPS Nošovice is also connected to the brewery siding.
