= Anabin =

German-language database

Anabin is a database of the German government that provides information about the accreditation and acceptance of foreign third-level degrees. It is the binding reference for German administrations, employers and private individuals to validate degrees. Within the European Union, all degrees by all member countries are inter-acceptable therefore Anabin is a reference mostly for non-European degrees.

== History ==
The database was first launched as a cooperation of three German-speaking countries:

- Germany, the Hessian Ministry of Higher Education, Research and the Arts
  - together with the former Central Agency for Foreign Education (ZAB),
- Austria, the Federal Ministry for Digital and Economic Affairs, and
- Luxembourg, the Federal Ministry of Economy.

The data are made available online since 2000 by the Kultusministerkonferenz, a round table of the Secretaries of Education of all 16 German federal states. The database provides documentation of the education systems jn 180 countries and offers detailed insights about there existing third-level education systems and degrees and how they value in comparison to the German system. With this source, the owner of a foreign degree can have a first assessment about the possible accreditation of it in Germany. For many employers this database is the first reference checking the validity of foreign degrees.

== Accreditation ==
Anabin accredites in two steps: First, foreign institutions itself. This list provides insight whether a foreign institution is rated as providing equivalent education and research skills as the standard German institution. The institutions are put into three brackets:

- H+ means the institution is seen as equivalent to a German Hochschule (institute of higher education).
- H- means the accreditation is neither not yet or never will be rated as equivalent to a German institution of higher education.
- H+/- means the institution’s degrees are accredited on a case to case-basis and offers degrees that are equivalent to the German education standard and others that are not.

Practical implications might be that a German hospital may only hire and have working a medical professional with an accredited education from an accredited institution. The database is also a reference for public employees with foreign degrees to confirm their eligibility for higher positions. The database is also the first reference for applicants of a Blue Card. If individuals are unsure about the status of their degree they can request an official evaluation of their degree.
