= Park Lane International School =

Location
- Norbertov 3, Praha 6, Střešovice, Úvoz 9, Praha 1, Malá Strana; Valdštejnská 151, Prague 1 – Malá Strana; Prague; Czech Republic; 50°5′31.19″N 14°22′36.64″E

Information
- Type: International School
- Motto: Educating the students of today for the unknown occupations of tomorrow.
- Established: 2006
- Status: Opened
- Principal: Paul Ingarfield
- Years offered: Pre-Nursery — Year 13
- Age range: 2 – 18
- Language: English
- Website: www.parklane-is.com

Park Lane International School is an independent international day school located in Prague, the Czech Republic. The Park Lane student community consists of 600+ students, representing more than 40 nationalities. The home to foreign student ratio is 54% to 46%.

The EYFS, Primary and Secondary campuses currently cater for children from Pre-Nursery (aged 2–3) to Year 13 (aged 16–18). Following its IB World School accreditation in February 2018, Park Lane has recently expanded to accommodate pupils (aged 16–18), who study the International Baccalaureate Diploma Programme at the IB Diploma Centre in Úvoz street (Also in Prague 1 – Malá Strana).

Although classified as a British international school, because of its location in the Czech Republic, Park Lane also offers an intensive Czech programme for all pupils. This programme ensures that Park Lane's students pass their annual Czech state examinations as required by Czech law.

== History ==
Park Lane International School opened in 2007. Within 7 years, it had grown into a full-scale Primary school with 180 pupils on roll. In 2013, the Secondary school campus at Valdštejnská was opened. The Senior school site, located at Klárov, opened in the 2017/2018 academic year. The school caters for 700+ students from the EYFS through to Secondary school.

== Locations ==
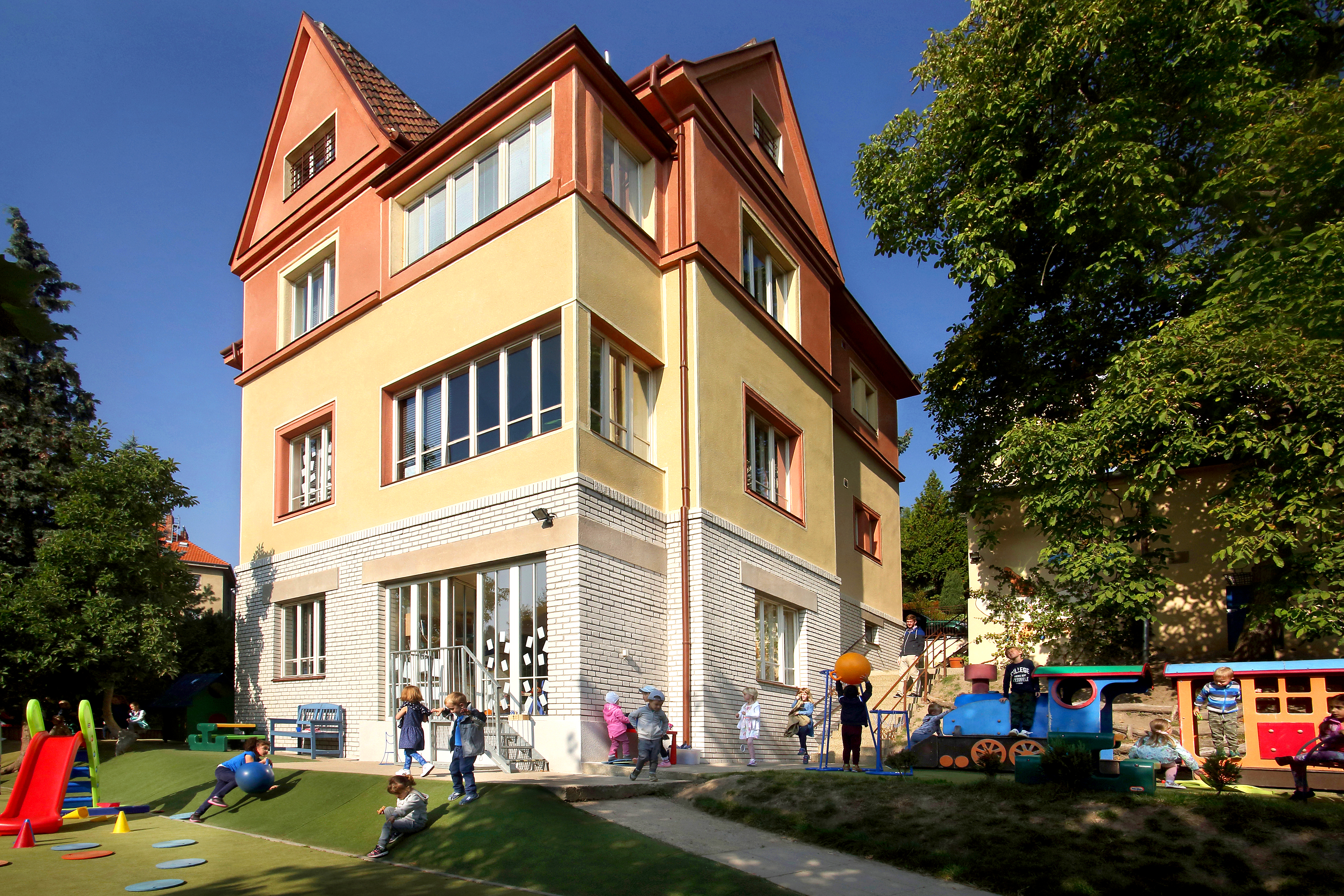
Nessie English Preschool, Prague 5

Park Lane International School opened its first campus at Prague 5 Bertramka accommodating children aged from 2 to 6 years. The Prague 5 Bertramka campus accommodates the Early Years Foundation Stage.

The School's primary campus has its headquarters in a building called Norbertov at Prague 6. Norbertov, which originally served as a kindergarten and was built by the church in 1904. The school is located in Střešovice.

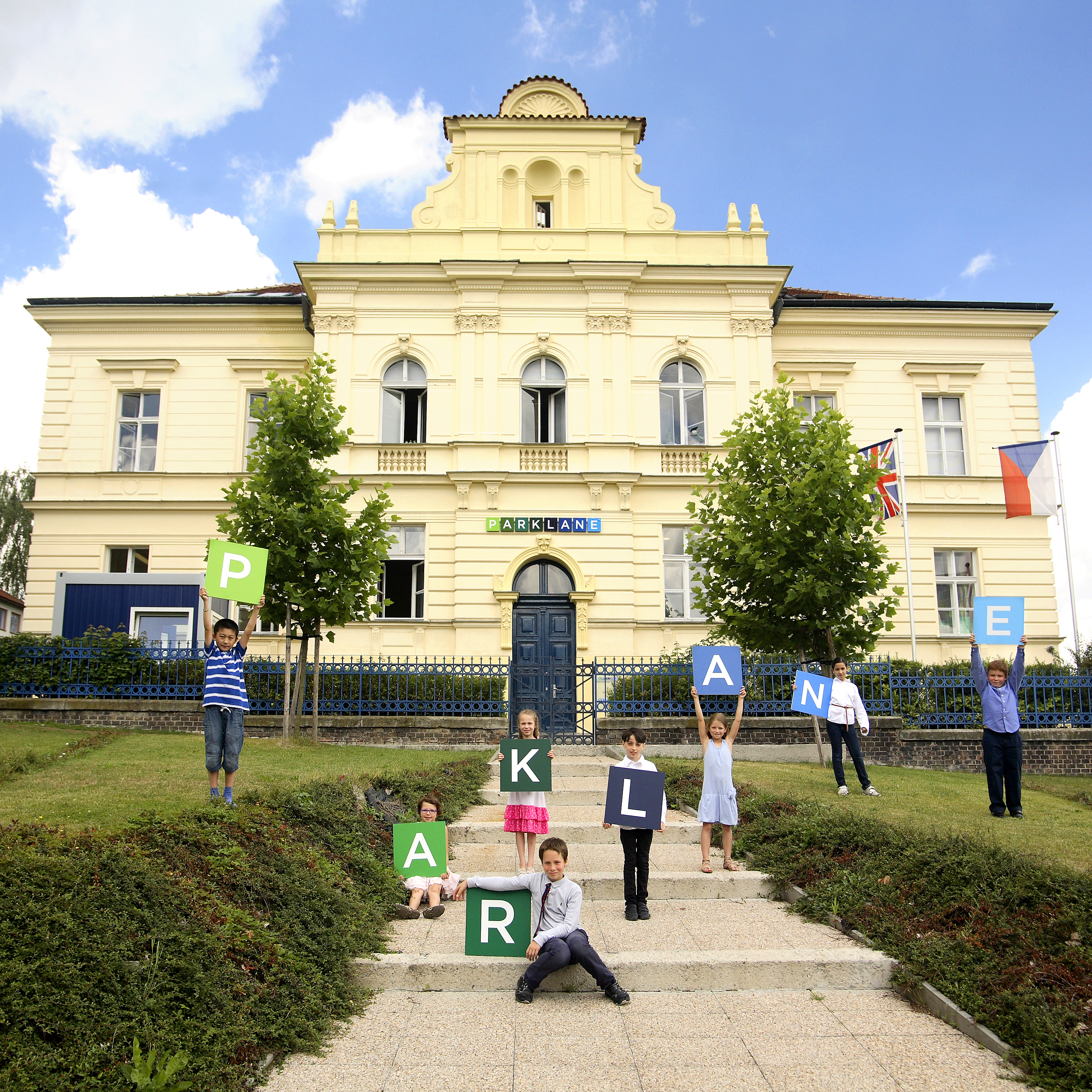
Norbertov campus, Prague 6 (Primary school)

Another part of the Střešovice-Prague 6 campus is the Sibeliova branch, a villa with a purpose-designed garden that is home to the Early Years Foundation Stage.

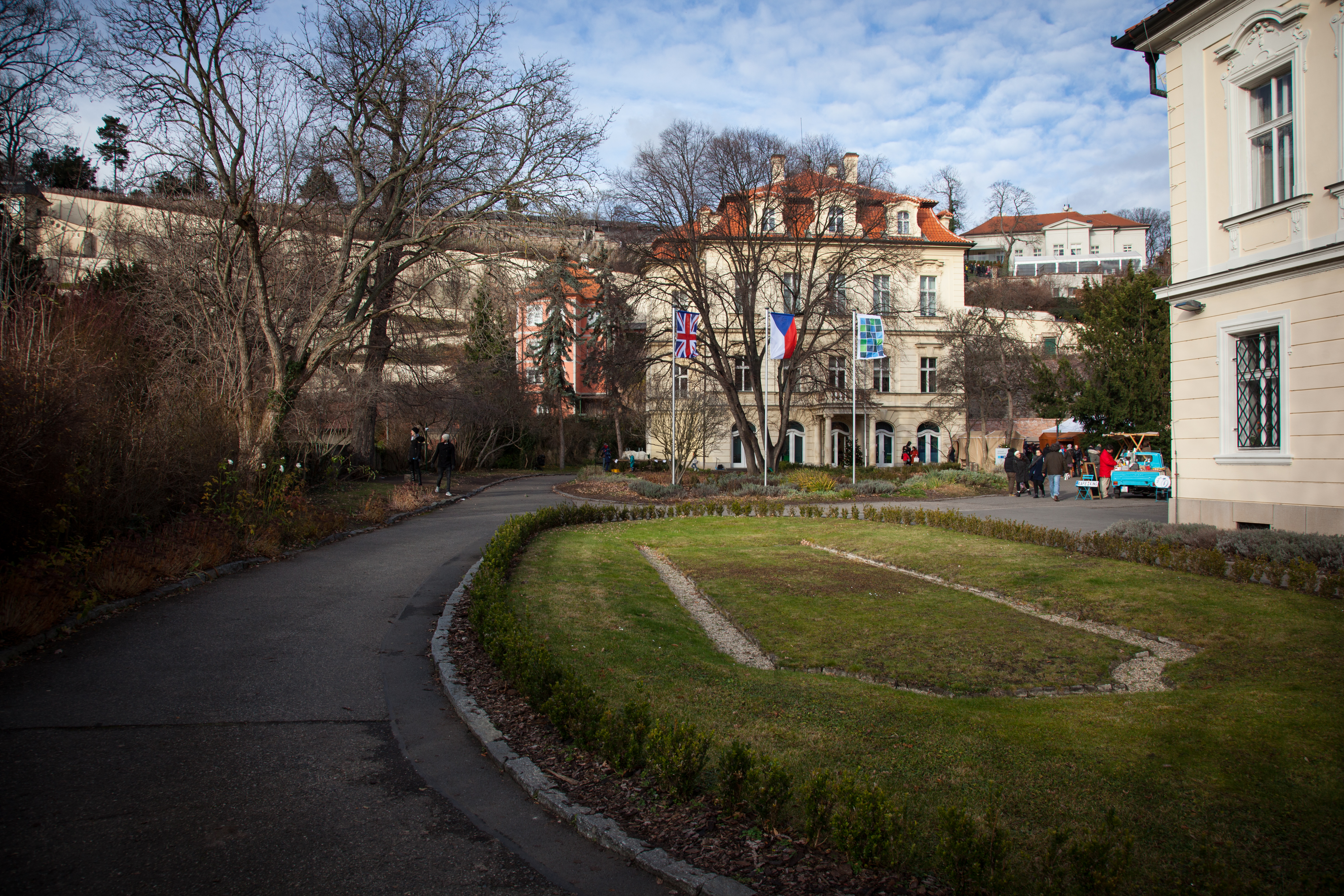
Valdštejnská campus, Prague 1, (Year 6 of Primary school, Years 7-9 of Secondary school)

The Prague 6 Střešovice campus accommodates children from Nursery to Year 5.

The Secondary school, which opened in September 2013, is situated in the district of Malá Strana in a building situated directly alongside the walls of Prague Castle and close to Malostranská metro station and a major tram stop which serves several different routes. Surrounded by its own walled gardens and terraces in a plot measuring 3000m2, the building was used as an embassy for several decades.

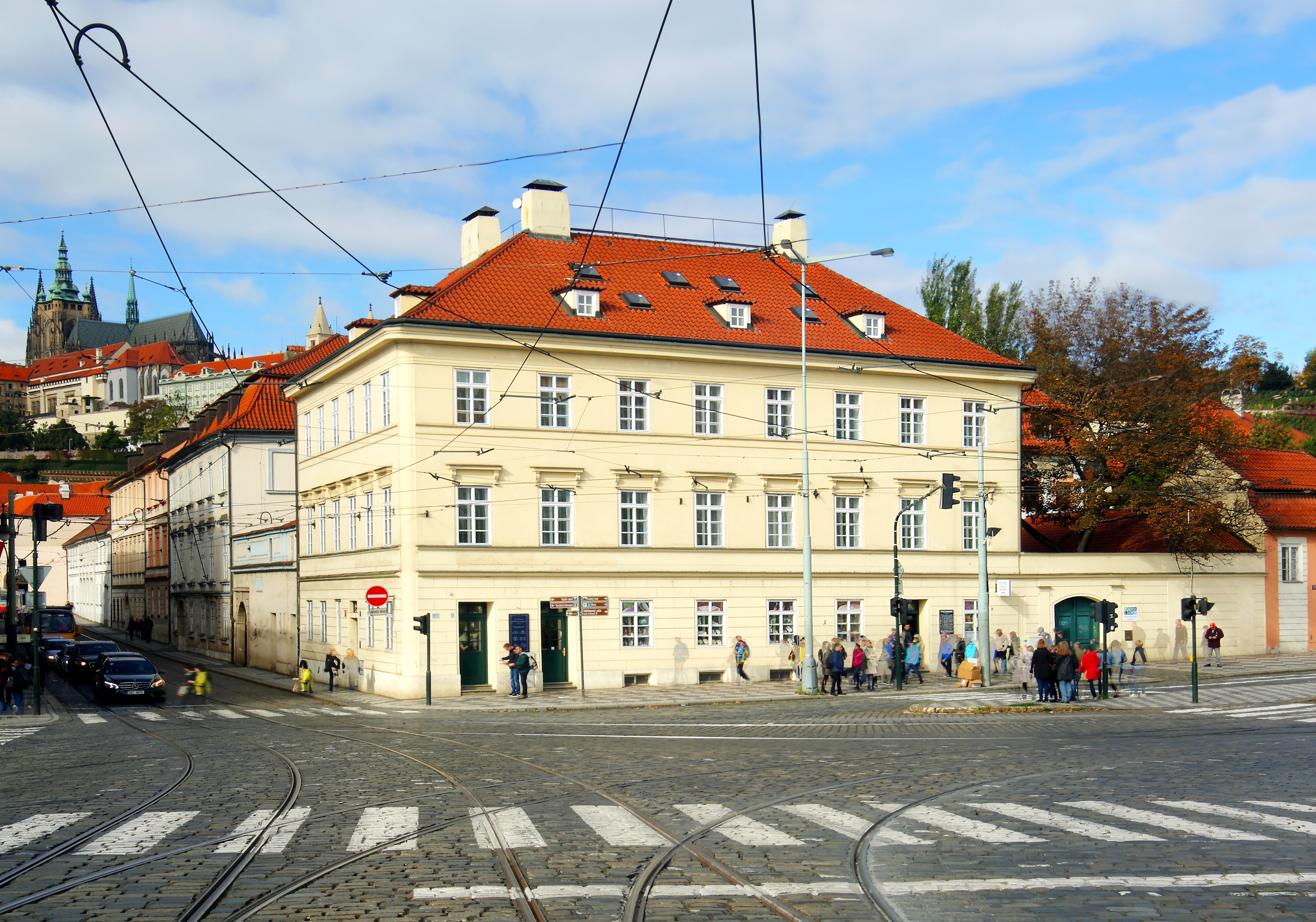
Klárov site, a campus of Years 10 -11 of Secondary school

The next addition to the Prague 1 campus, located a short walk away from the Prague 1 Valdštejnská building, was the Klárov branch, which caters to students in the years 10-11 of Secondary school and is a registered location for Cambridge IGCSE and IB Diploma examinations.

As of 2022, Parklane added a new campus to its arsenal at Úvoz, next to the historic Prague castle. This campus is used primarily for IB Students ranging from ages 16 to 18.

== Curriculum ==
The school follows the National Curriculum of England and offers British education to children from pre-nursery to university entrance, taught by the UK qualified native speakers, plus British trained foreign teachers and local teachers.

Pupils at Park Lane International School prepare for KS2 National Tests and, at the secondary level, will sit for Cambridge IGCSE examinations, followed by the International Baccalaureate Diploma Programme (IBDP).

Modern Foreign languages at Park Lane are offered both within the curriculum provision as well as through the extracurricular activities. Students at Park Lane can choose among Spanish, French, German, and Russian languages.

Art and Music education are part of Park Lane's educational provision. The music department, in cooperation with the International School of Music and Fine Arts, offers a range of curriculum-based as well as extracurricular classes, both individual as well as groups, such as bands and choir. Every year, the music department holds an annual music extravaganza called the Sound of Park Lane. Since 2015, the Art department has hosted the Park Lane International Film Festival (PLIFF) targeted at students of other international schools in the Czech Republic and beyond.

== Scholarship ==
Park Lane International School offers an IB scholarship programme to all potential candidates.

== Accreditations and inspections ==
Park Lane International School is an executive member of the Council of British International Schools, and undergoes regular inspections by the Independent Schools Inspectorate. Park Lane underwent its most recent British Schools Overseas (BSO) inspection in May 2022, achieving excellent results in all aspects of the inspection. It is a member of the Independent Schools Council and is recognized by the UK Department of Education.

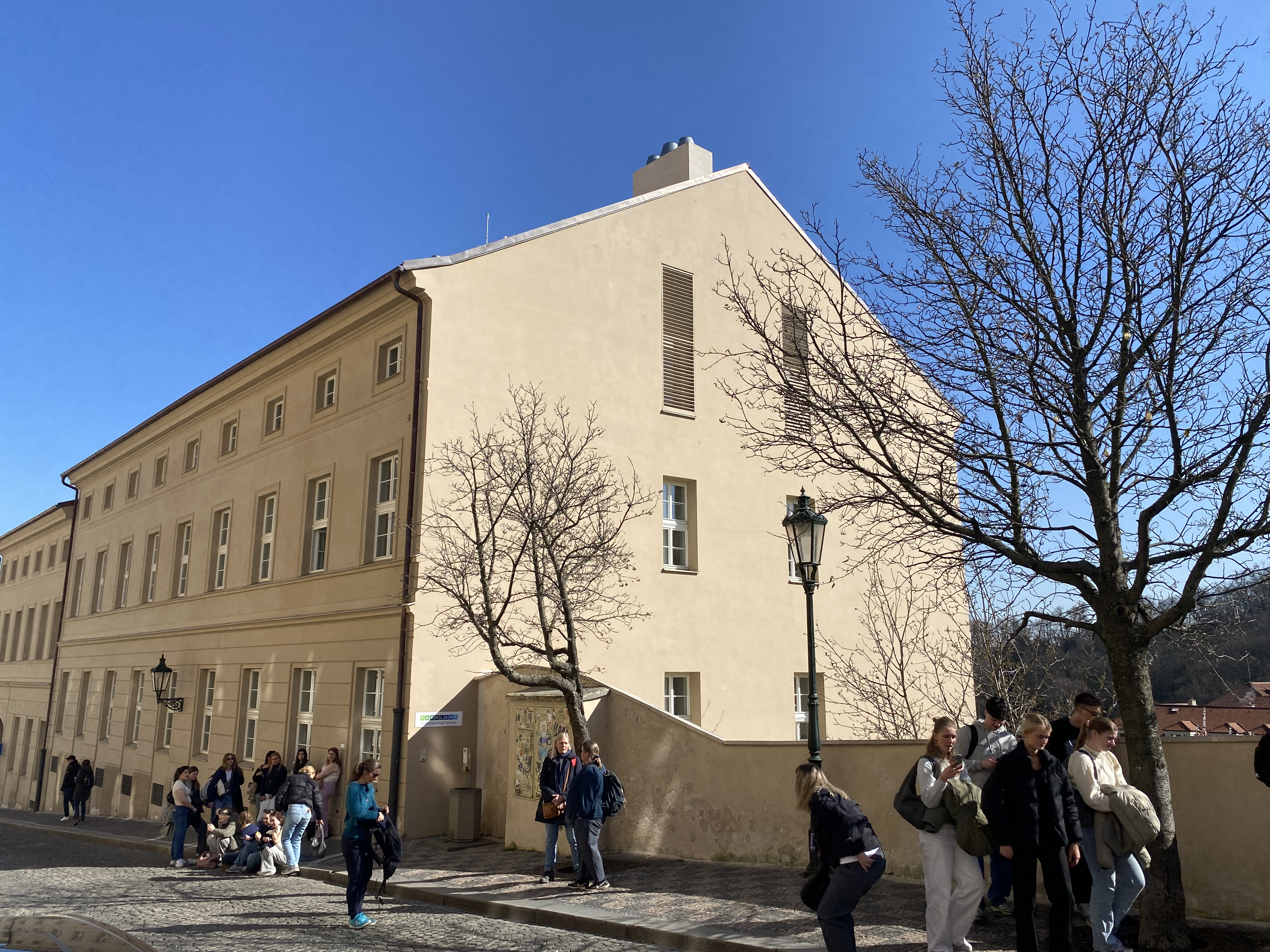
IB Centre at Úvoz, a campus of Years 12-13 of Secondary School

== Leadership ==
From its inception until June 2012, the Director of Park Lane was Barbara (Basia) Lubaczewska. In September 2012, Paul Ingarfield took over as Principal of Park Lane. The Vice-Principal plus Head of EYFS and the Primary School is Mr Jonathan (Joe) Eyles. Mr Paul Churchill was appointed Head of Secondary in 2021.

The school is administered by a governing board consisting of two proprietors, the Principal, the Vice-Principal/Head of Primary & EYFS, the Head of Secondary, the deputy heads of EYFS/ Primary and Secondary, plus the Director of Operations (non-academic). The governing board holds regular meetings 4-5 times per academic year and is supported by two sub-committees and the Park Lane Parents' Forum.
