= Unicorn University =

Private university in Prague, Czech Republic

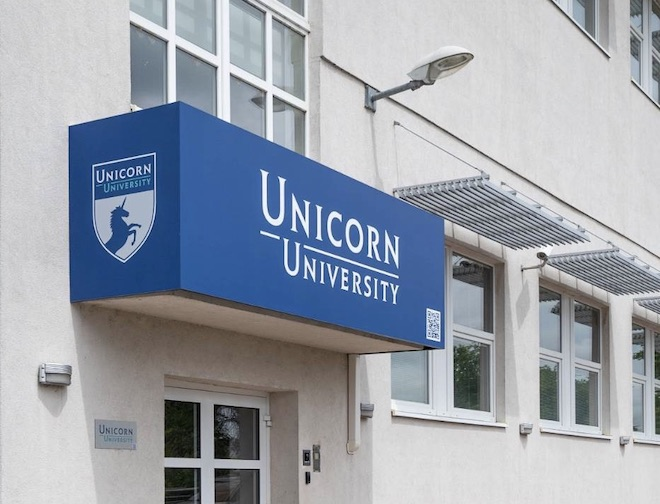
- Type: Private School
- Established: 2007
- Rector: prof. Ing. Jan Čadil, Ph.D.
- Director: Ing. Jakub Rykr Šindelář
- Students: 1,028
- Location: Prague, Czech Republic; 50°5′12.6″N 14°27′47.15″E
- Website: unicornuniversity.net
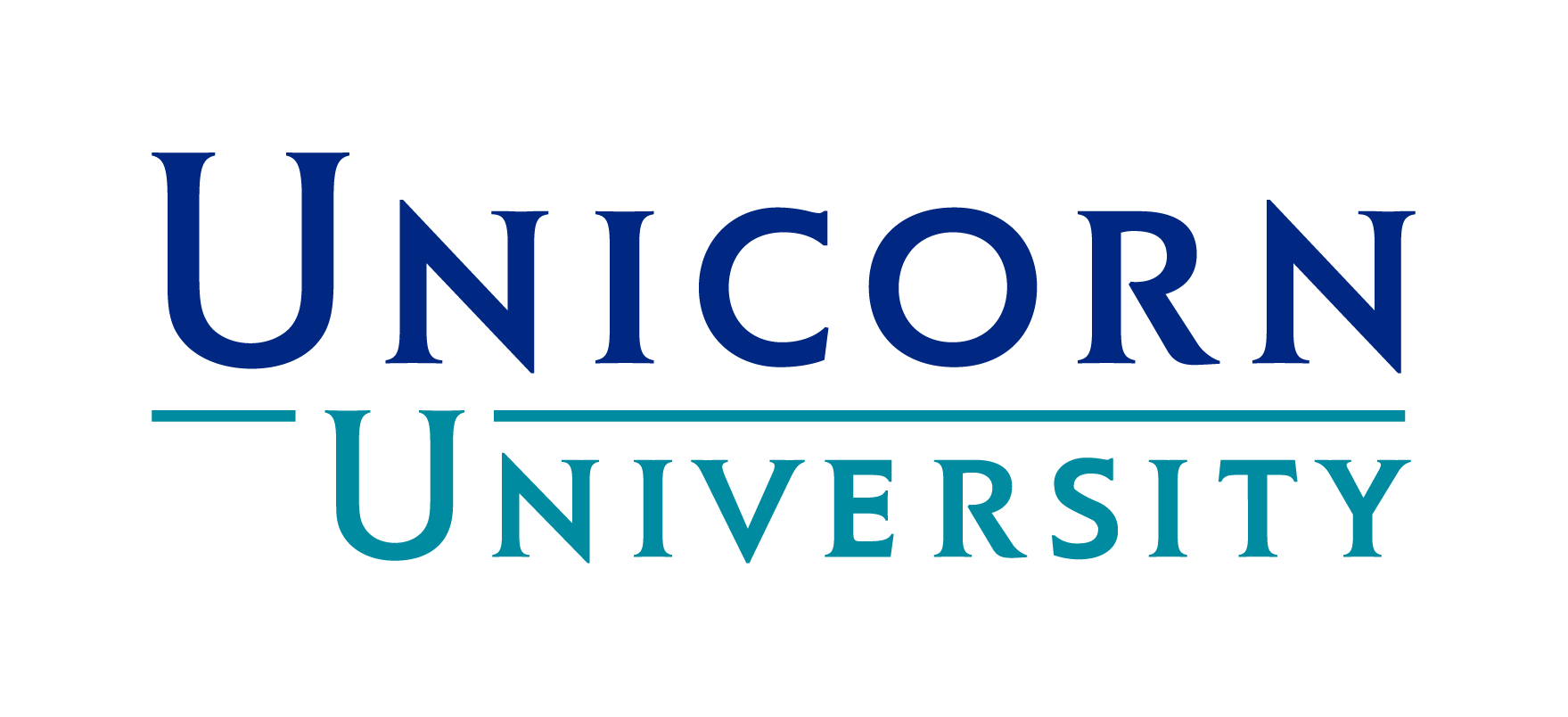

Unicorn University, formerly known as Unicorn College, is a vocationally oriented private university located in Prague. It was established in 2007 by Unicorn a.s. The institution was transferred under the ownership of Unicorn Learning Centre a.s. in 2009 in which Unicorn a.s. is as a sole owner.

== Study ==
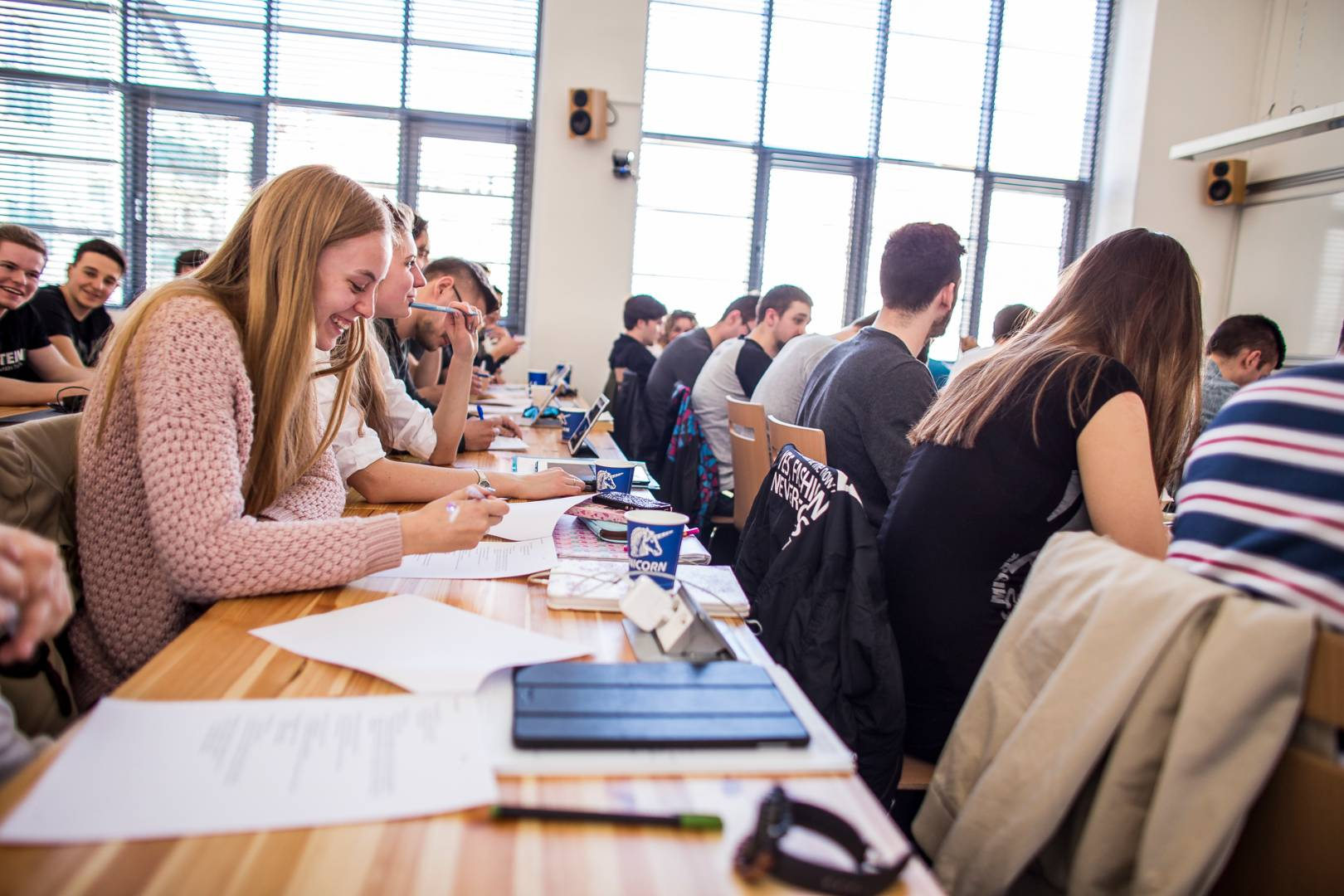
Students in class.

The university offers study programmes in full-time and combined form at the bachelor and master level, accredited by the Ministry of Education, Youth and Sports. All bachelor study programmes are available in English as well.

The university also runs a double-degree programme implemented in cooperation with the University of Applied Sciences Würzburg-Schweinfurt (FHWS). The programme lets students spend two semesters (2nd year of study) at the university in Bavaria. Upon successful graduation, students acquire a bachelor's degree in Business Management (Unicorn University) and in International Management (FHWS).

Unicorn University was the first university in the Czech Republic to offer a fully online form of study.

=== Bachelor Study Programmes ===
- Software Development – online, full-time, combined form of study
- Business Management – online, full-time, combined form of study
- Business Management (double degree) – full-time, combined form of study

=== Follow-up Master Study Programmes ===
- Software Engineering and Big Data – full-time form of study
- Applied Economics and Data Analysis – full-time form of study

Classes take place at three campuses – at Parukářka, in Holešovice and Vysočany. Students can use online apps for each course, developed internally to achieve higher interactivity, availability and overall study attractiveness.

== Focus of Study ==
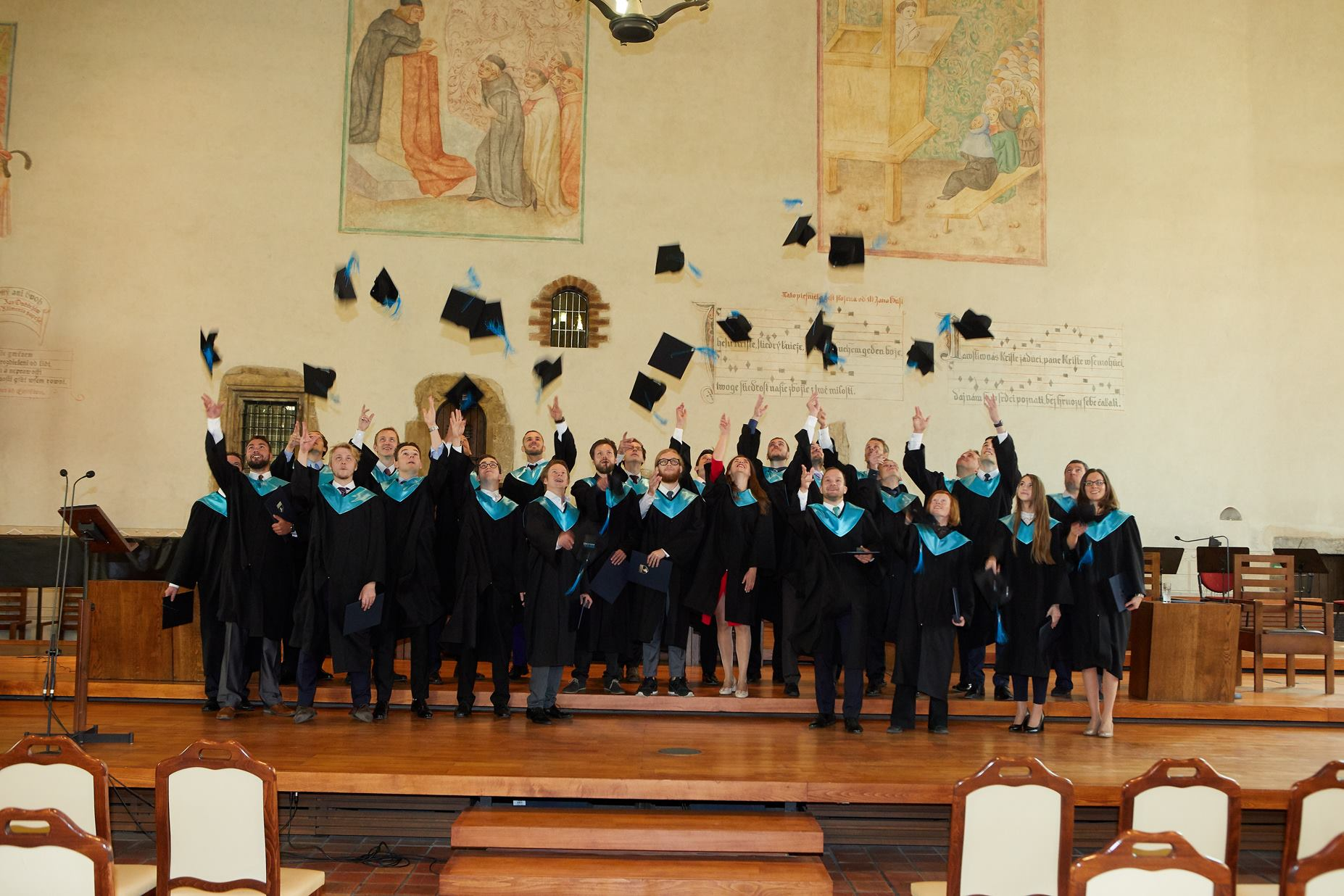
Graduation ceremony.

The study at Unicorn University focuses on IT, economics, business management and data analysis. Unicorn University is the only private university in the Czech Republic with technical specialization. The university currently hosts students from 16 countries and foreign students make roughly a quarter of the total number of students.

Some graduates find a job in the Unicorn a.s group. The structure of graduates focusing on IT and graduates focusing on economics was balanced in 2019. The Ministry of Labour and Social Affairs did not register any Unicorn University graduate as unemployed in the same year.

Teaching takes place in modern classrooms at KCD4, Prague 9, Vysočany.

== Science and Research ==
Unicorn University has been engaged in applied research for a long time. The school cooperates with many corporations. Solving research infrastructure for CERN experiments represents a most important project. In the Czech Republic, the project is run in cooperation with the Czech Technical University in Prague, Charles University and the Czech Academy of Sciences. The research programme constitutes a long-term project of research cooperation planned to be finalized in 2025. Unicorn University represents a sole contractual developer and supplier of the ATLAS Product Database. Both academic employees and students take part and students have an opportunity to process their qualification thesis within the project.

Research papers of Unicorn University academic employees have been published for example in International Small Business Journal-Researching Entrepreneurship, Marketing Science or Journal of Atmospheric and Solar-Terrestrial Physics. Monographs have been published e.g. by the Springer Nature publishing house.

Unicorn Research Centre was established in 2017 at Unicorn University, focusing on research.

The school has a library with items available for the whole Unicorn a.s. group and with remote access to research databases.

== Unicorn University Open ==
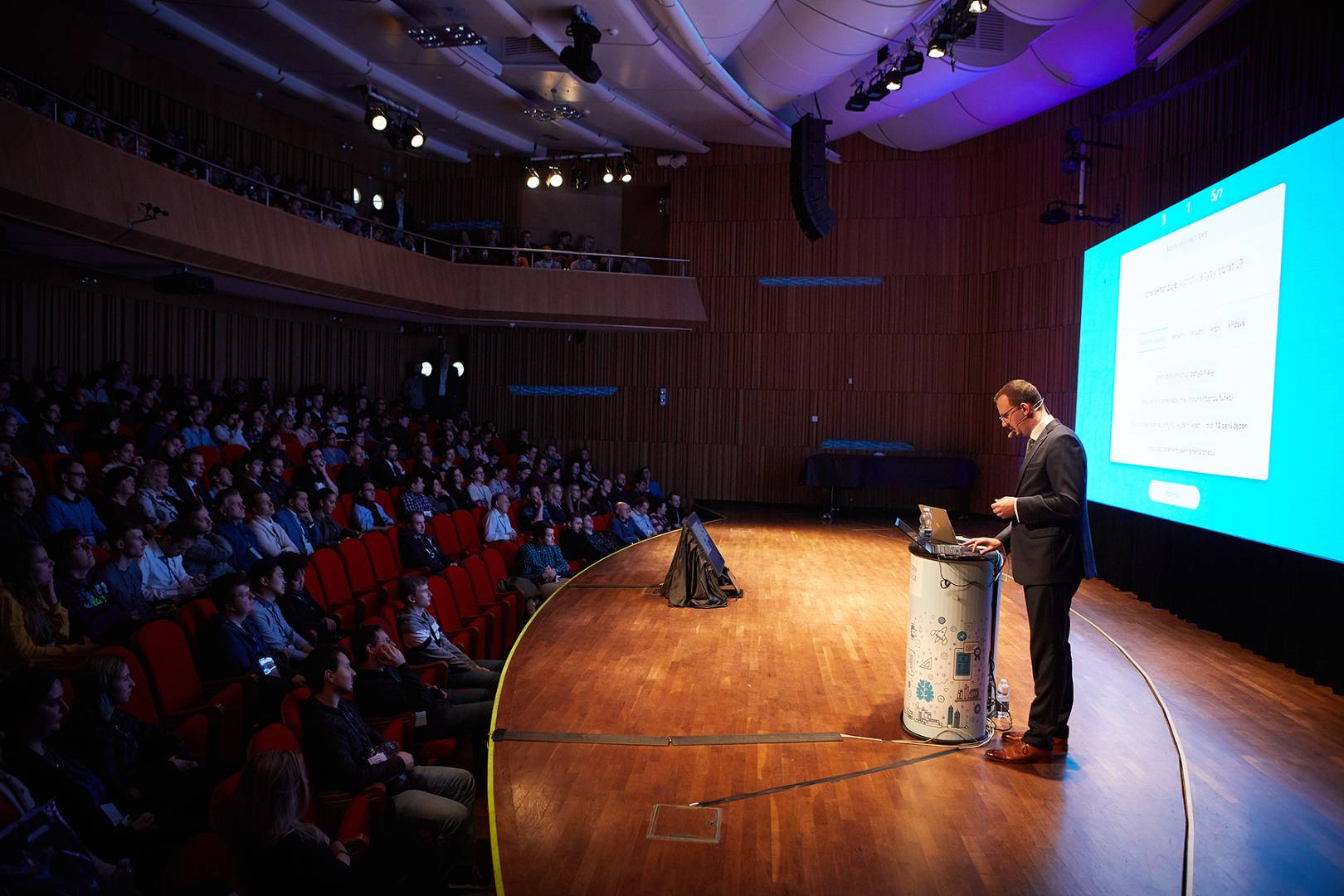
Unicorn University Open 2019.

Unicorn University Open is a regular one-day conference of Unicorn University, focused on current topics in the areas of IT, data analysis and business. Students and interested parties from the general public are invited to the conferences.

In the past, the Unicorn University Open was held for example on the following topics: Artificial Intelligence Ultimate Game Changer, Expensive energy - a threat and an opportunity, Education of the future, Investing in Digital Age and others.

== Cooperation ==
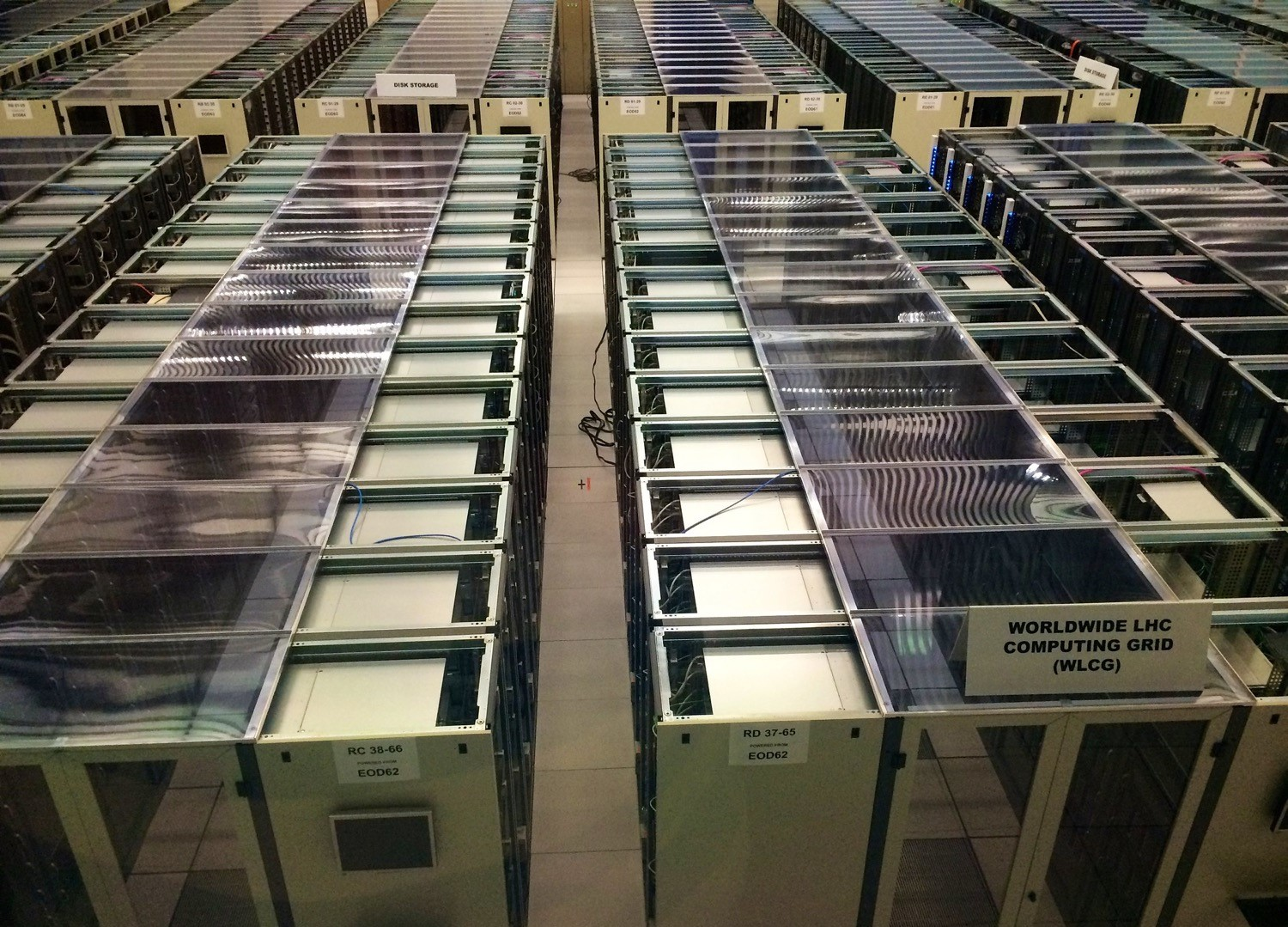
Unicorn University cooperates with CERN.

Unicorn University cooperates with a number of universities abroad. Contractual cooperation is established with universities from 13 countries, including, for example, Manchester Metropolitan University (Great Britain), The Hague University of Applied Sciences (Netherlands), ESCE International Business School (France) and Aarhus Business School (Denmark), where students can spend part of his studies.

As part of the scientific research activities within the ITk Production Database project of the ATLAS experiment for CERN, there is cooperation with, for example, the University of Oxford, the University of Cambridge, Rutherford Appleton Laboratory, Lawrence Berkeley National Laboratory, University of Glasgow, University of Geneva.

The school has established cooperation with companies in the fields of banking, insurance, consulting and information technology.
