= Varsovia University of Business and Applied Sciences =

Polish private university in Warsaw facing fraud charges since 2022

- Uczelnia Biznesu i Nauk Stosowanych “Varsovia”
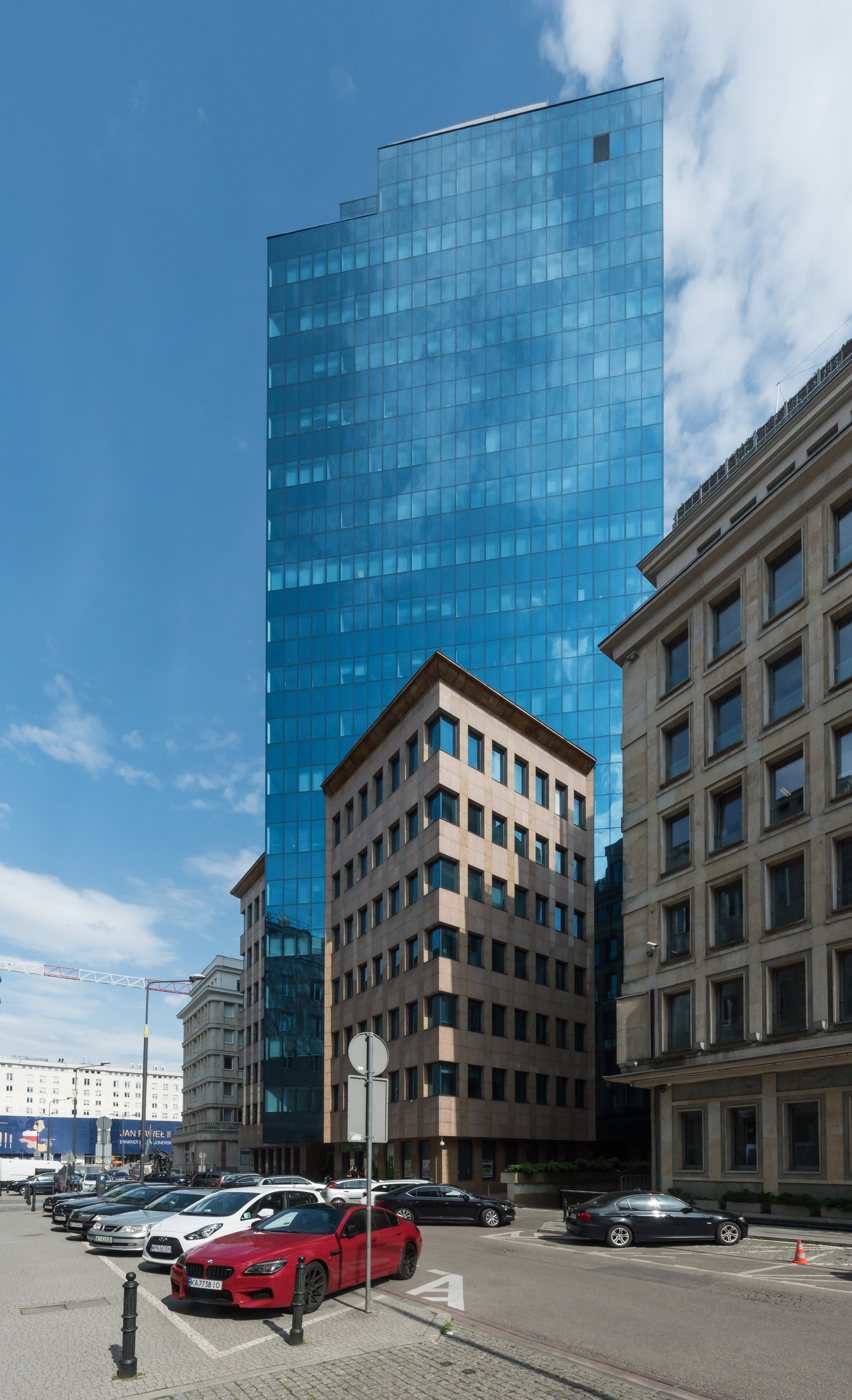
- Collegium Humanum's Warsaw headquarters
- Other name: Collegium Humanum
- Motto: Edukacja dla sukcesu
- Motto in English: Education for Success
- Type: Private
- Established: 2018
- Rector: Magdalena Stryja
- Students: 25,211 (12.2023)
- Location: Warsaw, Masovian Voivodeship, Poland; 52.234972°N 21.012381°E
- Website: varsovia.study

The Varsovia University of Business and Applied Sciences, until 2026 known as the Collegium Humanum – Warsaw Management University (CH), is an international, private university with its seat in Warsaw and branches in Rzeszów, Poznań, the Czech Republic (Prague, Frýdek-Místek), Slovakia (Bratislava) and Uzbekistan (Andijan). As of March 2024, Collegium Humanum is under compulsory governmental administration due to various academic fraud and corruption charges, chiefly selling MBA and graduate titles.

== History ==
The university was established in 2018 by decision of the Minister of Science and Higher Education at the request of the Institute of International Studies and Education Humanum Sp. z o.o. (founded in 2011) with its seat in Warsaw and was then entered into the Register of Private Universities under number 383. Before, Humanum Institute had been a publisher of generic journals and a self-claimed research facility.

Collegium Humanum (C.H.) is a member of the Business Graduates Association.

In 2020, Collegium Humanum received the "Pro Masovia" Commemorative Medal for its particular contribution to the economic, social and cultural development of the wider Mazovia Region.

Since 2020, Collegium Humanum has been a signatory to PRME (Principles for Responsible Management Education), an international forum of leading business universities from around the world operating under the auspices of the United Nations, whose aims are to shape global attitudes of social responsibility among future leaders across business, politics and other dimensions of public life.

Postgraduate studies of Executive Master of Business Administration (MBA) taught at Collegium Humanum have secured a Professional Class ranking in the MBA Programme Rating prepared by the MBA SEM Forum 2020.

Since 2020, Collegium Humanum has been also a member of CEEMAN, the International Association for Management Development in Dynamic Societies.

Since November 2021, C.H. had been certified partner of the Erasmus+ programme. In the academic year 2022/23, C.H. had approximately 35.000 students.

In 2023, the university received a positive assessment from the Polish Accreditation Committee (PKA) for its psychology program, which was annulled in December 2025. Various C.H. studies were denied registration (Meldung) by Austrian authorities already before the MBA title scandal. In March 2024, a former PKA director was arrested for corruption. He had granted favourable reviews for studies at C.H., while receiving almost 500,000 Złoty and securing jobs for his wife and a sister from C.H.

On 29 February 2024, Prof. Ilona Makowska was appointed as the new provost. She was said to calm down uproar among students amidst severely hampered educational activities. Most proceedings now required consent of a governmental caretaker. Makowska stepped down in April and was succeeded by Paweł Poszytek. In October, Magdalena Stryja, a former prorector responsible for the name change of C.H. to "Varsovia", succeed Poszytek.

As of mid-March 2024, collegium Humanum is under compulsory administration by the authorities and, from summer on, not allowed to issue certificates and degrees. This fact aggravates the situation of the remaining students, barring them from access to other universities. Otherwise, they lose their study progress, yet many left C.H. and started anew.

== Fraud charges and investigations since 2022 ==
In 2022, the Polish Newsweek started to publish reports on Collegium Humanum functioning as a degree mill. The C.H. sued the magazine multiple times, prompting Newsweek to seek redress.

While first investigations started in late 2022, large scale prosecution by CBA took place in February 2024, with seven management cadres, among them provost Paweł Czarnecki, being arrested as a suspect criminal association. Czarnecki was released in mid November. In the meantime, more officials involved in C.H. and/or other suspect organizations had been arrested. Among these are three rectors of private universities, accreditation agency cadres, former C.H. and other university staff and board members of several public companies, such as airports. The former provost faces, as of late autumn 2024, approximately 100 charges, among them sexual harassment of employees. His alleged uncle Ryszard Czarnecki and his wife are inquired for furthering the machinations of C.H. within various Polish departments for material gains.

Among the graduates of C.H. are hundreds of public servants and politicians, many of them being aligned to the PiS party, which ruled Poland until late 2023 and the PO party, which has been part of the governing coalition since December 2023. Due to a legal change in 2017, candidates for board membership in public sector companies had to come up with an MBA, in many cases issued by the newly established C.H within just a few month period of enrollment and for a fraction of the usual cost.

In 2018, accreditation rules for postgraduate studies had been eased significantly, doing away with the compulsory review process. In late March 2024, the council for public companies ruled that C.H. MBA titles are no longer perceived as a form of qualification.

The Ministry for Higher Education is working on an examination process, with false degrees being annulled. A clause is effective whereby mere clients of C.H. won't face charges. In Wrocław and Poznań, key figures within the PO party dominated city authorities hold C.H. degrees, such as Jacek Sutryk.

Collegium Humanum is reported to have functioned in an international network of private educational institutions of dubious repute, while maintaining branches in Austria as well as in Post-communist countries, among them Czechia, Slovakia and Uzbekistan.

The university awarded numerous distinctions to well-known figures in show business such as the singer Doda and Irena Santor as a marketing scheme. Additionally, the university honored politician Tomasz Misiak, who is known for his involvement in numerous scandals and is facing criminal charges in Wrocław, with a Medal of Success. Misiak was actively involved in the university's life and remained associated with the institution by giving lectures, interviews, and speeches on its behalf.

Among international media, the British Spectator came up with an early comment on the issues concerning the C.H. scandal:

"The example of Collegium Humanum looks extreme in its naked opportunism, but it would seem to point to a broader problem of over-reliance on credentials as a proxy for skill, and the blurring of the lines between academic accreditation (useful as that can be) and business acumen. Only the truly skilled will be able to find a way out of this crisis."

Later, another scandal arose in Indonesia, when the Indonesian Constitutional Court published that Arsul Sani, one of their judges, is an alumnus of Collegium Humanum's Jakarta branch. Indonesian media contested his doctoral degree.

== Bachelor's and Master's degree programmes ==
=== Headquarters in Warsaw ===
- first-cycle studies (Bachelor's) in Management
- first-cycle studies (Bachelor's) in Finance and Accounting
- second-cycle studies (Master's) in Management
- second-cycle studies (Master's) in Finance and Accounting
- uniform Master's studies in Psychology
- uniform Master's studies in Law
- uniform Master's studies in Preschool and Early School Education

=== Branch in Poznań ===
- first-cycle studies (Bachelor's) in Management
- second-cycle studies (Master's) in Management
- uniform Master's studies in Psychology

=== Branch in Rzeszów ===
- uniform Master's studies in Psychology
- first-cycle studies (Bachelor's) in Pedagogy
- second-cycle studies (Master's) in Pedagogy

=== Branch in Prague (the Czech Republic) ===
- first-cycle studies (Bachelor's) in Management
- second-cycle studies (Master's) in Management

=== Branch in Frýdek-Místek (the Czech Republic) ===
- first-cycle studies (Bachelor's) in Pedagogy
- second-cycle studies (Master's) in Pedagogy
- first-cycle studies (Bachelor's) in Social Work
- second-cycle studies (Master's) in Social Work

=== Branch in Bratislava (Slovakia) ===
- first-cycle studies (Bachelor's) in Management
- second-cycle studies (Master's) in Management

=== Branch in Andijan (Uzbekistan) ===
- first-cycle studies (Bachelor's) in Management
- second-cycle studies (Master's) in Management

== Postgraduate studies ==
- Executive Master of Business Administration (MBA)
- Executive Master of Business Administration (MBA) – Healthcare Management
- Executive Master of Business Administration (MBA) – IT Management
- Executive Master of Business Administration (MBA) – Tourism Management
- Executive Master of Business Administration (MBA) – Agribusiness Management
- Executive Master of Business Administration (MBA) – Security Management
- Master of Laws (LL.M.) – Law in Business
- Doctor of Business Administration (DBA)
- Internet Marketing (e-Marketing and e-Commerce)
- Psychotraumatology
- Control and Audit
- HR, Finance and Payroll
- Health Educator
- Monitoring of Clinical Trials
- Personal Data Protection Inspector (DPO)

== Publishing ==
The university publishes the following scientific journals:

- International Social and Humanities Studies – Humanum ISSN 1898-8431, 7 points on the ranking list of journals awarded by the Ministry of Science and Higher Education (List B No. 992),
- European Social and Humanities Studies – Prosopon ISSN 1730-0266, 6 points on the ranking list of journals awarded by the Ministry of Science and Higher Education (List B No. 1356),
- International Humanities Studies – Society and Education ISSN 1898-0171, 7 points on the ranking list of journals awarded by the Ministry of Science and Higher Education (List B No. 1667),
- Language and Communication ISSN 2084-5111, 5 points on the ranking list of journals awarded by the Ministry of Science and Higher Education (List B No. 1000).

== Honorary professors of Collegium Humanum ==
- Ryszard Czarnecki
- prof. Václav Klaus, dr. h.c.
- prof. Andrzej Kraśnicki, dr h.c.

== See also ==
- List of universities in Poland
- List of universities in the Czech Republic
- Central Anti-corruption Bureau: Collegium Humanum scandal – further detainees
