= Brno International Business School =

B.I.B.S.
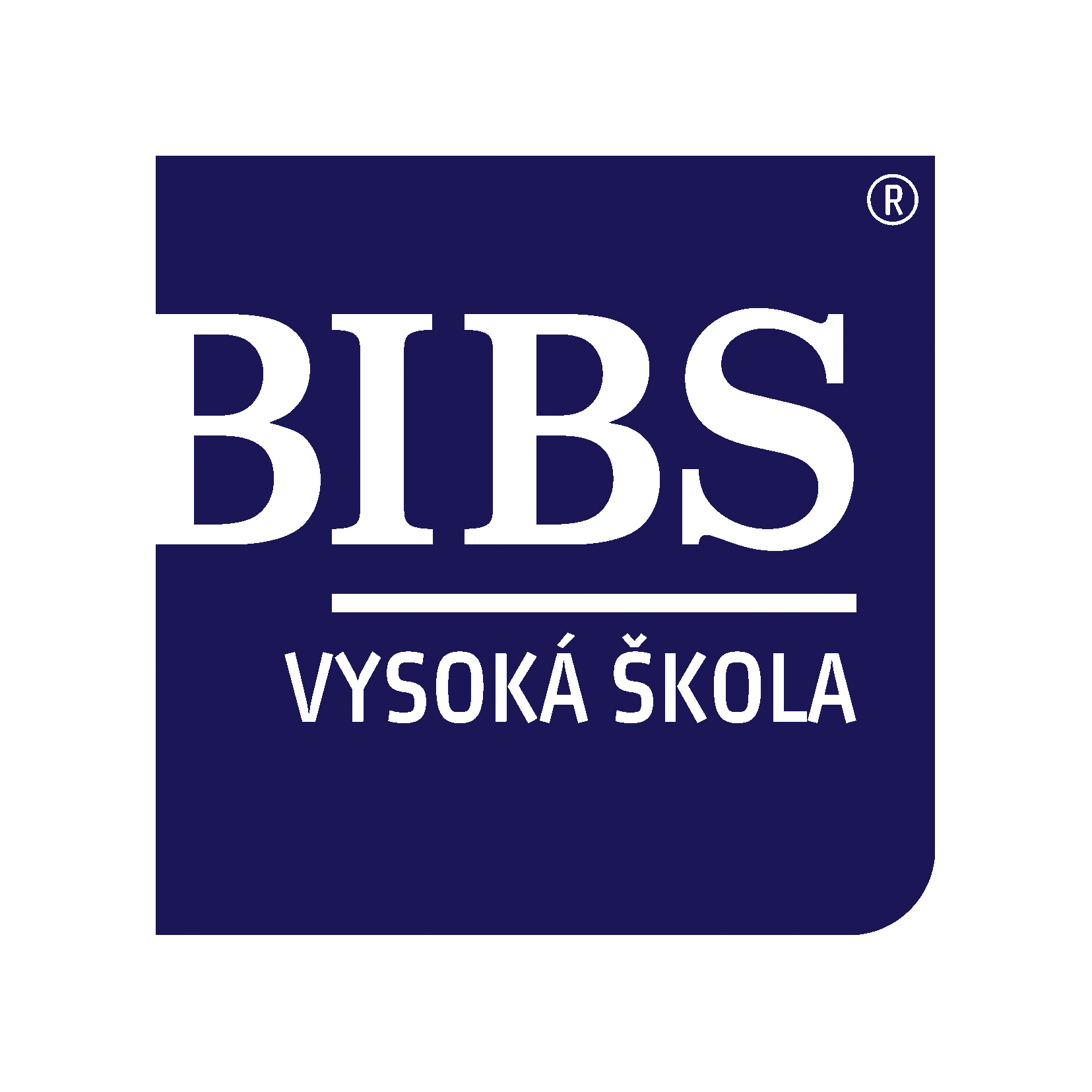

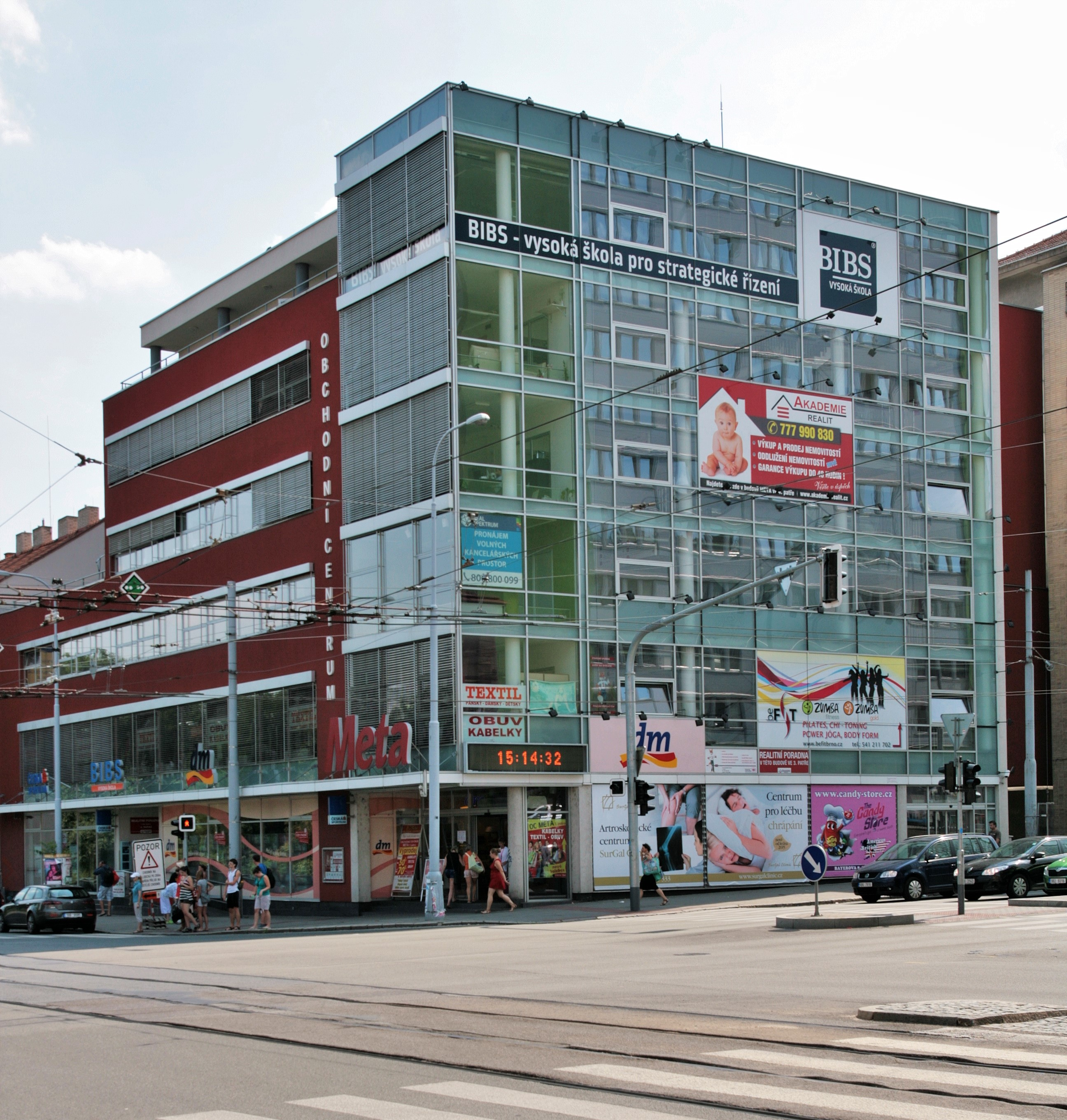
- Street view on central Brno campus

Location
- Lidická 960/81, Brno, 602 00, Česko; Brno; 49.2074091956073°N 16.604202441999963°E

Information
- Other name: Brno International Business School
- Type: Private
- Established: 1998; 28 years ago
- Website: www.bibs.cz

Brno International Business School (B.I.B.S.) is a private institution based in Brno and Prague provides degree programs in business and administration.

== History ==
1998: Foundation of B.I.B.S.

2007: Brno International Business School was reported as one of the main Czech providers of MBA programmes, with nearly 500 graduates in that year alone, and as the institution where the MBA title is most commonly awarded in the Czech Republic.

2008: B.I.B.S. is ranked as the second-best business school in Czech Republic by EDUNIVERSAL in the category “Excellent Business School, nationally strong and with continental links”.

2009: According to the Czech Association of MBA Schools (CAMBAS), B.I.B.S. had become the largest provider of MBA programmes in the Czech Republic, with up to 568 students enrolled.

2011: B.I.B.S. became a member of the AMSP CR, the Association of Small and Medium-Sized Enterprises and Self-Employed Persons of the Czech Republic, with a focus on supporting the development of local small and medium-sized firms.

2012: Creation and delivery of European Commission funded program in Strategic Management for SMEs managers/owners.

By the mid-2010s, international study portals described B.I.B.S. as a private university with nearly 3,000 students in bachelor, master, doctoral and MBA programmes and as one of the larger private business schools in the Czech Republic and the largest MBA business school in the country.[2]

2020: B.I.B.S. is ranked by Eduniversal with three palms.

2022: B.I.B.S. is a member of the Franco-Czech Chamber of Commerce.

== International ==
B.I.B.S. cooperates locally with Mendel University Brno and internationally with the Universita degli Studi di Trento in Italy, the University of Wisconsin Whitewater, Umeå University in Sweden, Nicolaus Copernicus University in Toruń in Poland, the University of Mainz in Germany, City University of Seattle in Slovakia and Jönköping International Business School in Sweden. B.I.B.S. has established a cooperation with the European University Miguel de Cervantes in 2022 to develop joint master and doctoral degree programs.

== Programs ==
B.I.B.S. specializes in both economic-managerial and legal fields. The programs are attractive thanks to a very high success rate of 96%. Its degree portfolio has included British and Czech-accredited programmes such as BA (Hons) in Law and Business Management and MSc in Law and Business Management delivered under licence from Nottingham Trent University.

Bachelor

- Bachelor of Business Administration

Master's degree

- Master in Business Administration
- Executive MBA
- Msc in Sustainable management

Doctoral

- Doctorate in Business and Administration (DBA)

Short - term management courses

In addition to degree programmes, B.I.B.S. offers short-term management courses and other continuing education for professionals.

== Notable alumni ==
- Tomáš Julínek, MBA, former Minister of Health
- Richard Svoboda, MBA, senator and former mayor of Brno
- Tomáš Zima, DrSc., MBA, Dean of the 1st Faculty of Medicine, Charles University
- Daniel Beneš, MBA, CEO and Chairman of the Board of Directors of ČEZ
