= University of New York in Prague =

Private university in Prague, Czech Republic

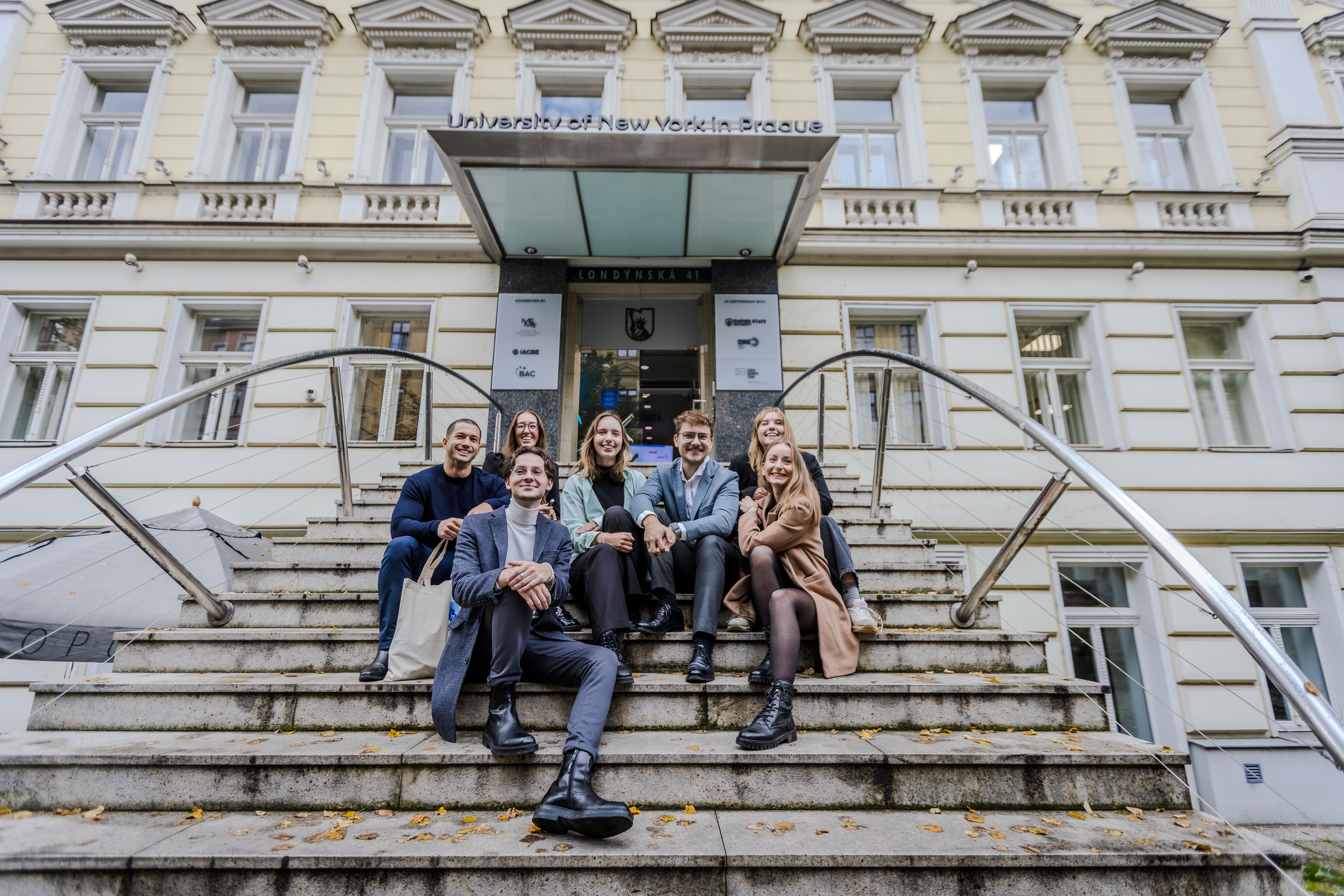
- University of New York in Prague Exterior
- Type: Private
- Established: 1998
- President: Elias Foutsis
- Rector: Andreas Antonopoulos
- Students: 1200
- Location: Londynska 41, Prague 2, Czech Republic, Prague, Czech Republic; 50°4′34.58″N 14°25′49.64″E
- Campus: urban
- Colors: blue and white
- Nickname: UNYP
- Website: http://www.unyp.cz

The University of New York in Prague (UNYP) is a private higher education institution in Prague, Czech Republic. It was established in 1998 in cooperation with the State University of New York at New Paltz and Empire State University, both part of the State University of New York (SUNY). UNYP was recognized by the Czech Ministry of Education, Youth and Sports in 2001 on the basis of accreditation of its study programs in Business Administration and International European Relations. UNYP is a member of the British Accreditation Council for Independent Further and Higher Education.

Originally located in the historic old town of Prague, on the corner of Mikovcova and Legerova streets, UNYP moved to a new campus at Londýnská 41 in Vinohrady (Prague 2) in 2014.

== Accreditation ==
UNYP has been a part of the higher education system of the Czech Republic since 2001, when it was recognized by the Czech Ministry of Education as a private higher education institution, on the basis of the accreditation of its study programs. Currently, six-degree programs at UNYP are accredited by the Czech Ministry of Education and Czech National Accreditation Bureau for Higher Education, and lead to a Bachelor's or master's degree awarded by UNYP:

- Business Administration (Bachelor's degree, 3-year program)
- Business Administration (Bachelor's degree, 4-year program)
- Communication & Media (Bachelor's degree, 4-year program)
- International Relations (Bachelor's degree, 4-year program)
- Psychology (Bachelor's degree, 4-year program)
- Psychology (Master's degree, 2-year program)

UNYP also has permission from the Czech Ministry of Education to offer degree programs from foreign partner universities, leading to the awarding of Bachelor's or master's degrees from those universities. One foreign partner university is the State University of New York, Empire State University.

Internationally, UNYP is accredited by the British Accreditation Council (BAC), and the university's business programs (MBA and 3-year Bachelor's program) are accredited by the US-based International Accreditation Council for Business Education (IACBE). In the Czech Republic, UNYP's MBA program has also been accredited by the Czech Association of MBA Schools since 2003. The MBA programs emphasize practical application of knowledge and skills in professional contexts. UNYP has also introduced programs focused on digital business and online environments.

UNYP joined the U.S. Chamber of Commerce in the Czech Republic in 1999, the Czech Association of MBA Schools (CAMBAS) in 2003, and the Canadian Chamber of Commerce in the Czech Republic in 2014. It is also a member of the Central and East European Management Development Association (CEEMAN), an association of business education providers in Central and Eastern Europe.

== See also ==
- List of universities in the Czech Republic
