= 1st International School of Ostrava =

Coordinates: 49°50′31.30″N 18°17′6.04″E

- Ostrava; Czech Republic

Information
- Type: Private
- Established: 2005
- Colors: Red, yellow, green, blue
- Website: www.is-ostrava.cz

1st International School of Ostrava (ISO) is a private international school in Ostrava, Czech Republic. Founded in 2005 as a secondary school, it has since added a kindergarten and primary school. The secondary school is bilingual, with tuition in Czech and English.

== The school ==
The school was established in 2005 with a single class group. After three years, the number of students was just under 300. In 2006 the school moved to a newly reconstructed building in the centre of Ostrava, and as of 2008 uses four buildings close to each other in that location.

The school has international and Czech students and teachers, and subjects taught in English include geography, biology, chemistry, physics, mathematics, social science, history, English, Czech and Physical Education. The school cooperates with Prague British School, the International School of Prague, and Sunnerbogymnasiet Ljungby in Sweden.

== School activities ==
ISO runs a film club, known as One World in Schools, and a Model United Nations Club, which organizes its own conferences, and participates in others abroad.

The school's sports day is held in December, with students and teachers competing in sports including football, floorball, and basketball. The ISO cricket team was established in 2007, and has since participated in several tournaments and exhibitions. It won second place at an international tournament in Prague, and students of the school represented the Czech Republic in an international exhibition match.

== International partnerships ==
ISO participates in various international exchange programmes, projects, and conferences. ISO has taken part in the Copernicus Programme in Estonia (2006), Ireland (2007), and Belarus (2008), and in the KLIMUN '08 conference in Malaysia. It also held its own international meeting in Prague in 2007.
