= Gymnázium Christiana Dopplera =

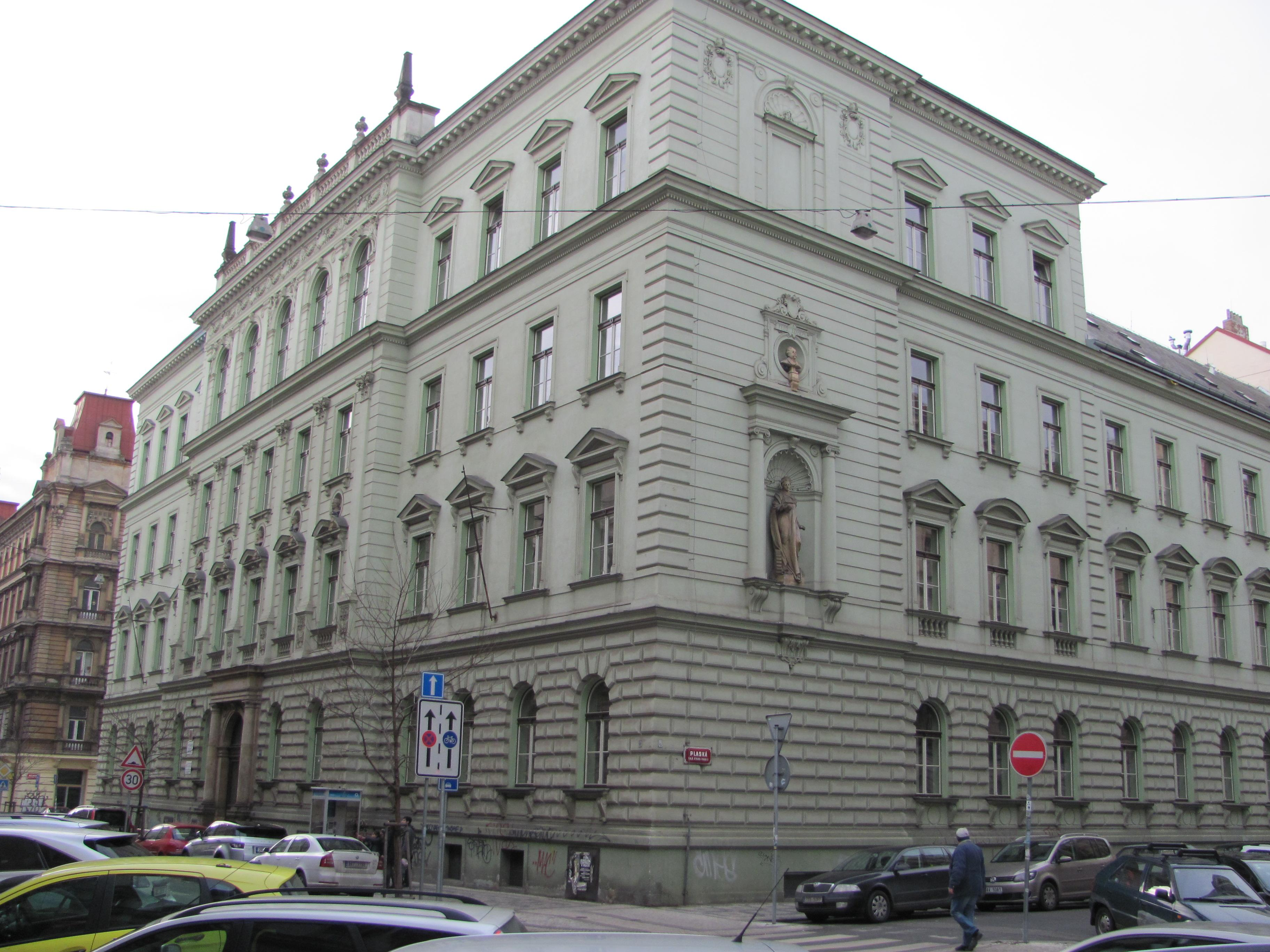

Location
- Zborovská 621/45; Prague, 15000; Czech Republic
- Coordinates: 50°04′49.38″N 14°24′24.74″E

Information
- School type: Public, Selective, Secondary School
- Established: 1953
- School code: 61385701
- Principal: RNDr. Petr Pudivítr, Ph.D
- Faculty: ~52
- Grades: 6–13
- Gender: Coeducational
- Enrollment: ~550
- Language: Czech
- Color: Grey
- Affiliations: Faculty of Mathematics and Physics, Charles University; Faculty of Science, Charles University
- Website: www.gchd.cz

Gymnázium Christiana Dopplera (commonly abbreviated as GChD) is a public secondary school located in the Malá Strana district of Prague, Czech Republic. The school offers both 4-year and 8-year study programs, and students can specialize in mathematics and physics or in foreign languages.

== History ==
The secondary school was founded in September 1953 as the 14th 11-year secondary school by unification of the 3rd national school, the 4th national school, the 3rd high school, and a language-oriented high school in Slezská street. (The term "national school" originally referred to what is now called the first level of primary school, and the term secondary school referred to what is now called the second level of primary school.) The school was formerly located in Wilhelma Piecka street (1990 renamed to Korunní) in Vinohrady, in the building of today's Archbishop Gymnázium.

In 1990, due to the renaming of the street, the school's name Gymnázium Wilhelma Piecka (informally called Píkárna) was changed to Gymnázium Korunní. When the building had to be abandoned for the Archbishop Gymnázium in 1993, the school moved to the building of a former industrial secondary school in Zborovská street, which in turn moved to a new building in Pankrác in 1993 and was renamed as Gymnázium Zborovská.

For long-lasting excellent results in physics competitions, on January 1, 1999 the school received its current name, honoring the 19th-century physicist Christian Doppler known for his discovery of the Doppler effect. The school currently has the status of a faculty school of the Faculty of Science, Charles University and the Faculty of Mathematics and Physics, Charles University.

In 1998, doc. RNDr. Zdeněk Kluiber, a science popularizer who had been teaching physics at the school since 1990, was appointed as the principal. Under his supervision, preparatory courses for Grade 9 students were established, including FYGYK, later renamed as FYGYZ. The course has been gradually transformed into a series of lectures for primary school students on a variety of topics from mathematics, physics, and computer science. Apart from FYGYZ, the students organize science competitions Pražská střela and Dopplerova vlna.

== The present ==
Gymnázium Christiana Dopplera offers 4-year and 8-year study programs ended with the Maturita exam. Every year GChD opens one 4-year class of the educational field 79-41-K/41 Gymnázium - Per partes ad astra focused on mathematics (with a further focus on physics and computer science), one 8-year class of the educational field 79-41-K/81 Gymnázium - Myslím, tedy jsem focused on mathematics (with a further focus on physics and computer science), and one 8-year class of the educational field 79-41-K/81 Gymnázium - Cizí jazyky – brána do světa focused on foreign languages. Every class has a maximum capacity of 30 students.

The mathematics part of the exit exam comprises a 4-hour written exam (which is created by Doc. RNDr. Jaroslav Zhouf, PhD, a member of the Department of Mathematics and Mathematical Education of the Faculty of Education, Charles University), and an oral exam. Students of all three programs are required to study at least two foreign languages at the B2 or C1 SERR levels. Gymnázium Christiana Dopplera is a Deutsches Sprachdiplom-certified school. The diploma (equivalent to the C1 level within the Common European Framework of Reference for Languages) is awarded to the students of the language classes.

The school resides in an 1896 building which has been reconstructed several times during the last few years (building of a new dining hall, modernization of computer equipment).

== International Competitions ==
In past years (since 2006), students of Gymnázium Christiana Dopplera won the following prizes:

=== International Physics Olympiad ===
2013: Lubomír Grund – Silver medal

2012: Lubomír Grund – Silver medal

2010: Jáchym Sýkora – Gold medal

2009: Jáchym Sýkora – Bronze medal

2006: Radek Žlebčík – Bronze medal

=== Middle European Mathematical Olympiad ===
2012: Lubomír Grund – Bronze medal

2011: Lubomír Grund – Honorable mention

2009: Radek Marciňa – Bronze medal

=== International Mathematical Olympiad ===
2010: Jáchym Sýkora – Honorable mention

2010: Radek Marciňa – Honorable mention

=== International Astronomy Olympiad ===
2008: Jana Smutná – Bronze medal

2008: Tereza Kroupová – Honorable mention

2007: Jana Smutná – Honorable mention

=== Intel International Science and Engineering Fair ===
2014: Aranka Hrušková – Silver Medal

== Notable alumni ==
- Jan Fischer – politician, former Prime Minister of the Czech Republic
- Karel Janeček – mathematician and philanthropist; founder and chief executive of RSJ Algorithmic Trading
- Josef Lustig – director and writer; production assistant to Miloš Forman
- Martin Myšička - Czech actor, member of Dejvické divadlo (The Dejvice Theatre)
- David Navara – highest-ranked Czech chess player

== Universities ==
Gymnázium Christiana Dopplera ranks among the most successful Czech high schools in terms of the percentage of graduates admitted to universities and colleges. GChD graduates attend – among others – the following universities:

- Charles University in Prague
- Czech Technical University in Prague
- Institute of Chemical Technology in Prague
- University of Economics, Prague
- Harvard University
- Imperial College London
- University College London
- University of Cambridge
- University of St Andrews
- University of Glasgow
