= List of birds of the Czech Republic =

This is a list of the bird species recorded in the Czech Republic. The avifauna of the Czech Republic includes (as of October 2024) a total of 431 species, but this number may change as a major re-evaluation of both historical and contemporary records is currently underway. Of these 431 species, 8 have been introduced by humans.

This list's taxonomic treatment (designation and sequence of orders, families and species) and nomenclature (common and scientific names) follow the conventions of The Clements Checklist of Birds of the World, 2022 edition. The family accounts at the beginning of each heading reflect this taxonomy, as do the species counts found in each family account. Introduced and accidental species are included in the total counts for the Czech Republic.

The following tags have been used to highlight several categories. The commonly occurring native species do not fall into any of these categories.

- (A) Accidental - a species that rarely or accidentally occurs in the Czech Republic
- (I) Introduced - a species introduced to the Czech Republic as a consequence, direct or indirect, of human actions

== Ducks, geese, and waterfowl ==
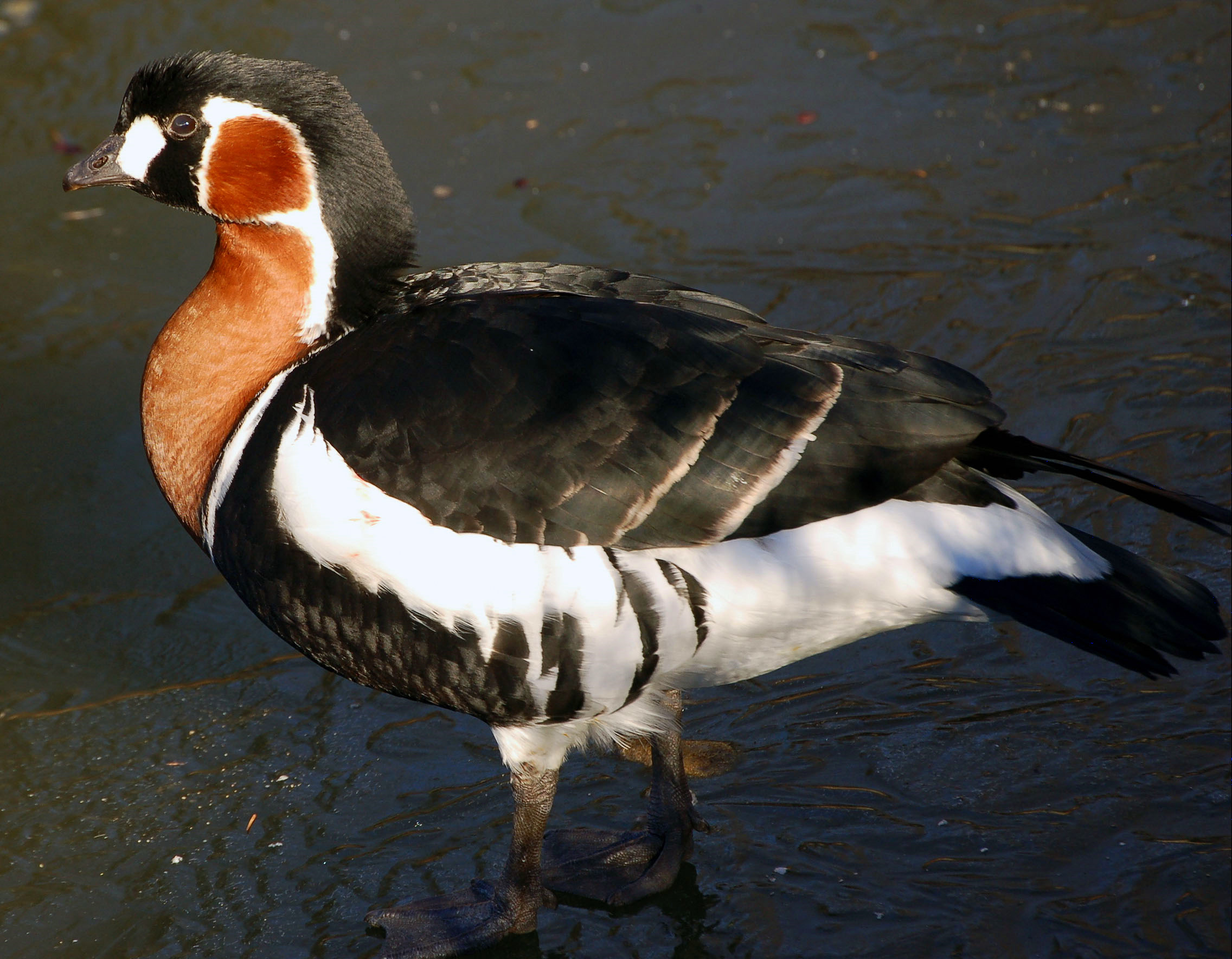
Red-breasted goose

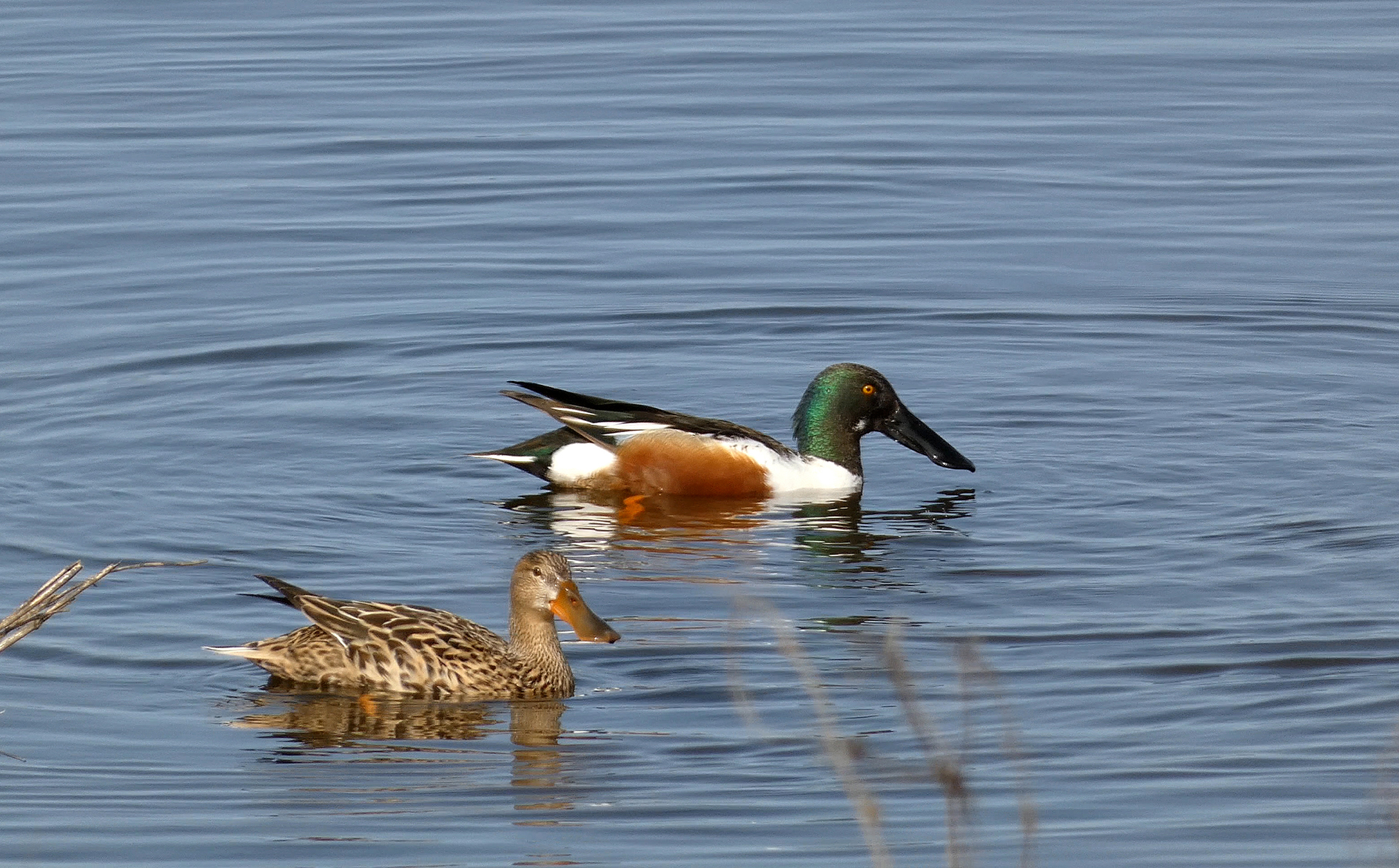
Male and female northern shoveler

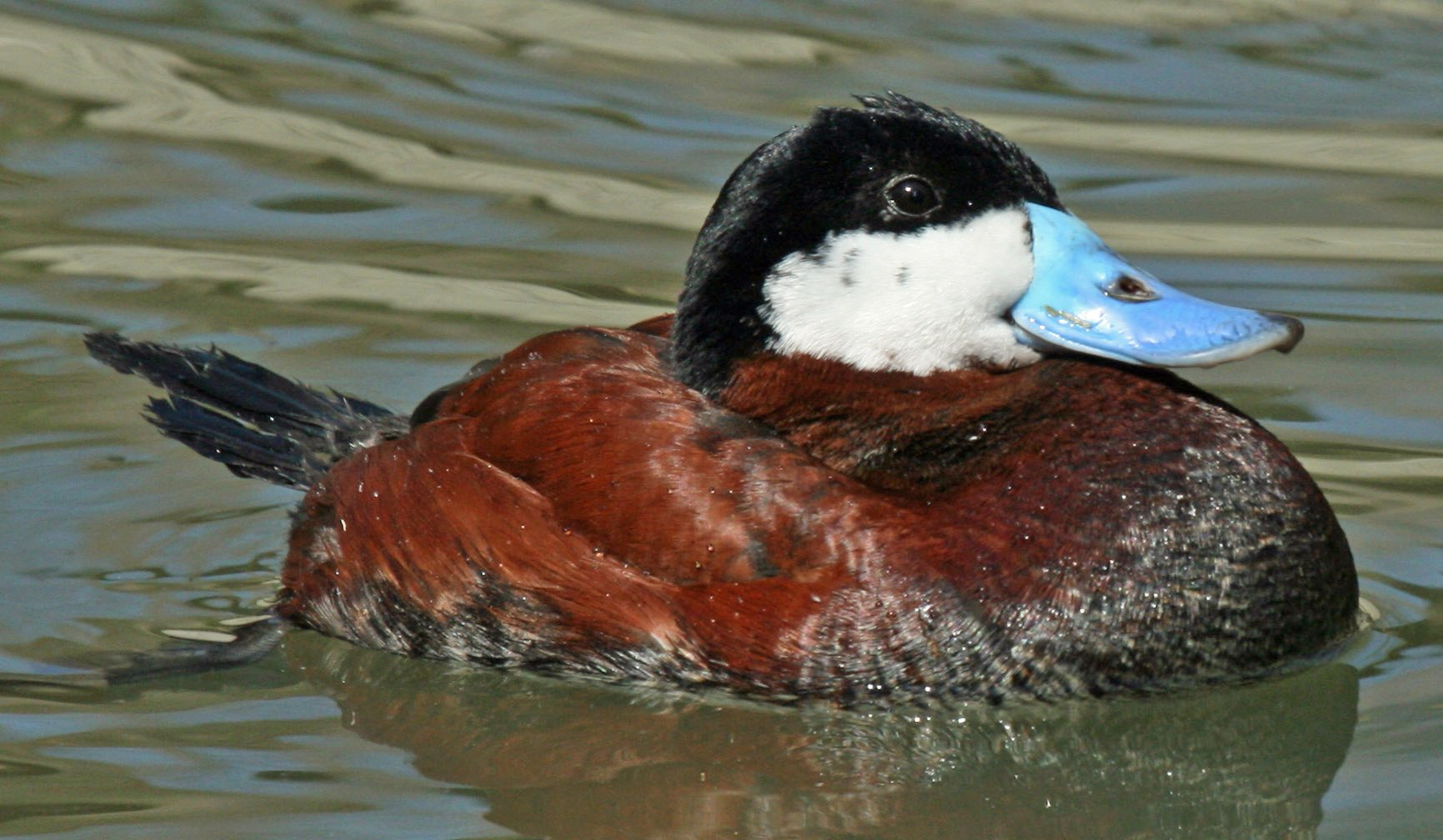
Male ruddy duck

Order: Anseriformes Family: Anatidae

Anatidae includes the ducks and most duck-like waterfowl, such as geese and swans. These birds are adapted to an aquatic existence with webbed feet, flattened bills, and feathers that are excellent at shedding water due to an oily coating.

- Snow goose, Anser caerulescens (A)
- Graylag goose, Anser anser
- Greater white-fronted goose, Anser albifrons
- Lesser white-fronted goose, Anser erythropus (A)
- Taiga bean-goose, Anser fabalis
- Tundra bean-goose, Anser serrirostris
- Pink-footed goose, Anser brachyrhynchus (A)
- Brant, Branta bernicla
- Barnacle goose, Branta leucopsis (A)
- Cackling goose, Branta hutchinsii (A)
- Canada goose, Branta canadensis (I)
- Red-breasted goose, Branta ruficollis (A)
- Mute swan, Cygnus olor
- Tundra swan, Cygnus columbianus (A)
- Whooper swan, Cygnus cygnus
- Egyptian goose, Alopochen aegyptiacus (I)
- Ruddy shelduck, Tadorna ferruginea
- Common shelduck, Tadorna tadorna
- Wood duck, Aix sponsa (I)
- Mandarin duck, Aix galericulata (I)
- Garganey, Spatula querquedula
- Blue-winged teal, Spatula discors (A)
- Northern shoveler, Spatula clypeata
- Gadwall, Mareca strepera
- Eurasian wigeon, Mareca penelope
- American wigeon, Mareca americana (A)
- Mallard, Anas platyrhynchos
- Northern pintail, Anas acuta
- Green-winged teal, Anas crecca
- Marbled teal, Marmaronetta angustirostris (A)
- Red-crested pochard, Netta rufina
- Canvasback, Aythya valisineria (A)
- Common pochard, Aythya ferina
- Ring-necked duck, Aythya collaris (A)
- Ferruginous duck, Aythya nyroca
- Tufted duck, Aythya fuligula
- Greater scaup, Aythya marila
- Steller's eider, Polysticta stelleri (A)
- King eider, Somateria spectabilis (A)
- Common eider, Somateria mollissima
- Velvet scoter, Melanitta fusca
- Common scoter, Melanitta nigra
- Long-tailed duck, Clangula hyemalis
- Common goldeneye, Bucephala clangula
- Barrow's goldeneye, Bucephala islandica (A)
- Smew, Mergellus albellus
- Common merganser, Mergus merganser
- Red-breasted merganser, Mergus serrator
- Ruddy duck, Oxyura jamaicensis (A)
- White-headed duck, Oxyura leucocephala (A)

== Pheasants, grouse, and allies ==
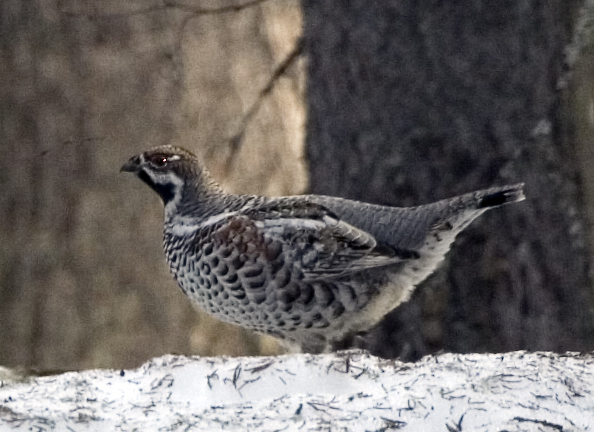
Hazel grouse

Order: Galliformes Family: Phasianidae

The Phasianidae are a family of terrestrial birds. In general, they are plump (although they vary in size) and have broad, relatively short wings.

- Common quail, Coturnix coturnix
- Reeves's pheasant, Syrmaticus reevesii (I)
- Ring-necked pheasant, Phasianus colchicus (I)
- Gray partridge, Perdix perdix
- Western capercaillie, Tetrao urogallus
- Black grouse, Lyrurus tetrix
- Hazel grouse, Tetrastes bonasia

== Flamingoes ==
Order: Phoenicopteriformes Family: Phoenicopteridae

Flamingos are gregarious wading birds, usually 3 to 5 feet (91 to 152 cm) high, found in both the Western and Eastern Hemispheres. Flamingos filter-feed on shellfish and algae. Their oddly shaped beaks are specially adapted to separate mud and silt from the food they consume and, uniquely, are used upside-down.

- Greater flamingo, Phoenicopterus roseus (A)

== Grebes ==
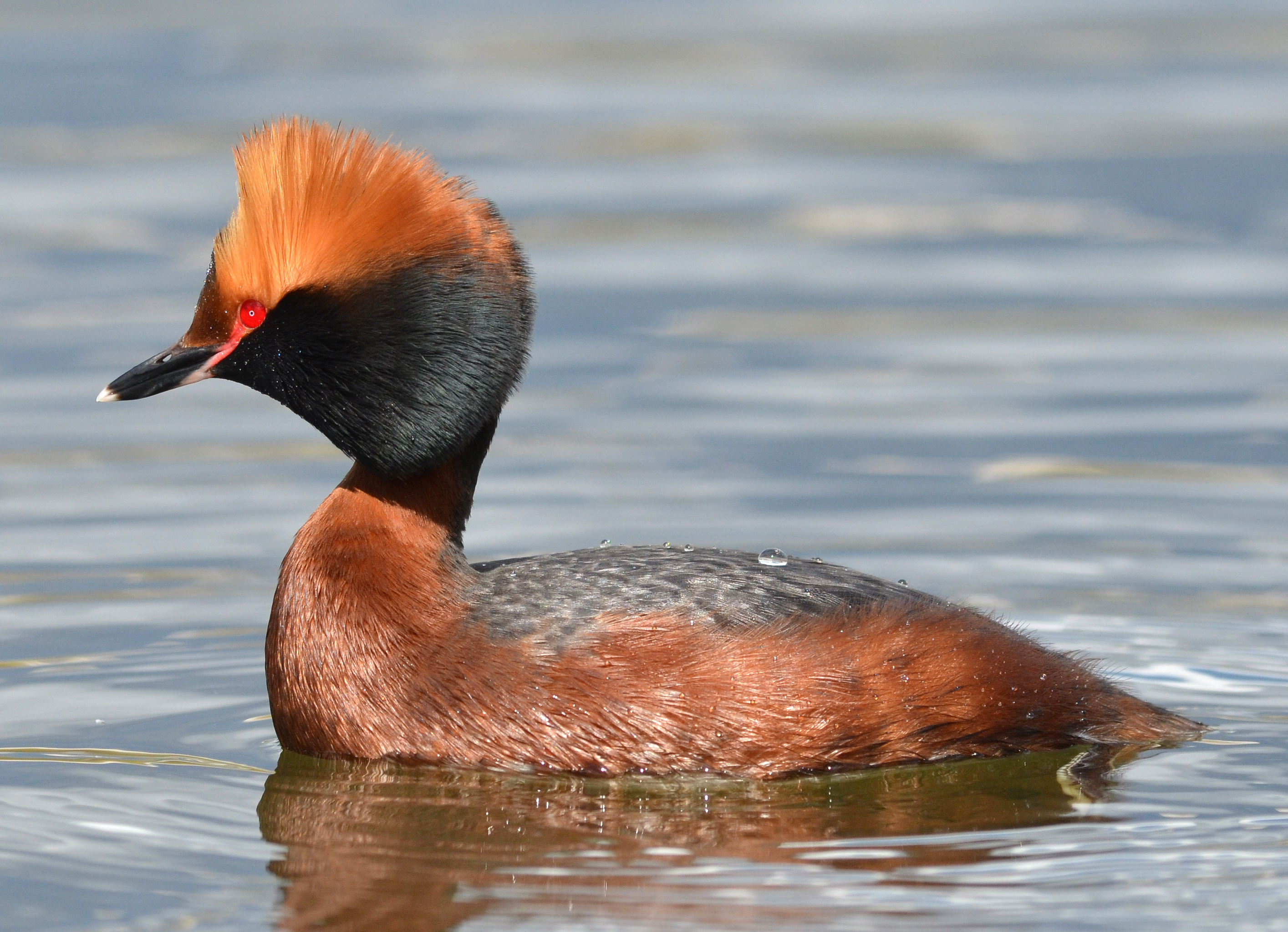
Horned grebe

Order: Podicipediformes Family: Podicipedidae

Grebes are small to medium-large diving birds with lobed toes and pointed bills. They are seen mainly on lowland waterbodies and coasts. They feed on aquatic animals and nest on a floating platform of vegetation.

- Little grebe, Tachybaptus ruficollis
- Horned grebe, Podiceps auritus
- Red-necked grebe, Podiceps grisegena
- Great crested grebe, Podiceps cristatus
- Eared grebe, Podiceps nigricollis

== Pigeons and doves ==
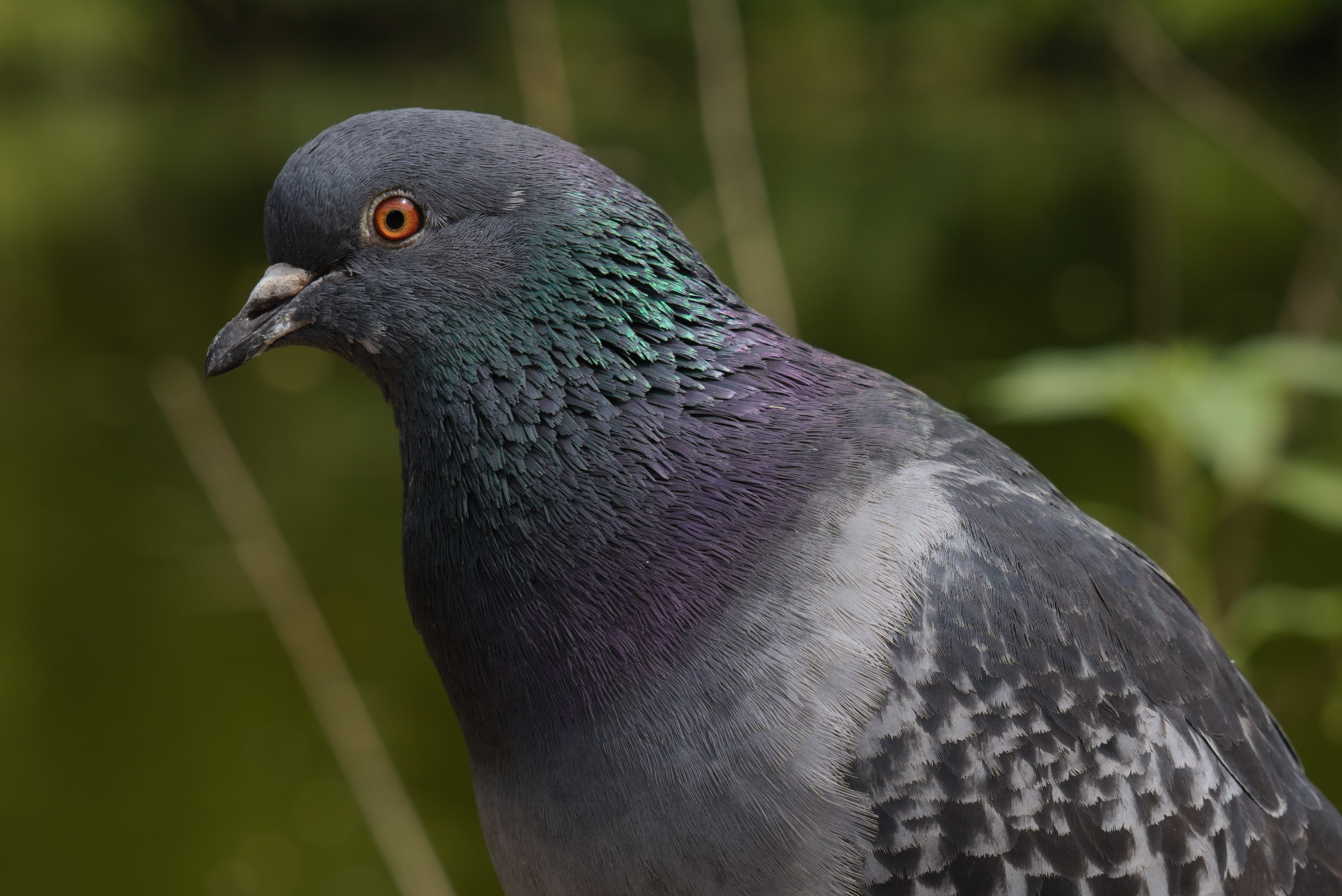
Rock pigeon

Order: Columbiformes Family: Columbidae

Pigeons and doves are stout-bodied birds with short necks and short slender bills with a fleshy cere.

- Rock pigeon, Columba livia (I)
- Stock dove, Columba oenas
- Common wood-pigeon, Columba palumbus
- European turtle-dove, Streptopelia turtur
- Eurasian collared-dove, Streptopelia decaocto

== Sandgrouse ==
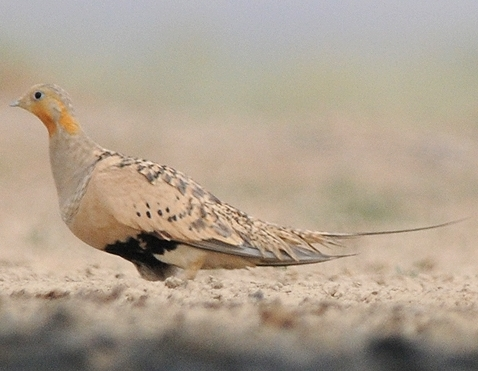
Pallas's sandgrouse

Order: Pterocliformes Family: Pteroclidae

Sandgrouse have small, pigeon like heads and necks, but sturdy compact bodies. They have long pointed wings and sometimes tails and a fast direct flight. Flocks fly to watering holes at dawn and dusk. Their legs are feathered down to the toes.

- Pallas's sandgrouse, Syrrhaptes paradoxus (A)

== Bustards ==
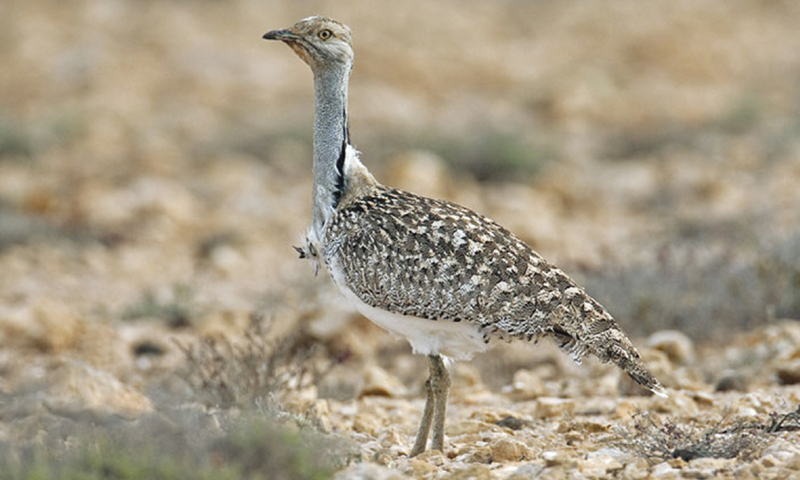
MacQueen's bustard

Order: Otidiformes Family: Otididae

Bustards are large terrestrial birds mainly associated with dry open country and steppes in the Old World. They are omnivorous and nest on the ground. They walk steadily on strong legs and big toes, pecking for food as they go. They have long broad wings with "fingered" wingtips and striking patterns in flight. Many have interesting mating displays.

- Great bustard, Otis tarda
- MacQueen's bustard, Chlamydotis macqueenii (A)
- Little bustard, Tetrax tetrax (A)(extirpated)

== Cuckoos ==
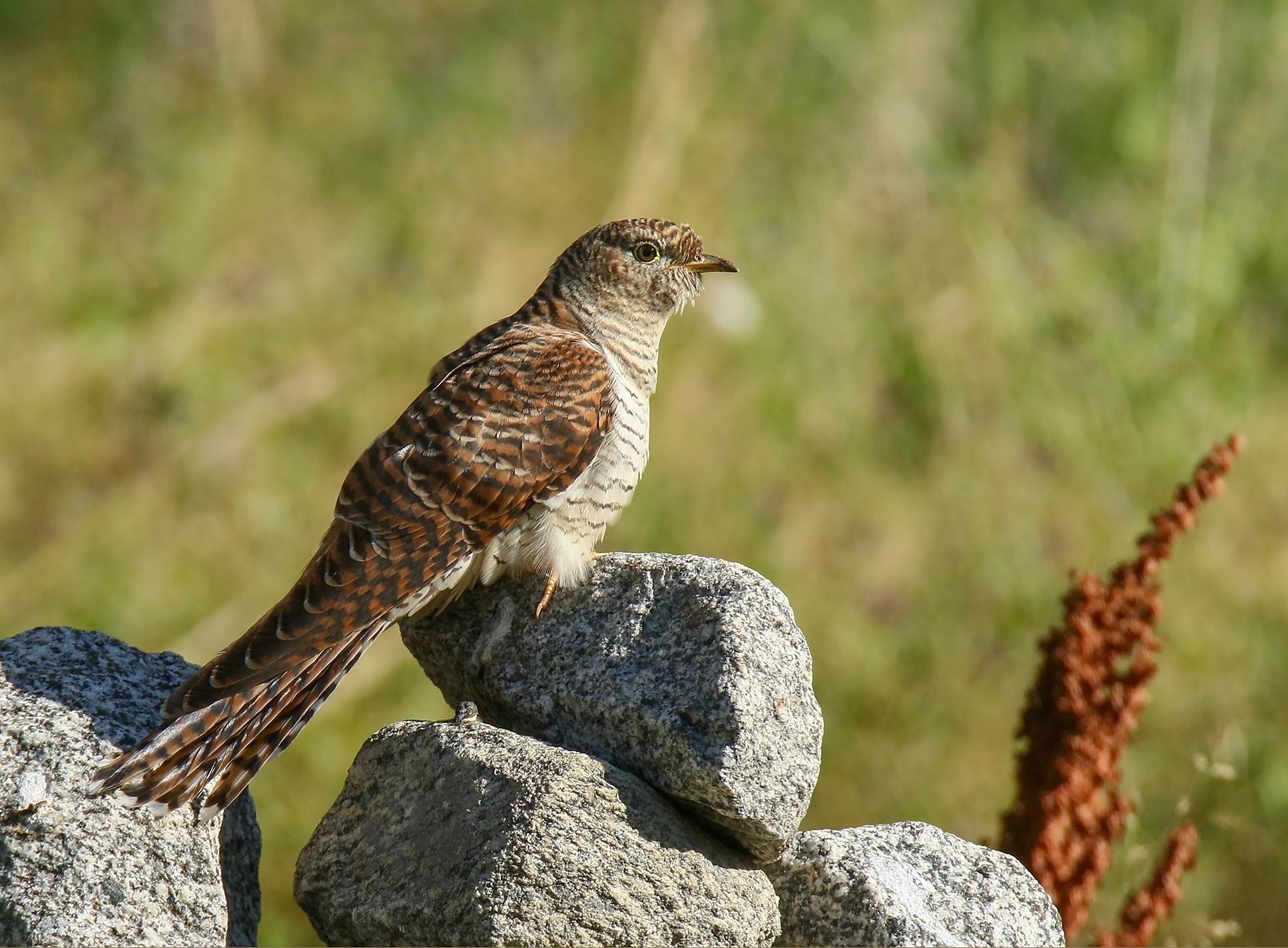
Common cuckoo

Order: Cuculiformes Family: Cuculidae

The family Cuculidae includes cuckoos, roadrunners and anis. These birds are of variable size with slender bodies, long tails and strong legs. The Old World cuckoos are brood parasites.

- Common cuckoo, Cuculus canorus

== Nightjars and allies ==
Order: Caprimulgiformes Family: Caprimulgidae

Nightjars are medium-sized nocturnal birds that usually nest on the ground. They have long wings, short legs and very short bills. Most have small feet, of little use for walking, and long pointed wings. Their soft plumage is camouflaged to resemble bark or leaves.

- Eurasian nightjar, Caprimulgus europaeus

== Swifts ==
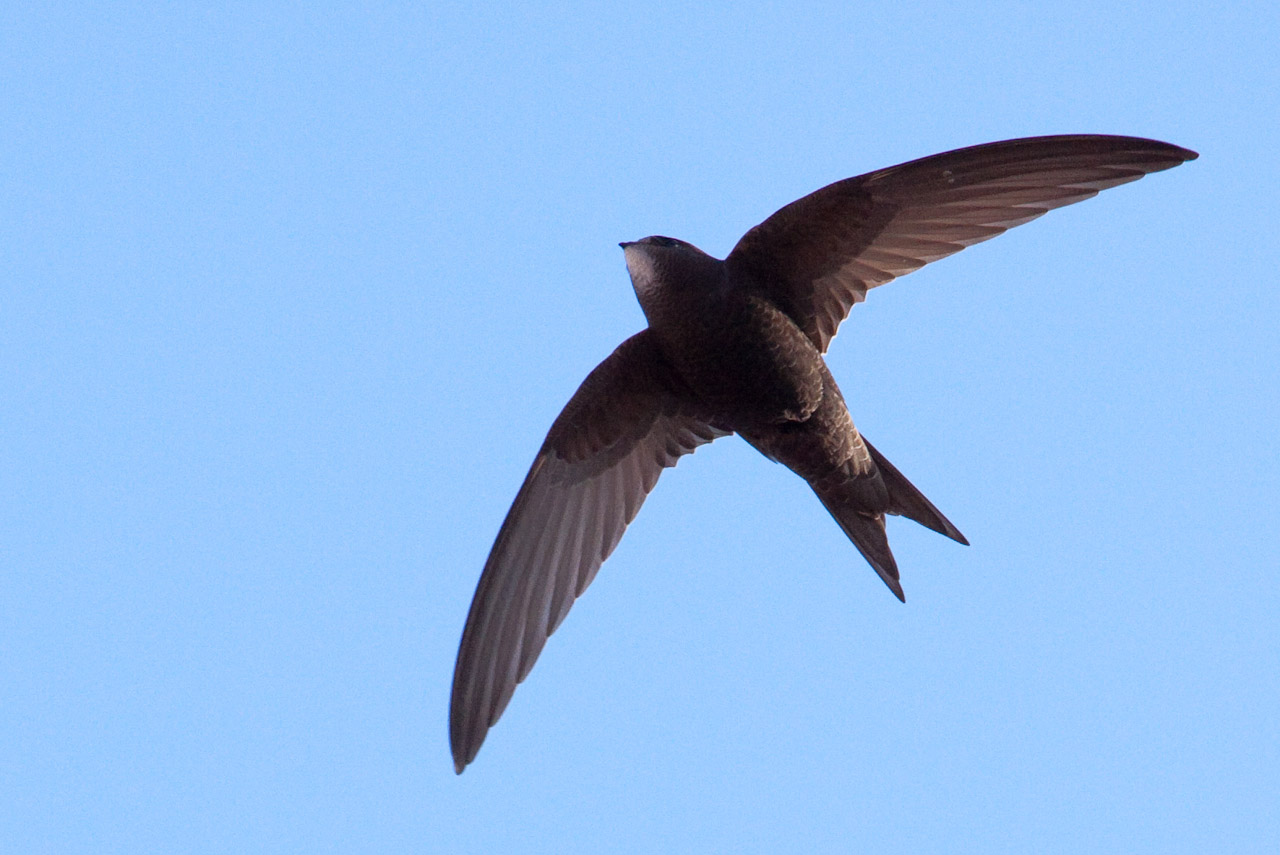
Common swift

Order: Caprimulgiformes Family: Apodidae

Swifts are small birds which spend the majority of their lives flying. These birds have very short legs and never settle voluntarily on the ground, perching instead only on vertical surfaces. Many swifts have long swept-back wings which resemble a crescent or boomerang.

- Alpine swift, Apus melba (A)
- Common swift, Apus apus

== Rails, gallinules and coots ==
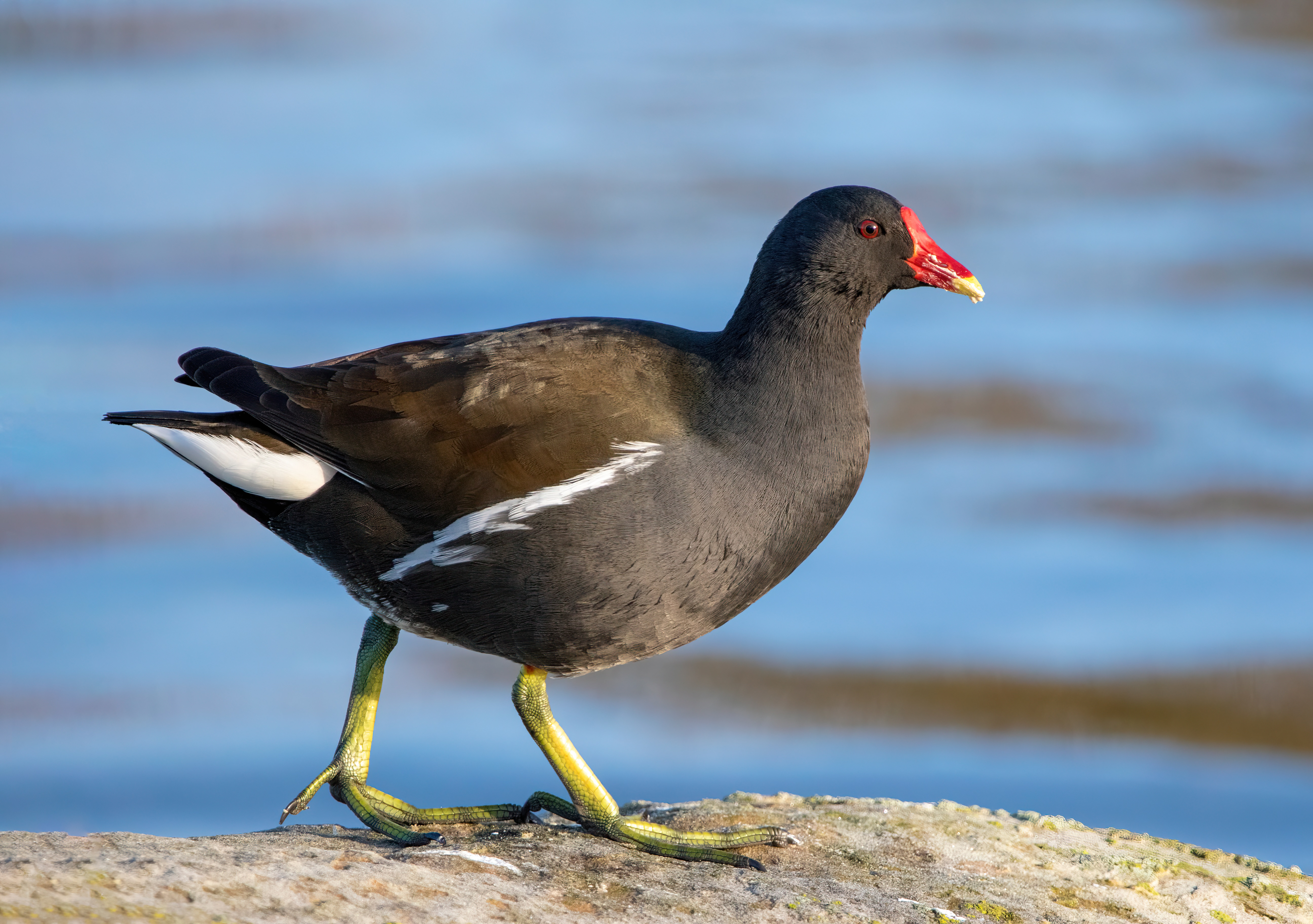
Eurasian moorhen

Order: Gruiformes Family: Rallidae

Rallidae is a large family of small to medium-sized birds which includes the rails, crakes, coots and gallinules. Typically they inhabit dense vegetation in damp environments near lakes, swamps or rivers. In general they are shy and secretive birds, making them difficult to observe. Most species have strong legs and long toes which are well adapted to soft uneven surfaces. They tend to have short, rounded wings and to be weak fliers.

- Water rail, Rallus aquaticus
- Corn crake, Crex crex
- Spotted crake, Porzana porzana
- Eurasian moorhen, Gallinula chloropus
- Eurasian coot, Fulica atra
- Western swamphen, Porphyrio porphyrio (A)
- African swamphen, Porphyrio madagascariensis (A)
- Little crake, Zapornia parva
- Baillon's crake, Zapornia pusilla (A)

== Cranes ==
Order: Gruiformes Family: Gruidae

Cranes are large, long-legged and long-necked birds. Unlike the similar-looking but unrelated herons, cranes fly with necks outstretched, not pulled back. Most have elaborate and noisy courting displays or "dances".

- Common crane, Grus grus

== Thick-knees ==
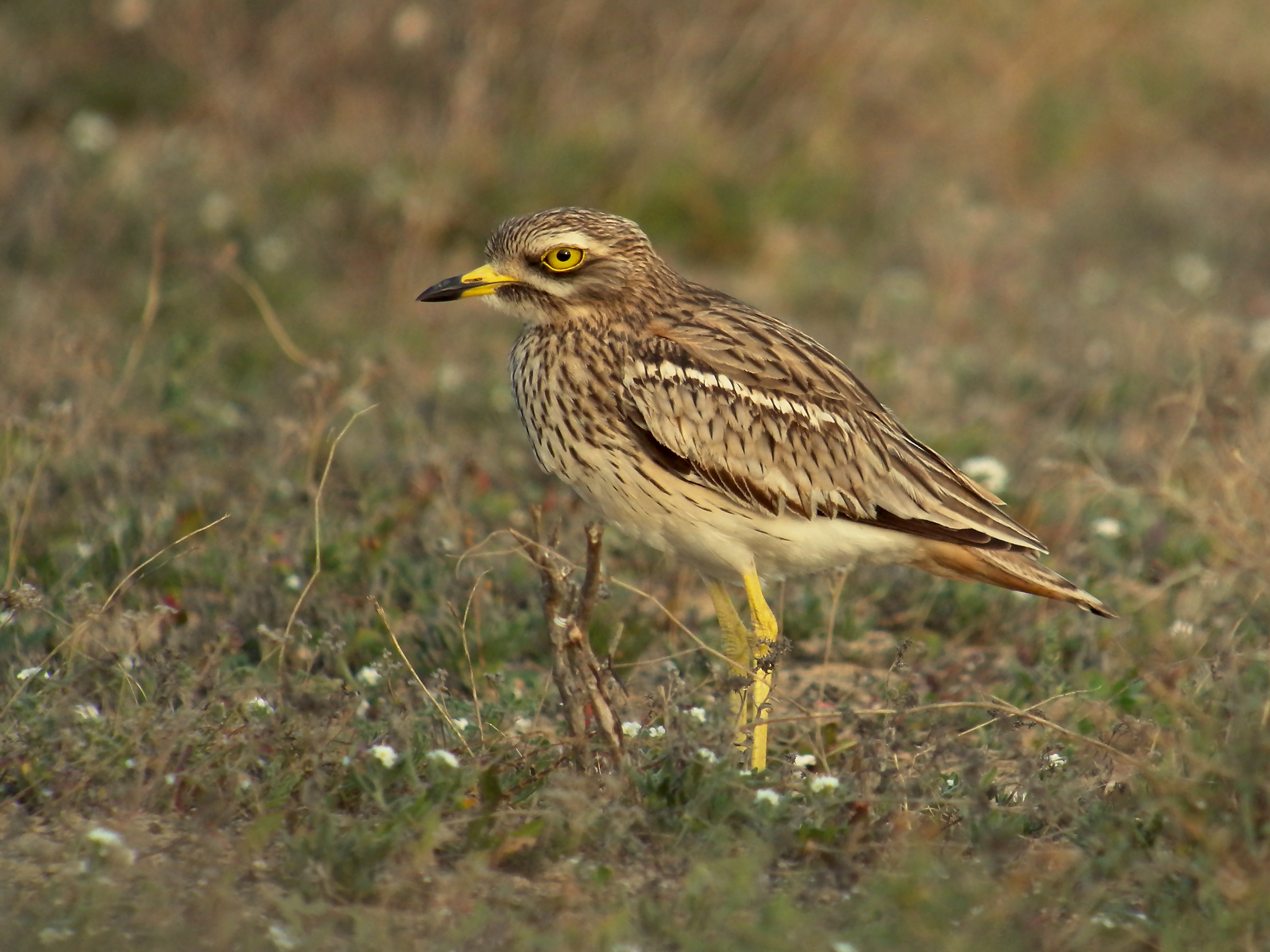
Eurasian thick-knee

Order: Charadriiformes Family: Burhinidae

The thick-knees are a group of largely tropical waders in the family Burhinidae. They are found worldwide within the tropical zone, with some species also breeding in temperate Europe and Australia. They are medium to large waders with strong black or yellow-black bills, large yellow eyes and cryptic plumage. Despite being classed as waders, most species have a preference for arid or semi-arid habitats.

- Eurasian thick-knee, Burhinus oedicnemus

== Stilts and avocets ==
Order: Charadriiformes Family: Recurvirostridae

Recurvirostridae is a family of large wading birds, which includes the avocets and stilts. The avocets have long legs and long up-curved bills. The stilts have extremely long legs and long, thin, straight bills.

- Black-winged stilt, Himantopus himantopus
- Pied avocet, Recurvirostra avosetta

== Oystercatchers ==
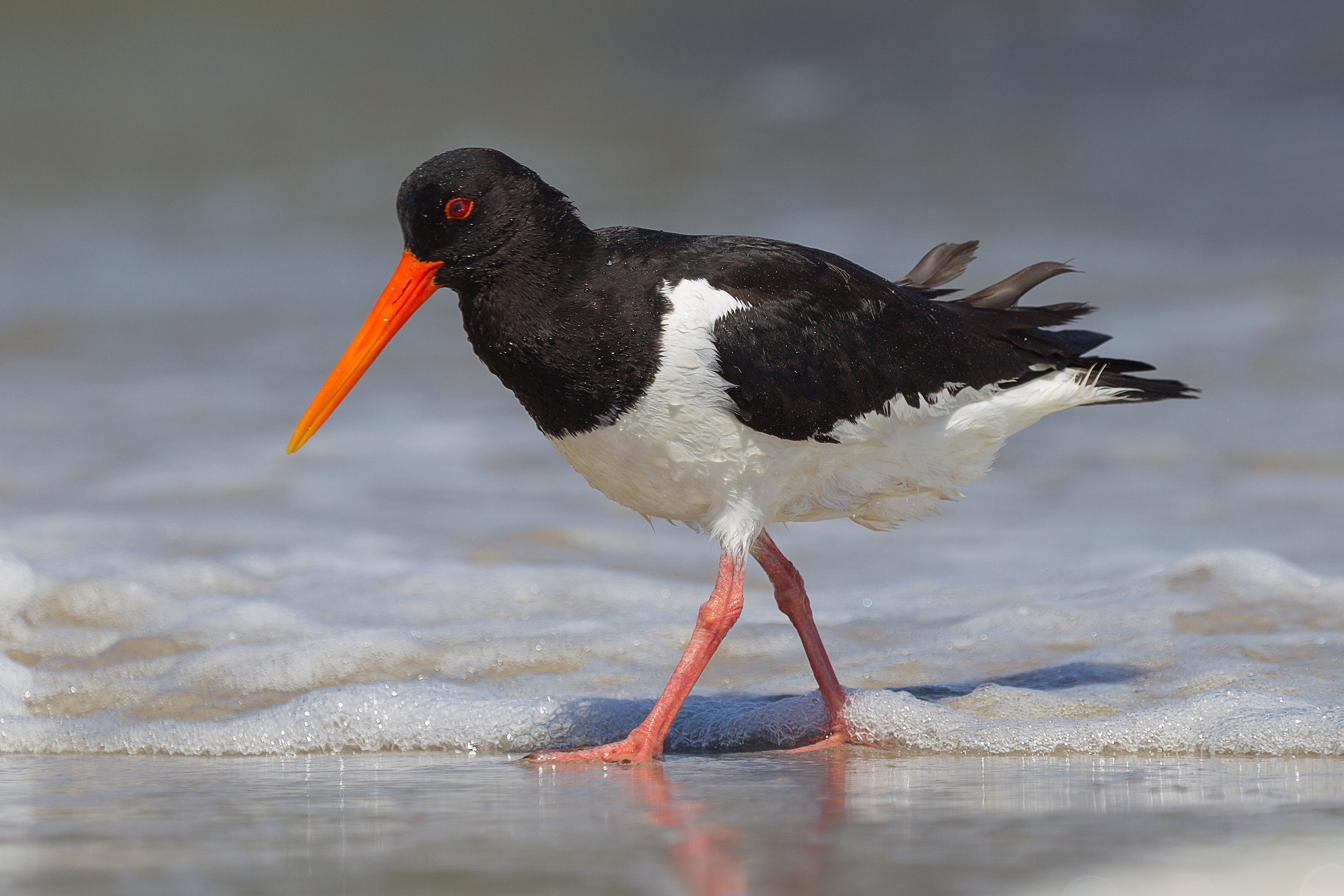
Eurasian oystercatcher

Order: Charadriiformes Family: Haematopodidae

The oystercatchers are large and noisy plover-like birds, with strong bills used for smashing or prising open molluscs.

- Eurasian oystercatcher, Haematopus ostralegus

== Plovers and lapwings ==
Order: Charadriiformes Family: Charadriidae

The family Charadriidae includes the plovers, dotterels and lapwings. They are small to medium-sized birds with compact bodies, short, thick necks and long, usually pointed, wings. They are found in open country worldwide, mostly in habitats near water.

- Black-bellied plover, Pluvialis squatarola
- European golden-plover, Pluvialis apricaria
- American golden-plover, Pluvialis dominica (A)
- Pacific golden-plover, Pluvialis fulva (A)
- Northern lapwing, Vanellus vanellus
- Spur-winged lapwing, Vanellus spinosus (A)
- Sociable lapwing, Vanellus gregarius (A)
- White-tailed lapwing, Vanellus leucurus (A)
- Kentish plover, Charadrius alexandrinus (A)
- Common ringed plover, Charadrius hiaticula
- Little ringed plover, Charadrius dubius
- Eurasian dotterel, Charadrius morinellus

== Sandpipers and allies ==
Order: Charadriiformes Family: Scolopacidae

Scolopacidae is a large diverse family of small to medium-sized shorebirds including the sandpipers, curlews, godwits, shanks, tattlers, woodcocks, snipes, dowitchers and phalaropes. The majority of these species eat small invertebrates picked out of the mud or soil. Variation in length of legs and bills enables multiple species to feed in the same habitat, particularly on the coast, without direct competition for food.

- Whimbrel, Numenius phaeopus
- Slender-billed curlew, Numenius tenuirostris (A)
- Eurasian curlew, Numenius arquata
- Bar-tailed godwit, Limosa lapponica
- Black-tailed godwit, Limosa limosa
- Ruddy turnstone, Arenaria interpres
- Red knot, Calidris canutus
- Ruff, Calidris pugnax
- Broad-billed sandpiper, Calidris falcinellus
- Curlew sandpiper, Calidris ferruginea
- Temminck's stint, Calidris temminckii
- Red-necked stint, Calidris ruficollis (A)
- Sanderling, Calidris alba
- Dunlin, Calidris alpina
- Purple sandpiper, Calidris maritima (A)
- Baird's sandpiper, Calidris bairdii (A)
- Little stint, Calidris minuta
- White-rumped sandpiper, Calidris fuscicollis (A)
- Buff-breasted sandpiper, Calidris subruficollis (A)
- Pectoral sandpiper, Calidris melanotos (A)
- Jack snipe, Lymnocryptes minimus
- Eurasian woodcock, Scolopax rusticola
- Great snipe, Gallinago media
- Common snipe, Gallinago gallinago
- Terek sandpiper, Xenus cinereus (A)
- Red-necked phalarope, Phalaropus lobatus
- Red phalarope, Phalaropus fulicarius (A)
- Common sandpiper, Actitis hypoleucos
- Green sandpiper, Tringa ochropus
- Spotted redshank, Tringa erythropus
- Greater yellowlegs, Tringa melanoleuca (A)
- Common greenshank, Tringa nebularia
- Lesser yellowlegs, Tringa flavipes (A)
- Marsh sandpiper, Tringa stagnatilis
- Wood sandpiper, Tringa glareola
- Common redshank, Tringa totanus

== Pratincoles and coursers ==
Order: Charadriiformes Family: Glareolidae

Glareolidae is a family of wading birds comprising the pratincoles, which have short legs, long pointed wings and long forked tails, and the coursers, which have long legs, short wings and long, pointed bills which curve downwards.

- Cream-colored courser, Cursorius cursor (A)
- Collared pratincole, Glareola pratincola (A)
- Black-winged pratincole, Glareola nordmanni (A)

== Skuas and jaegers ==
Order: Charadriiformes Family: Stercorariidae

The family Stercorariidae are, in general, medium to large birds, typically with grey or brown plumage, often with white markings on the wings. They nest on the ground in temperate and arctic regions and are long-distance migrants.

- Great skua, Stercorarius skua (A)
- Pomarine jaeger, Stercorarius pomarinus
- Parasitic jaeger, Stercorarius parasiticus
- Long-tailed jaeger, Stercorarius longicaudus (A)

== Auks, murres and puffins ==
Order: Charadriiformes Family: Alcidae

Alcids are superficially similar to penguins due to their black-and-white colours, their upright posture and some of their habits, however they are not related to the penguins and differ in being able to fly. Auks live on the open sea, only deliberately coming ashore to nest.

- Dovekie, Alle alle (A)
- Common murre, Uria aalge (A)
- Razorbill, Alca torda (A)
- Black guillemot, Cepphus grylle (A)

== Gulls, terns, and skimmers ==
Order: Charadriiformes Family: Laridae

Laridae is a family of medium to large seabirds, the gulls, terns, and skimmers. Gulls are typically grey or white, often with black markings on the head or wings. They have stout, longish bills and webbed feet. Terns are a group of generally medium to large seabirds typically with grey or white plumage, often with black markings on the head. Most terns hunt fish by diving but some pick insects off the surface of fresh water. Terns are generally long-lived birds, with several species known to live in excess of 30 years.

- Black-legged kittiwake, Rissa tridactyla (A)
- Sabine's gull, Xema sabini (A)
- Slender-billed gull, Chroicocephalus genei (A)
- Bonaparte's gull, Chroicocephalus philadelphia (A)
- Black-headed gull, Chroicocephalus ridibundus
- Little gull, Hydrocoloeus minutus
- Mediterranean gull, Ichthyaetus melanocephalus
- Pallas's gull, Ichthyaetus ichthyaetus (A)
- Audouin's gull, Ichthyaetus audouinii (A)
- Common gull, Larus canus
- Ring-billed gull, Larus delawarensis (A)
- Herring Gull, Larus argentatus
- Yellow-legged gull, Larus michahellis
- Caspian gull, Larus cachinnans
- Iceland gull, Larus glaucoides
- Lesser black-backed gull, Larus fuscus
- Glaucous gull, Larus hyperboreus (A)
- Great black-backed gull, Larus marinus
- Little tern, Sternula albifrons
- Gull-billed tern, Gelochelidon nilotica (A)
- Caspian tern, Hydroprogne caspia
- Black tern, Chlidonias niger
- White-winged tern, Chlidonias leucopterus
- Whiskered tern, Chlidonias hybrida
- Common tern, Sterna hirundo
- Arctic tern, Sterna paradisaea (A)
- Sandwich tern, Thalasseus sandvicensis

== Loons ==
Order: Gaviiformes Family: Gaviidae

Loons, known as divers in Europe, are a group of aquatic birds found in many parts of North America and northern Europe. They are the size of a large duck or small goose, which they somewhat resemble when swimming, but to which they are completely unrelated.

- Red-throated loon, Gavia stellata
- Arctic loon, Gavia arctica
- Common loon, Gavia immer (A)
- Yellow-billed loon, Gavia adamsii (A)

== Southern storm-petrels ==
Order: Procellariiformes Family: Oceanitidae

The southern storm-petrels are relatives of the petrels and are the smallest seabirds. They feed on planktonic crustaceans and small fish picked from the surface, typically while hovering.

- Wilson's storm-petrel, Oceanites oceanicus (A)

== Northern storm-petrels ==
Order: Procellariiformes Family: Hydrobatidae

The northern storm-petrels are the smallest seabirds, feeding on plankton and small fish picked from the surface, typically while hovering. They nest in colonies on the ground, most often in burrows.

- European storm-petrel, Hydrobates pelagicus (A)
- Leach's storm-petrel, Hydrobates leucorhous (A)

== Shearwaters and petrels ==
Order: Procellariiformes Family: Procellariidae

The procellariids are the main group of medium-sized "true petrels", characterised by united nostrils with medium septum and a long outer functional primary.

- Northern fulmar, Fulmarus glacialis (A)
- Cory's shearwater, Calonectris diomedea (A)

== Storks ==
Order: Ciconiiformes Family: Ciconiidae

Storks are large, long-legged, long-necked, wading birds with long, stout bills. Storks are mute, but bill-clattering is an important mode of communication at the nest. Their nests can be large and may be reused for many years. Many species are migratory.

- Black stork, Ciconia nigra
- White stork, Ciconia ciconia

== Boobies and gannets ==
Order: Suliformes Family: Sulidae

The sulids comprise the gannets and boobies. Both groups are medium to large coastal seabirds that plunge-dive for fish.

- Northern gannet, Morus bassanus (A)

== Cormorants and shags ==
Order: Suliformes Family: Phalacrocoracidae

Phalacrocoracidae is a family of medium to large coastal, fish-eating seabirds that includes cormorants and shags. Plumage colouration varies, with the majority having mainly dark plumage, some species being black-and-white and a few being colourful.

- Pygmy cormorant, Microcarbo pygmaeus (A)
- Great cormorant, Phalacrocorax carbo
- European shag, Gulosus aristotelis (A)

== Pelicans ==
Order: Pelecaniformes Family: Pelecanidae

Pelicans are large water birds with a distinctive pouch under their beak. As with other members of the order Pelecaniformes, they have webbed feet with four toes.

- Great white pelican, Pelecanus onocrotalus

== Herons, egrets, and bitterns ==
Order: Pelecaniformes Family: Ardeidae

The family Ardeidae contains the bitterns, herons and egrets. Herons and egrets are medium to large wading birds with long necks and legs. Bitterns tend to be shorter necked and more wary. Members of Ardeidae fly with their necks retracted, unlike other long-necked birds such as storks, ibises and spoonbills.

- Great bittern, Botaurus stellaris
- Little bittern, Ixobrychus minutus
- Gray heron, Ardea cinerea
- Purple heron, Ardea purpurea
- Great egret, Ardea alba
- Little egret, Egretta garzetta
- Cattle egret, Bubulcus ibis
- Squacco heron, Ardeola ralloides (A)
- Black-crowned night-heron, Nycticorax nycticorax

== Ibises and spoonbills ==
Order: Pelecaniformes Family: Threskiornithidae

Threskiornithidae is a family of large terrestrial and wading birds which includes the ibises and spoonbills. They have long, broad wings with 11 primary and about 20 secondary feathers. They are strong fliers and despite their size and weight, very capable soarers.

- Glossy ibis, Plegadis falcinellus (A)
- African sacred ibis, Threskiornis aethiopicus (I)
- Eurasian spoonbill, Platalea leucorodia

== Osprey ==
Order: Accipitriformes Family: Pandionidae

The family Pandionidae contains only one species, the osprey. The osprey is a medium-large raptor which is a specialist fish-eater with a worldwide distribution.

- Osprey, Pandion haliaetus

== Hawks, eagles, and kites ==
Order: Accipitriformes Family: Accipitridae

Accipitridae is a family of birds of prey, which includes hawks, eagles, kites, harriers and Old World vultures. These birds have powerful hooked beaks for tearing flesh from their prey, strong legs, powerful talons and keen eyesight.

- Black-winged kite, Elanus caeruleus (A)
- Egyptian vulture, Neophron percnopterus (A)
- European honey-buzzard, Pernis apivorus
- Cinereous vulture, Aegypius monachus (A)
- Eurasian griffon, Gyps fulvus (A)
- Short-toed snake-eagle, Circaetus gallicus (A)
- Lesser spotted eagle, Clanga pomarina
- Greater spotted eagle, Clanga clanga
- Booted eagle, Hieraaetus pennatus (A)
- Steppe eagle, Aquila nipalensis (A)
- Imperial eagle, Aquila heliaca
- Golden eagle, Aquila chrysaetos
- Bonelli's eagle, Aquila fasciata (A)
- Eurasian marsh-harrier, Circus aeruginosus
- Hen harrier, Circus cyaneus
- Pallid harrier, Circus macrourus (A)
- Montagu's harrier, Circus pygargus
- Levant sparrowhawk, Accipiter brevipes (A)
- Eurasian sparrowhawk, Accipiter nisus
- Eurasian goshawk, Accipiter gentilis
- Red kite, Milvus milvus
- Black kite, Milvus migrans
- White-tailed eagle, Haliaeetus albicilla
- Rough-legged hawk, Buteo lagopus
- Common buzzard, Buteo buteo
- Long-legged buzzard, Buteo rufinus (A)

== Barn-owls ==
Order: Strigiformes Family: Tytonidae

Barn-owls are medium to large owls with large heads and characteristic heart-shaped faces. They have long strong legs with powerful talons.

- Western barn owl, Tyto alba

== Owls ==
Order: Strigiformes Family: Strigidae

The typical owls are small to large solitary nocturnal birds of prey. They have large forward-facing eyes and ears, a hawk-like beak and a conspicuous circle of feathers around each eye called a facial disk.

- Eurasian scops-owl, Otus scops
- Eurasian eagle-owl, Bubo bubo
- Snowy owl, Bubo scandiacus (A)
- Northern hawk owl, Surnia ulula (A)
- Eurasian pygmy-owl, Glaucidium passerinum
- Little owl, Athene noctua
- Tawny owl, Strix aluco
- Ural owl, Strix uralensis
- Long-eared owl, Asio otus
- Short-eared owl, Asio flammeus
- Boreal owl, Aegolius funereus

== Hoopoes ==
Order: Bucerotiformes Family: Upupidae

Hoopoes have black, white and orangey-pink colouring with a large erectile crest on their head.

- Eurasian hoopoe, Upupa epops

== Kingfishers ==
Order: Coraciiformes Family: Alcedinidae

Kingfishers are medium-sized birds with large heads, long, pointed bills, short legs and stubby tails.

- Common kingfisher, Alcedo atthis

== Bee-eaters ==
Order: Coraciiformes Family: Meropidae

The bee-eaters are a group of coraciiform birds in the family Meropidae. Most species are found in Africa but others occur in southern Europe, Madagascar, Australia and New Guinea. They are characterised by richly coloured plumage, slender bodies and usually elongated central tail feathers. All are colourful and have long downturned bills and pointed wings, which give them a swallow-like appearance when seen from afar.

- European bee-eater, Merops apiaster

== Rollers ==
Order: Coraciiformes Family: Coraciidae

Rollers resemble crows in size and build, but are more closely related to the kingfishers and bee-eaters. They share the colourful appearance of those groups with blues and browns predominating. The two inner front toes are connected, but the outer toe is not.

- European roller, Coracias garrulus (A)

== Woodpeckers ==
Order: Piciformes Family: Picidae

Woodpeckers are small to medium-sized birds with chisel-like beaks, short legs, stiff tails and long tongues used for capturing insects. Some species have feet with two toes pointing forward and two backward, while several species have only three toes. Many woodpeckers have the habit of tapping noisily on tree trunks with their beaks.

- Eurasian wryneck, Jynx torquilla
- Eurasian three-toed woodpecker, Picoides tridactylus
- Middle spotted woodpecker, Dendrocoptes medius
- White-backed woodpecker, Dendrocopos leucotos
- Great spotted woodpecker, Dendrocopos major
- Syrian woodpecker, Dendrocopos syriacus
- Lesser spotted woodpecker, Dryobates minor
- Gray-headed woodpecker, Picus canus
- Eurasian green woodpecker, Picus viridis
- Black woodpecker, Dryocopus martius

== Falcons and caracaras ==
Order: Falconiformes Family: Falconidae

Falconidae is a family of diurnal birds of prey. They differ from hawks, eagles and kites in that they kill with their beaks instead of their talons.

- Lesser kestrel, Falco naumanni (extirpated)
- Eurasian kestrel, Falco tinnunculus
- Red-footed falcon, Falco vespertinus
- Eleonora's falcon, Falco eleonorae (A)
- Merlin, Falco columbarius
- Eurasian hobby, Falco subbuteo
- Lanner falcon, Falco biarmicus (A)
- Saker falcon, Falco cherrug
- Gyrfalcon, Falco rusticolus (A)
- Peregrine falcon, Falco peregrinus

== Old World parrots ==
Order: Psittaciformes Family: Psittaculidae

Characteristic features of parrots include a strong curved bill, an upright stance, strong legs, and clawed zygodactyl feet. Many parrots are vividly colored, and some are multi-colored. In size they range from 8 cm (3.1 in) to 1 m (3.3 ft) in length. Old World parrots are found from Africa east across south and southeast Asia and Oceania to Australia and New Zealand.

- Rose-ringed parakeet, Psittacula krameri (A)

== Old World orioles ==
Order: Passeriformes Family: Oriolidae

The Old World orioles are colourful passerine birds. They are not related to the New World orioles.

- Eurasian golden oriole, Oriolus oriolus

== Shrikes ==
Order: Passeriformes Family: Laniidae

Shrikes are passerine birds known for their habit of catching other birds and small animals and impaling the uneaten portions of their bodies on thorns. A typical shrike's beak is hooked, like a bird of prey.

- Red-backed shrike, Lanius collurio
- Great gray shrike, Lanius excubitor
- Lesser gray shrike, Lanius minor (A)
- Woodchat shrike, Lanius senator (A)

== Crows, jays, and magpies ==
Order: Passeriformes Family: Corvidae

The family Corvidae includes crows, ravens, jays, choughs, magpies, treepies, nutcrackers and ground jays. Corvids are above average in size among the Passeriformes, and some of the larger species show high levels of intelligence.

- Eurasian jay, Garrulus glandarius
- Eurasian magpie, Pica pica
- Eurasian nutcracker, Nucifraga caryocatactes
- Yellow-billed chough, Pyrrhocorax graculus (A)
- Eurasian jackdaw, Corvus monedula
- Rook, Corvus frugilegus
- Carrion crow, Corvus corone
- Hooded crow, Corvus cornix
- Common raven, Corvus corax

== Tits, chickadees, and titmice ==
Order: Passeriformes Family: Paridae

The Paridae are mainly small stocky woodland species with short stout bills. Some have crests. They are adaptable birds, with a mixed diet including seeds and insects.

- Coal tit, Periparus ater
- Crested tit, Lophophanes cristatus
- Marsh tit, Poecile palustris
- Willow tit, Poecile montana
- Eurasian blue tit, Cyanistes caeruleus
- Azure tit, Cyanistes cyanus
- Great tit, Parus major

== Penduline-tits ==
Order: Passeriformes Family: Remizidae

The penduline tits are a group of small passerine birds related to the true tits. They are insectivores.

- Eurasian penduline-tit, Remiz pendulinus

== Larks ==
Order: Passeriformes Family: Alaudidae

Larks are small terrestrial birds with often extravagant songs and display flights. Most larks are fairly dull in appearance. Their food is insects and seeds.

- Horned lark, Eremophila alpestris
- Greater short-toed lark, Calandrella brachydactyla (A)
- Calandra lark, Melanocorypha calandra (A)
- Wood lark, Lullula arborea
- Eurasian skylark, Alauda arvensis
- Crested lark, Galerida cristata

== Bearded reedling ==
Order: Passeriformes Family: Panuridae

This species, the only one in its family, is found in reed beds throughout temperate Europe and Asia.

- Bearded reedling, Panurus biarmicus

== Reed warblers and allies ==
Order: Passeriformes Family: Acrocephalidae

The members of this family are usually rather large for "warblers". Most are rather plain olivaceous brown above with much yellow to beige below. They are usually found in open woodland, reedbeds, or tall grass. The family occurs mostly in southern to western Eurasia and surroundings, but it also ranges far into the Pacific, with some species in Africa.

- Booted warbler, Iduna caligata (A)
- Sykes's warbler, Iduna rama (A)
- Eastern olivaceous warbler, Iduna pallida (A)
- Melodious warbler, Hippolais polyglotta (A)
- Icterine warbler, Hippolais icterina
- Aquatic warbler, Acrocephalus paludicola
- Moustached warbler, Acrocephalus melanopogon
- Sedge warbler, Acrocephalus schoenobaenus
- Paddyfield warbler, Acrocephalus agricola (A)
- Blyth's reed warbler, Acrocephalus dumetorum (A)
- Marsh warbler, Acrocephalus palustris
- Eurasian reed warbler, Acrocephalus scirpaceus
- Great reed warbler, Acrocephalus arundinaceus

== Grassbirds and allies ==
Order: Passeriformes Family: Locustellidae

Locustellidae are a family of small insectivorous songbirds found mainly in Eurasia, Africa, and the Australian region. They are smallish birds with tails that are usually long and pointed, and tend to be drab brownish or buffy all over.

- River warbler, Locustella fluviatilis
- Savi's warbler, Locustella luscinioides
- Common grasshopper-warbler, Locustella naevia

== Swallows ==
Order: Passeriformes Family: Hirundinidae

The family Hirundinidae is adapted to aerial feeding. They have a slender streamlined body, long pointed wings and a short bill with a wide gape. The feet are adapted to perching rather than walking, and the front toes are partially joined at the base.

- Bank swallow, Riparia riparia
- Eurasian crag-martin, Ptyonoprogne rupestris (A)
- Barn swallow, Hirundo rustica
- Red-rumped swallow, Cecropis daurica (A)
- Common house-martin, Delichon urbicum

== Leaf warblers ==
Order: Passeriformes Family: Phylloscopidae

Leaf warblers are a family of small insectivorous birds found mostly in Eurasia and ranging into Wallacea and Africa. The species are of various sizes, often green-plumaged above and yellow below, or more subdued with grayish-green to grayish-brown colors.

- Wood warbler, Phylloscopus sibilatrix
- Western Bonelli's warbler, Phylloscopus bonelli (A)
- Yellow-browed warbler, Phylloscopus inornatus (A)
- Pallas's leaf warbler, Phylloscopus proregulus (A)
- Radde's warbler, Phylloscopus schwarzi (A)
- Dusky warbler, Phylloscopus fuscatus (A)
- Willow warbler, Phylloscopus trochilus
- Common chiffchaff, Phylloscopus collybita (A)
- Iberian chiffchaff, Phylloscopus ibericus (A)
- Greenish warbler, Phylloscopus trochiloides

== Bush warblers and allies ==
Order: Passeriformes Family: Scotocercidae

The members of this family are found throughout Africa, Asia, and Polynesia. Their taxonomy is in flux, and some authorities place some genera in other families.

- Cetti's warbler, Cettia cetti (A)

== Long-tailed tits ==
Order: Passeriformes Family: Aegithalidae

Long-tailed tits are a group of small passerine birds with medium to long tails. They make woven bag nests in trees. Most eat a mixed diet which includes insects.

- Long-tailed tit, Aegithalos caudatus

== Sylviid warblers, parrotbills, and allies ==
Order: Passeriformes Family: Sylviidae

The family Sylviidae is a group of small insectivorous passerine birds. They mainly occur as breeding species, as the common name implies, in Europe, Asia and, to a lesser extent, Africa. Most are of generally undistinguished appearance, but many have distinctive songs.

- Eurasian blackcap, Sylvia atricapilla
- Garden warbler, Sylvia borin
- Asian desert warbler, Curruca nana (A)
- Barred warbler, Curruca nisoria
- Lesser whitethroat, Curruca curruca
- Eastern subalpine warbler, Curruca cantillans (A)
- Sardinian warbler, Curruca melanocephala (A)
- Greater whitethroat, Curruca communis
- Dartford warbler, Curruca undata (A)

== Kinglets ==
Order: Passeriformes Family: Regulidae

The kinglets, also called crests, are a small group of birds often included in the Old World warblers, but frequently given family status because they also resemble the titmice.

- Goldcrest, Regulus regulus
- Common firecrest, Regulus ignicapillus

== Wallcreeper ==
Order: Passeriformes Family: Tichodromidae

The wallcreeper is a small bird related to the nuthatch family, which has stunning crimson, grey and black plumage.

- Wallcreeper, Tichodroma muraria

== Nuthatches ==
Order: Passeriformes Family: Sittidae

Nuthatches are small woodland birds. They have the unusual ability to climb down trees head first, unlike other birds which can only go upwards. Nuthatches have big heads, short tails and powerful bills and feet.

- Eurasian nuthatch, Sitta europaea

== Treecreepers ==
Order: Passeriformes Family: Certhiidae

Treecreepers are small woodland birds, brown above and white below. They have thin pointed down-curved bills, which they use to extricate insects from bark. They have stiff tail feathers, like woodpeckers, which they use to support themselves on vertical trees.

- Eurasian treecreeper, Certhia familiaris
- Short-toed treecreeper, Certhia brachydactyla

== Wrens ==
Order: Passeriformes Family: Troglodytidae

The wrens are mainly small and inconspicuous except for their loud songs. These birds have short wings and thin down-turned bills. Several species often hold their tails upright. All are insectivorous.

- Eurasian wren, Troglodytes troglodytes

== Dippers ==
Order: Passeriformes Family: Cinclidae

Dippers are a group of perching birds whose habitat includes aquatic environments in the Americas, Europe and Asia. They are named for their bobbing or dipping movements.

- White-throated dipper, Cinclus cinclus

== Starlings ==
Order: Passeriformes Family: Sturnidae

Starlings are small to medium-sized passerine birds. Their flight is strong and direct and they are very gregarious. Their preferred habitat is fairly open country. They eat insects and fruit. Plumage is typically dark with a metallic sheen.

- European starling, Sturnus vulgaris
- Rosy starling, Pastor roseus (A)

== Thrushes and allies ==
Order: Passeriformes Family: Turdidae

The thrushes are a group of passerine birds that occur mainly in the Old World. They are plump, soft plumaged, small to medium-sized insectivores or sometimes omnivores, often feeding on the ground. Many have attractive songs.

- Mistle thrush, Turdus viscivorus
- Song thrush, Turdus philomelos
- Redwing, Turdus iliacus
- Eurasian blackbird, Turdus merula
- American robin, Turdus migratorius (A)
- Eyebrowed thrush, Turdus obscurus (A)
- Fieldfare, Turdus pilaris
- Ring ouzel, Turdus torquatus
- Black-throated thrush, Turdus atrogularis (A)
- Dusky thrush, Turdus eunomus (A)
- Naumann's thrush, Turdus naumanni (A)

== Old World flycatchers ==
Order: Passeriformes Family: Muscicapidae

Old World flycatchers are a large group of small passerine birds native to the Old World. They are mainly small arboreal insectivores. The appearance of these birds is highly varied, but they mostly have weak songs and harsh calls.

- Spotted flycatcher, Muscicapa striata
- European robin, Erithacus rubecula
- Thrush nightingale, Luscinia luscinia
- Common nightingale, Luscinia megarhynchos
- Bluethroat, Luscinia svecica
- Red-flanked bluetail, Tarsiger cyanurus (A)
- Red-breasted flycatcher, Ficedula parva
- Semicollared flycatcher, Ficedula semitorquata (A)
- European pied flycatcher, Ficedula hypoleuca
- Collared flycatcher, Ficedula albicollis
- Common redstart, Phoenicurus phoenicurus
- Black redstart, Phoenicurus ochruros
- Rufous-tailed rock-thrush, Monticola saxatilis
- Whinchat, Saxicola rubetra
- European stonechat, Saxicola rubicola
- Northern wheatear, Oenanthe oenanthe
- Desert wheatear, Oenanthe deserti (A)
- Western black-eared wheatear, Oenanthe hispanica (A)
- Eastern black-eared wheatear, Oenanthe melanoleuca (A)

== Waxwings ==
Order: Passeriformes Family: Bombycillidae

The waxwings are a group of birds with soft silky plumage and unique red tips to some of the wing feathers. In the Bohemian and cedar waxwings, these tips look like sealing wax and give the group its name. These are arboreal birds of northern forests. They live on insects in summer and berries in winter.

- Bohemian waxwing, Bombycilla garrulus

== Accentors ==
Order: Passeriformes Family: Prunellidae

The accentors are in the only bird family, Prunellidae, which is completely endemic to the Palearctic. They are small, fairly drab species superficially similar to sparrows.

- Alpine accentor, Prunella collaris
- Siberian accentor, Prunella montanella (A)
- Dunnock, Prunella modularis

== Old World sparrows ==
Order: Passeriformes Family: Passeridae

Old World sparrows are small passerine birds. In general, sparrows tend to be small, plump, brown or grey birds with short tails and short powerful beaks. Sparrows are seed eaters, but they also consume small insects.

- House sparrow, Passer domesticus
- Eurasian tree sparrow, Passer montanus
- White-winged snowfinch, Montifringilla nivalis (A)

== Wagtails and pipits ==
Order: Passeriformes Family: Motacillidae

Motacillidae is a family of small passerine birds with medium to long tails. They include the wagtails, longclaws and pipits. They are slender, ground feeding insectivores of open country.

- Gray wagtail, Motacilla cinerea
- Western yellow wagtail, Motacilla flava
- Citrine wagtail, Motacilla citreola (A)
- White wagtail, Motacilla alba
- Richard's pipit, Anthus richardi (A)
- Tawny pipit, Anthus campestris
- Meadow pipit, Anthus pratensis
- Tree pipit, Anthus trivialis
- Red-throated pipit, Anthus cervinus
- Water pipit, Anthus spinoletta
- Rock pipit, Anthus petrosus (A)

== Finches, euphonias, and allies ==
Order: Passeriformes Family: Fringillidae

Finches are seed-eating passerine birds, that are small to moderately large and have a strong beak, usually conical and in some species very large. All have twelve tail feathers and nine primaries. These birds have a bouncing flight with alternating bouts of flapping and gliding on closed wings, and most sing well.

- Common chaffinch, Fringilla coelebs
- Brambling, Fringilla montifringilla
- Hawfinch, Coccothraustes coccothraustes
- Common rosefinch, Carpodacus erythrinus
- Pine grosbeak, Pinicola enucleator (A)
- Eurasian bullfinch, Pyrrhula pyrrhula
- Trumpeter finch, Bucanetes githagineus (A)
- European greenfinch, Chloris chloris
- Twite, Linaria flavirostris
- Eurasian linnet, Linaria cannabina
- Common redpoll, Acanthis flammea
- Lesser redpoll, Acanthis cabaret
- Hoary redpoll, Acanthis hornemanni (A)
- Parrot crossbill, Loxia pytyopsittacus (A)
- Red crossbill, Loxia curvirostra
- White-winged crossbill, Loxia leucoptera (A)
- European goldfinch, Carduelis carduelis
- Citril finch, Carduelis citrinella (A)
- European serin, Serinus serinus
- Eurasian siskin, Spinus spinus

== Longspurs and snow buntings ==
Order: Passeriformes Family: Calcariidae

The Calcariidae are a family of birds that had been traditionally grouped with the New World sparrows, but differ in a number of respects and are usually found in open grassy areas.

- Lapland longspur - Calcarius lapponicus (A)
- Snow bunting - Plectrophenax nivalis

== Old World buntings ==
Order: Passeriformes Family: Emberizidae

The emberizids are a large family of passerine birds. They are seed-eating birds with distinctively shaped bills. Many emberizid species have distinctive head patterns.

- Black-headed bunting, Emberiza melanocephala (A)
- Red-headed bunting, Emberiza bruniceps (A)
- Corn bunting, Emberiza calandra
- Rock bunting, Emberiza cia (A)
- Cirl bunting, Emberiza cirlus (A)
- Yellowhammer, Emberiza citrinella
- Pine bunting, Emberiza leucocephalos (A)
- Ortolan bunting, Emberiza hortulana
- Reed bunting, Emberiza schoeniclus
- Yellow-breasted bunting, Emberiza aureola (A)
- Little bunting, Emberiza pusilla (A)
- Rustic bunting, Emberiza rustica (A)

== See also ==
- List of birds
- Lists of birds by region
- Fauna of the Czech Republic
