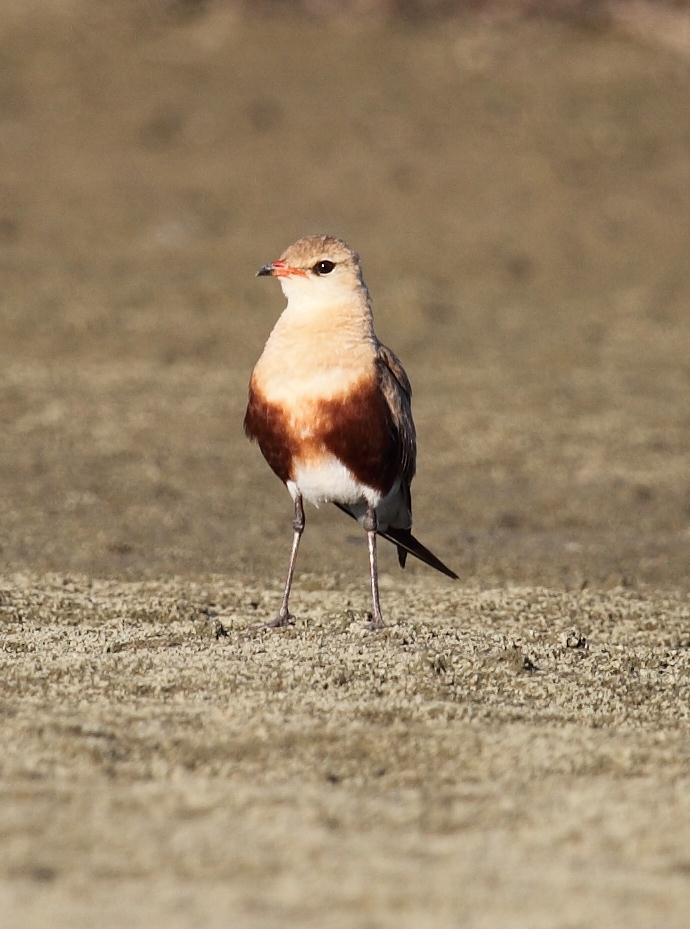

Conservation status
- Least Concern (IUCN 3.1)

Scientific classification
- Kingdom: Animalia
- Phylum: Chordata
- Class: Aves
- Order: Charadriiformes
- Family: Glareolidae
- Genus: Glareola
- Species: G. isabella

Binomial name
- Glareola isabella Vieillot, 1816

Synonyms
- Stiltia isabella

= Australian pratincole =

Species of bird

The Australian pratincole (Glareola isabella) is a species of bird in the family Glareolidae. It breeds in Australia's interior and winters in northern and eastern parts of the continent, Indonesia and New Guinea. It is a medium-sized nomadic shorebird but is commonly found in arid inland Australia. It breeds predominantly from south-western Queensland to northern Victoria, and through central Australia to the Kimberley region in Western Australia. The Australian population is estimated at 60,000 individuals.

They are a migratory species that generally move to the southern parts of their distribution range to breed during spring and summer. During winter they migrate to northern Australia, New Guinea, Java, Sulawesi and southern Borneo. Although they are common, their occurrence is unpredictable and varies in location.

== Taxonomy ==
The Australian pratincole was formerly placed in the monotypic genus Stiltia. It was moved to the genus Glareola based on a 2022 molecular genetic study of the Charadriiformes by David Černý and Rossy Natale that showed that the species was embedded within the genus Glareola.

=== Other common names ===
The pratincole is also known as the Arnhem Land grouse, Australian courser, roadrunner (not to be confused with the genus of North American cuckoos, Geococcyx), nankeen plover and swallow-plover.

== Description ==
The Australian pratincole is a medium-sized slender shorebird with long legs, long pointed wings and a short decurved bill. It is 19–24 cm (7.5–9.4 in) long, has a wingspan of 50–60 cm (20–24 in) and weighs 55–75 g (1.9–2.6 oz).

The sexes look alike but their breeding and non-breeding plumage differs.

In their breeding plumage, the head, neck, breast and upperparts are a sandy brown grading. The wings are pointed and black and there is a black loral strip. The chin and throat are white and the breast is a sandy brown. The bill is bright red with a black base and the iris is dark brown. Their legs and feet are grey to black.

Their non-breeding plumage is not well known, because there are seasonal and individual variations. The loral stripe is fainter than when in breeding plumage, and the base of the bill is paler. The upper parts are grey-brown with sandy-buff fringes. Sometimes there are dark flecks at the borders of the pale throat.

Juvenile plumage is similar to a non-breeding adult but a slightly paler sandy brown colour. The lores lack the black colour and the forehead, crown and nape are streaked dark brown. The bill is grey-black with a faint reddish base.

In flight, the upper body and inner wing are sandy brown with black on the outer wing. The tail is square-cut, and the upper-tail coverts and sides of the tail are white.

The Australian pratincole is slightly slimmer and smaller in size than oriental pratincole (Glareola maldivarum), with longer legs. Juveniles with worn plumage and birds in non-breeding plumage can also be confused with the oriental pratincole.

== Habitat and distribution ==
The habitat of the Australian pratincole is treeless, open and sparsely wooded plains, grasslands, claypans and gibberstone. Most of those areas are in arid and semi-arid rainfall zones. The birds can also be found around the margins of wetlands, creeks, river beds, bore drains, lagoons, springs, claypans and sewage farms. During the breeding season, they inhabit low, scattered shrubland, because the chicks use the vegetation to hide and shelter in.

== Behaviour and ecology ==
=== Diet ===
The diet of the Australian pratincole consists mainly of insects, spiders and centipedes. Insects are caught either hawking in the air or pecked from the surface of the ground. When foraging on the ground, the birds stalk their prey, then dart forward to catch the prey, sometimes with one wing outspread. They actively forage during the day, with peak periods at dawn and dusk. They require drinking water because they thermoregulate by evaporation from the mouth. They have salt glands, so both saline and ephemeral water can be drunk.

=== Breeding ===
They are a monogamous species, with pairs staying together during the breeding season. They usually lay two eggs in a scrape on bare ground. Sometimes, in a dry season, only one egg is laid. If the ground is soft, the birds will make a shallow depression. The nests are sometimes ringed with small stones or sheep droppings. They are sometimes lined with small pebbles, dry plant material or rabbit droppings. The eggs are light cream to stony brown in colour, with short wavy streaks and irregularly shaped spots of brownish black, intermingled with smaller underlying bluish-grey markings which are evenly distributed. The egg measure approximately 31mm x 24mm.

Both sexes have been observed to incubate the eggs and care for the chicks. The young are semi-precocial and downy, with sandy buff with black markings. At approximately 10 days, feathers start to appear and, at three weeks of age they are fully feathered, with similar colouration to that of a non-breeding adult. The parents continue to feed the young until they are able to fly at four or five weeks.

=== Migration ===
They are known to gather in flocks to migrate, and calls heard continuously within the flock.

=== Sexual behaviour/courtship ===
When the birds first arrive in the breeding grounds they appear to already be paired. At that time, the birds appear to be maintaining their bonds and possibly enter into courtship rituals. It appears that the nest site selection is part of the pair-bond ritual, with both sexes involved equally. They have been observed running to a spot where one sits down and shuffles its belly and throws small objects sideways. The mate watches, then selects another spot and repeats the ritual.

=== Family group relations ===
After hatching, the chicks are led by the parents to nearby cover or refuge. However, some chicks stay in the nest for one day. The parents feed the chicks, flying from up to 1 km (0.62 mi) away with food in their bill. The chicks run out to be fed, probably in response to calls by the parents.

=== Distraction displays ===
The Australian pratincole has a repertoire of displays to distract threats, including:

- False-brooding
- Low flight skimming tops of shrubs
- Wings held vertically upwards
- Injury-feigning display away from intruder, showing black and white tail pattern
- Injury-feigning display towards intruder
- Darting about or jumping 20 cm in the air ritualising feeding patterns with or without both wings partly spread.
- Non-vocal sounds- during intense distraction displays, the wings are beaten loudly on the ground accompanied by an intense alarm call.

=== Voice ===
The Australian pratincole is known to call during summer thunderstorms. The calls are sweet or plaintive whistles, or very soft and muted trills and loud sharp notes. No difference in calls between males and females has been identified.

Four different types of calls have been clearly identified:

- Flight call — sweet whistling upslurred weeteet or quirriepeet. Calls are usually a series of three or four rapidly repeated notes, varying in length, with the tone rising then falling rapidly.
- Far-contact call — plaintive down-slurred tuwhee. The call is used between mates from the ground near the nest and also used to call chicks.
- Greeting call — gently trilled pree or short phrase pree-pree-pippip-pip which is used during courtship display and when flying to mate.
- Alarm call — loud sharp notes in increasing intensity WIT-itit, Weetle-itit and wee-WIT-ititit, accompanied at times by distraction displays.
