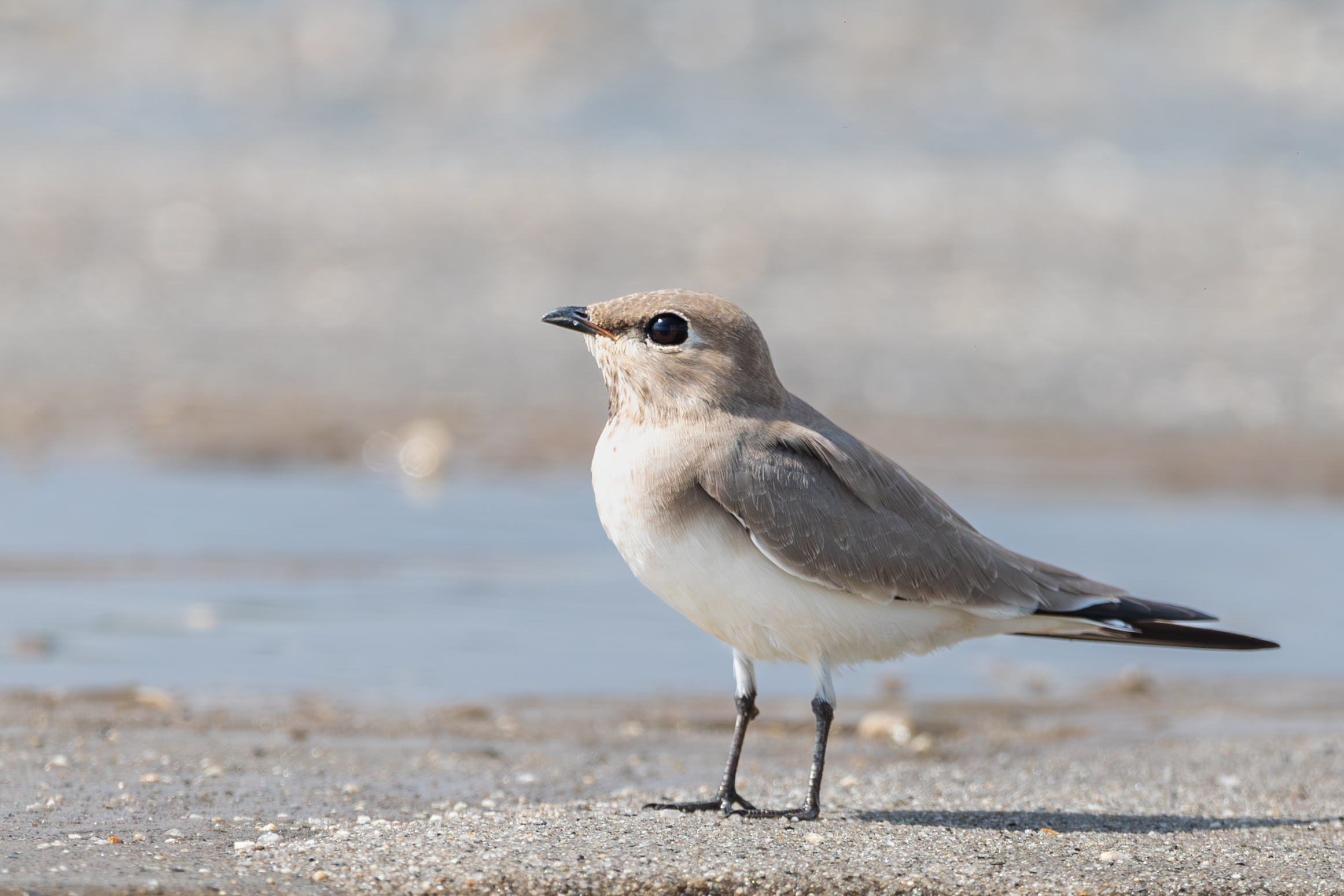
- in Nepal

Conservation status
- Least Concern (IUCN 3.1)

Scientific classification
- Kingdom: Animalia
- Phylum: Chordata
- Class: Aves
- Order: Charadriiformes
- Family: Glareolidae
- Genus: Glareola
- Species: G. lactea

Binomial name
- Glareola lactea Temminck, 1820

= Small pratincole =

Species of bird

The small pratincole, little pratincole, or small Indian pratincole (Glareola lactea) is a small wader in the pratincole family, Glareolidae.

== Distribution ==
The small pratincole is a resident breeder in India, Western Pakistan, Bangladesh, Burma, Laos, Cambodia, Sri Lanka and Thailand. It breeds from December to March on gravel or sand banks near rivers and lakes, laying 2–4 eggs in a ground scrape. Breeding areas include small areas in northern Karnataka (manvi district raichur and along the Hemavathi River) and northern Kerala near Kannur.

This species is only 16.5–18.5 cm (6.5–7.3 in) in length, with a 42–48 cm (17–19 in) wingspan. Because of its small size, the small pratincole can be briefly confused in flight with swifts or swallows.

== Description ==
This bird has short legs, long pointed wings and a short tail. Its short bill is an adaptation to aerial feeding. On the ground, it looks mainly pale grey (hence lactea, milky). The crown of the head is brown.

The wings are grey above with black primaries and black and white bars at the rear edge of the inner flight feathers. The underwings are mainly black. The tail is white with a black terminal triangle. The belly is white.

== Ecology ==
The most unusual feature of the pratincoles is that although classed as waders they typically hunt their insect prey on the wing like swallows, although they can also feed on the ground.

The small pratincole is a species of open country, and is often seen near water in the evening, hawking for insects.

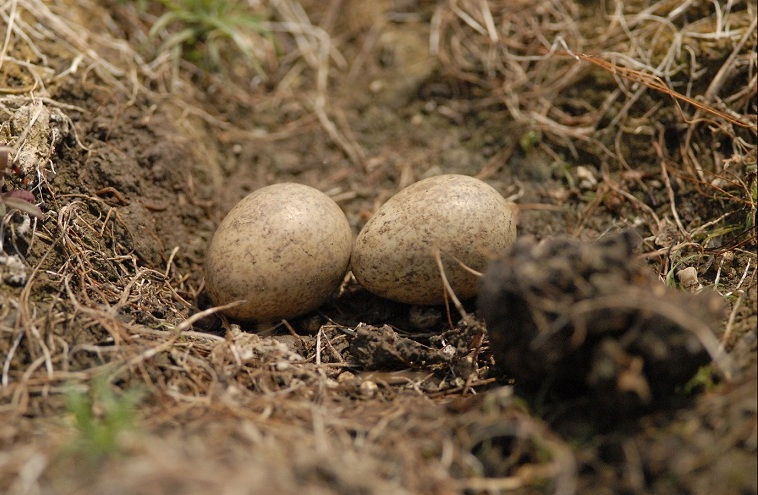
Small pratincole - nest

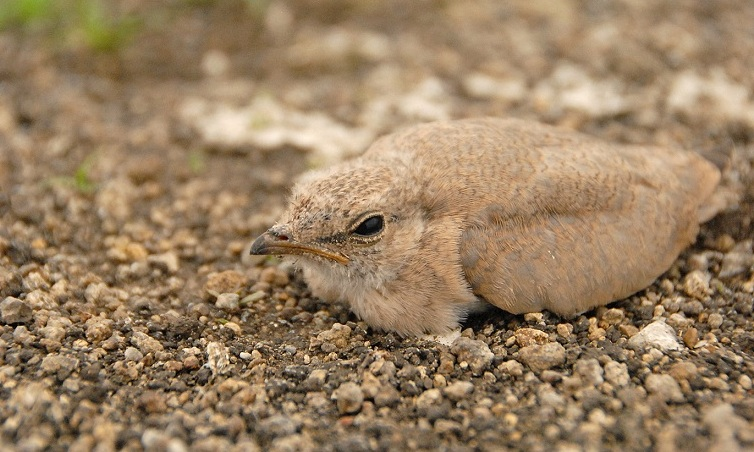
Small pratincole - chick

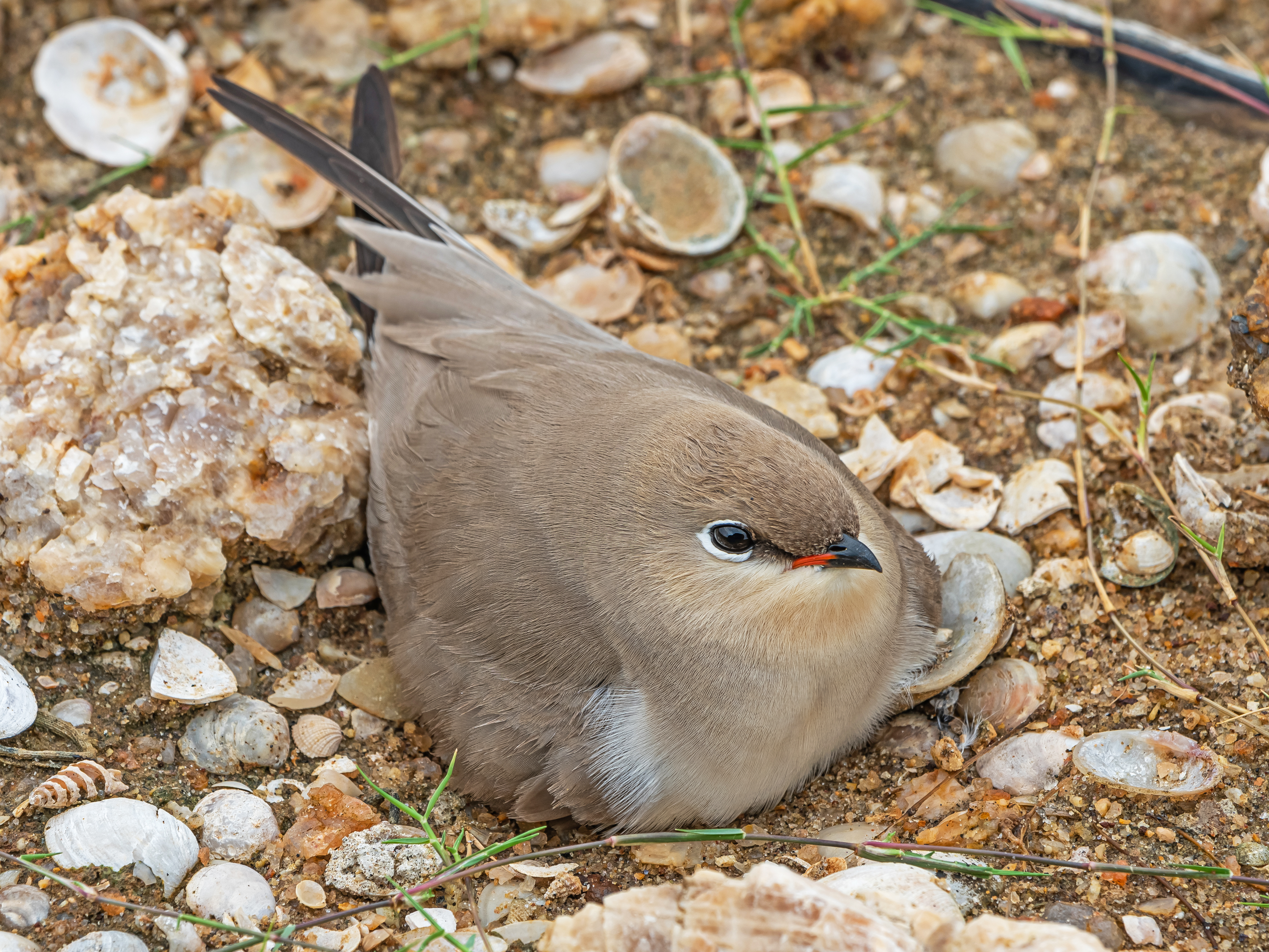
In Bundala National Park, Sri Lanka

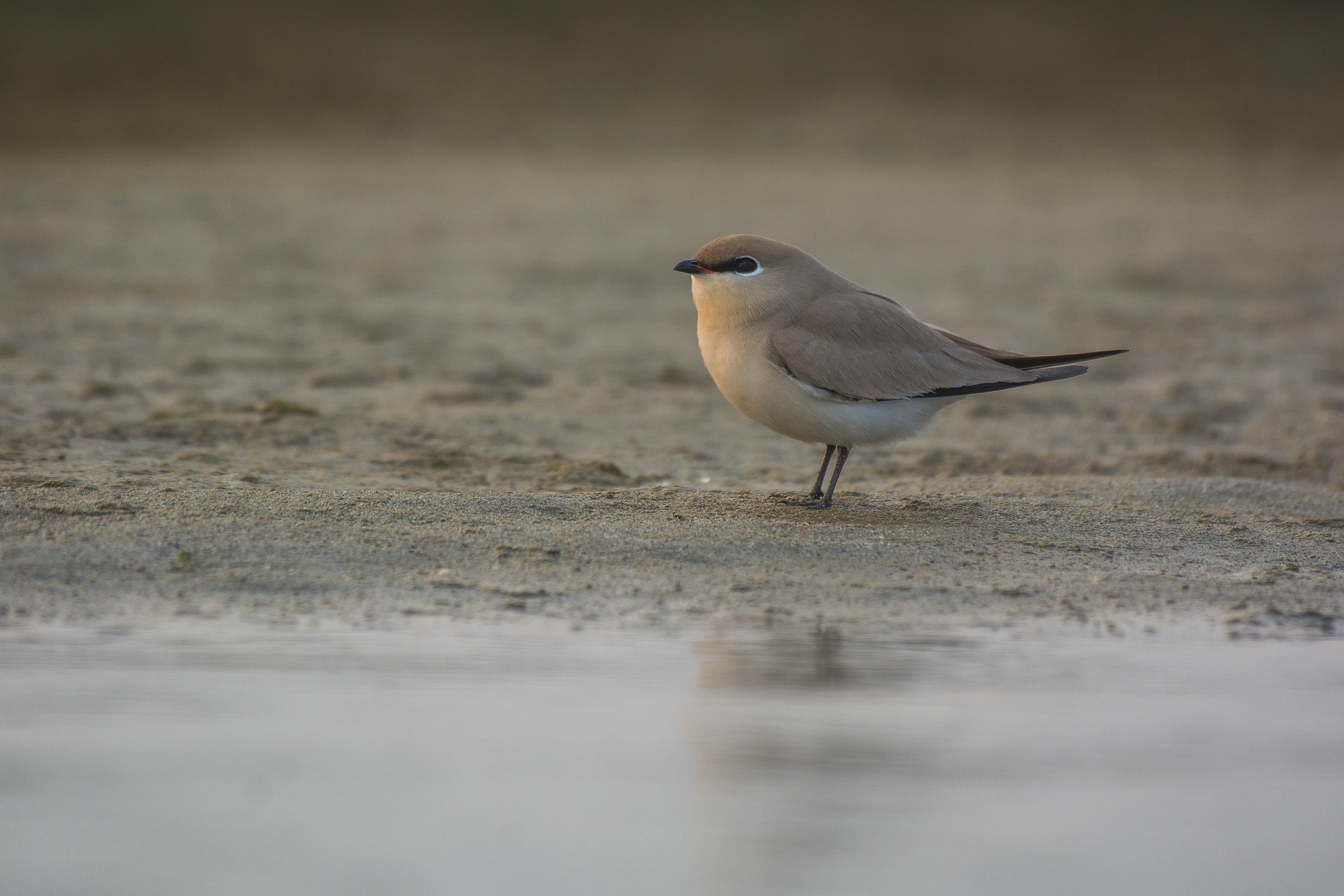
In Gajoldoba Wetlands

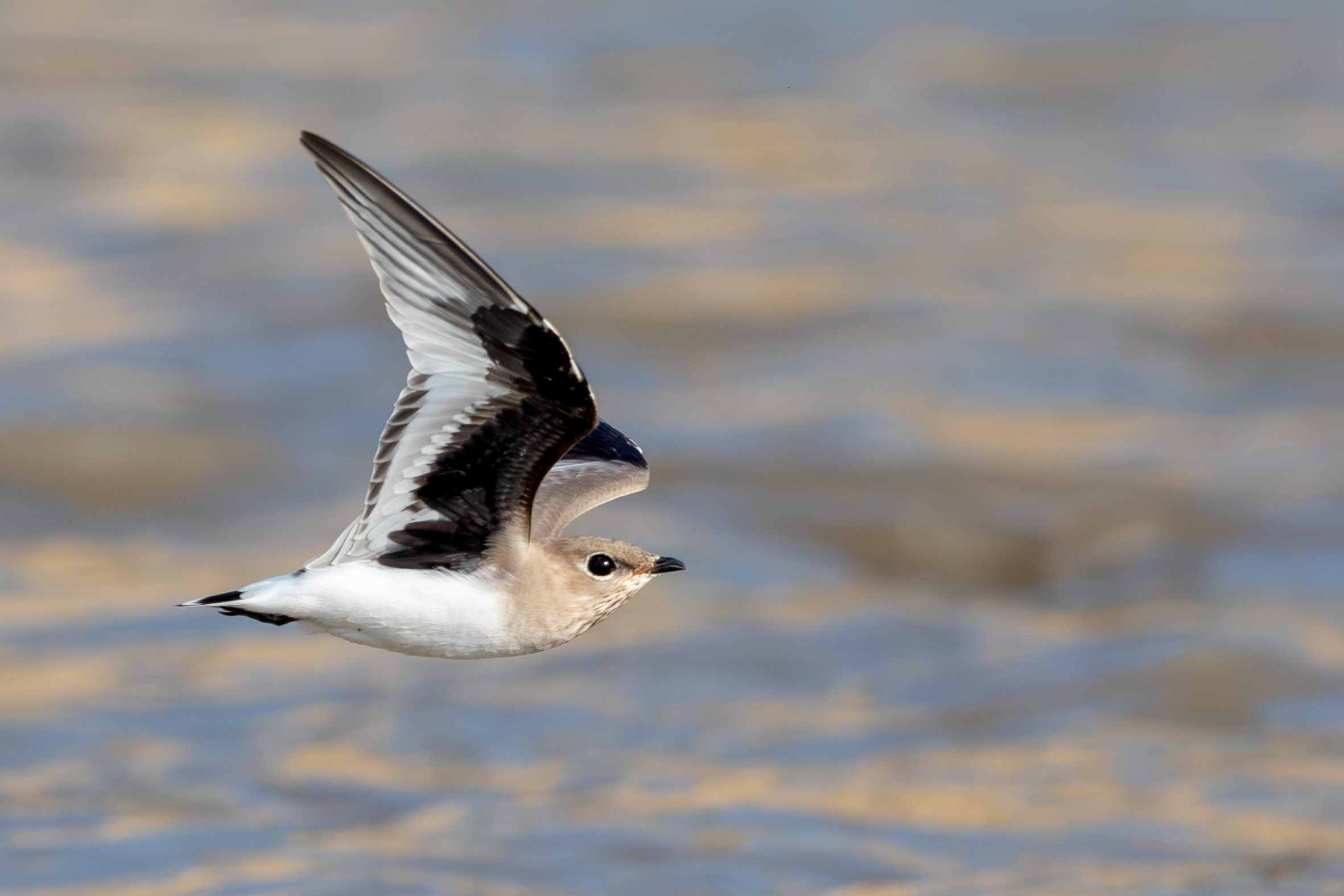
in flight, Nepal
