= Wilhelm Heinrich Kramer =

Saxonian-Austrian physician and naturalist (died 1765)

Wilhelm Heinrich Kramer (1724 in Dresden – 13 October 1765) was a German physician and naturalist.

Kramer studied in Vienna, Austria, then practiced medicine in Bruck, close to the capital, for at least 14 years. He published in 1756 a work entitled Elenchus Vegetabilium and Animalium per Austriam inferiorem Observatorum, a flora and fauna of Lower Austria noted especially because it was one of the first works to adopt the binomial nomenclature of Carl von Linné (1707–1778). In it, he created the name pratincola for the collared pratincole which was adapted in English in the following work of Thomas Pennant (1726–1798) in 1773. It is probably for him that Giovanni Antonio Scopoli (1723–1788) dedicated Psittacus krameri (today Psittacula krameri) in 1769. He was also an entomologist.

== Sources ==
- Pierre Cabard et Bernard Chauvet (2003). L’Étymologie des noms d’oiseaux, Belin (Paris), collection Éveil nature : 590 p. ISBN 2-7011-3783-7
