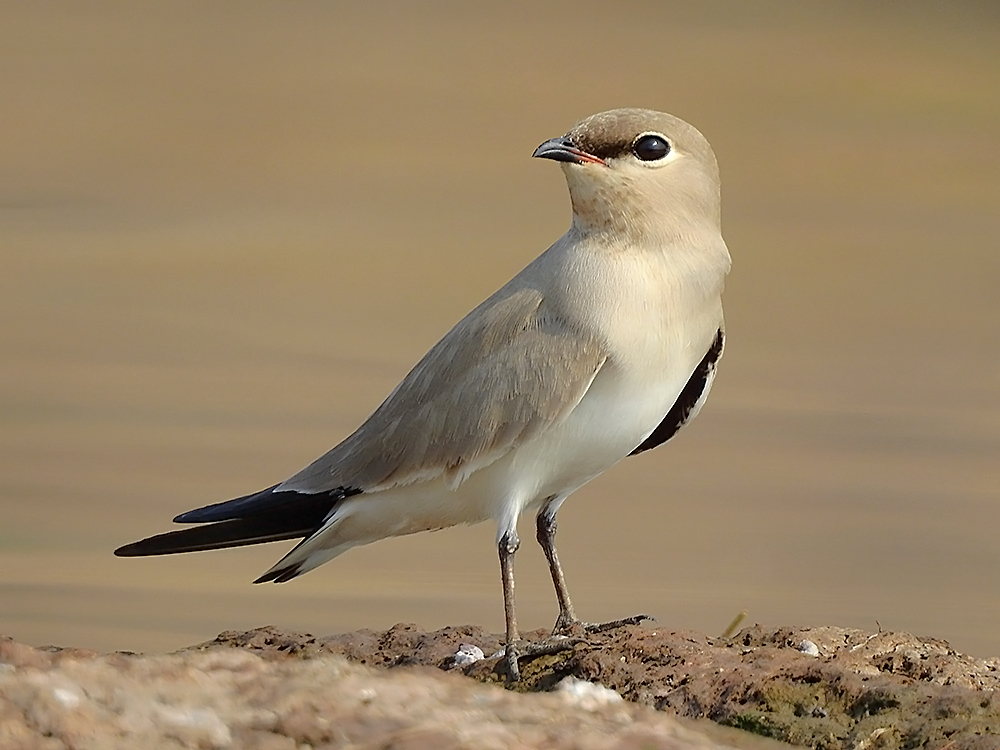
- Small pratincole (Glareola lactea) from Mangaon, Maharashtra, India

Scientific classification
- Kingdom: Animalia
- Phylum: Chordata
- Class: Aves
- Order: Charadriiformes
- Family: Glareolidae
- Subfamily: Glareolinae
- Genus: Glareola; Brisson, 1760

Type species
- Hirundo pratincola Linnaeus, 1766

Species
- see text

= Pratincole =

Pratincoles

Subfamily of birds

The pratincoles are a genus of birds, Glareola, that comprise the subfamily Glareolinae, which together with the coursers make up the family Glareolidae. They have short legs, very long pointed wings, and in several, long forked tails.

== Taxonomy ==
The genus Glareola was introduced by the French zoologist Mathurin Jacques Brisson in 1760 with the collared pratincole (Glareola pratincola) as the type species. The genus name is a diminutive of Latin glarea, "gravel", referring to a typical nesting habitat.

Although traditionally thought to be waders, particularly closely related to plovers, genetic studies now classify the coursers and pratincoles in the suborder Lari, more closely related to gulls and terns, and closest of all to the crab-plover.

The Australian pratincole was formerly placed a separate genus Stiltia. It is longer-legged and more terrestrial than the other pratincoles, but is now included in the genus Glareola, as its exclusion leaves Glareola paraphyletic with G. nuchalis being basal in the group.

The name "pratincole" comes from the term pratincola coined by German naturalist Wilhelm Heinrich Kramer from the Latin words prātum meadow and incola resident.

== Description ==
Their most unusual feature is that they typically hunt their insect prey on the wing like swallows, although they will also feed on the ground, running to pick up insects. Their short bills are an adaptation to aerial feeding.

Their flight is fast and graceful like a swallow or a tern, with many twists and turns to pursue their prey. They are most active at dawn and dusk, resting in the warmest part of the day.

Like the coursers, the pratincoles are found in warmer parts of the Old World, from southern Europe and Africa east through Asia to Australia. Species breeding in warm temperate regions are long-distance migrants.

Their two to four eggs are laid on the ground in a bare scrape.

The downy pratincole chicks are able to run as soon as they are hatched.

== Species list ==
- Genus Glareola
  - Australian pratincole Stiltia isabella or Glareola isabella (formerly placed in the monotypic genus Stiltia, now part of Glareola)
  - Rock pratincole Glareola nuchalis
  - Grey pratincole Glareola cinerea
  - Small pratincole Glareola lactea
  - Oriental pratincole Glareola maldivarum
  - Black-winged pratincole Glareola nordmanni
  - Collared pratincole Glareola pratincola
  - Madagascar pratincole Glareola ocularis
