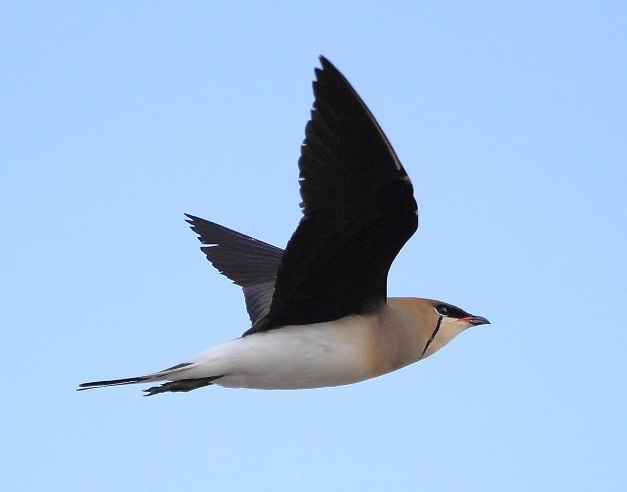

Conservation status
- Near Threatened (IUCN 3.1)

Scientific classification
- Kingdom: Animalia
- Phylum: Chordata
- Class: Aves
- Order: Charadriiformes
- Family: Glareolidae
- Genus: Glareola
- Species: G. nordmanni

Binomial name
- Glareola nordmanni Fischer von Waldheim, 1842
- Range of species, with breeding (orange), non-breeding (blue), and migration (yellow) ranges.

= Black-winged pratincole =

Species of bird

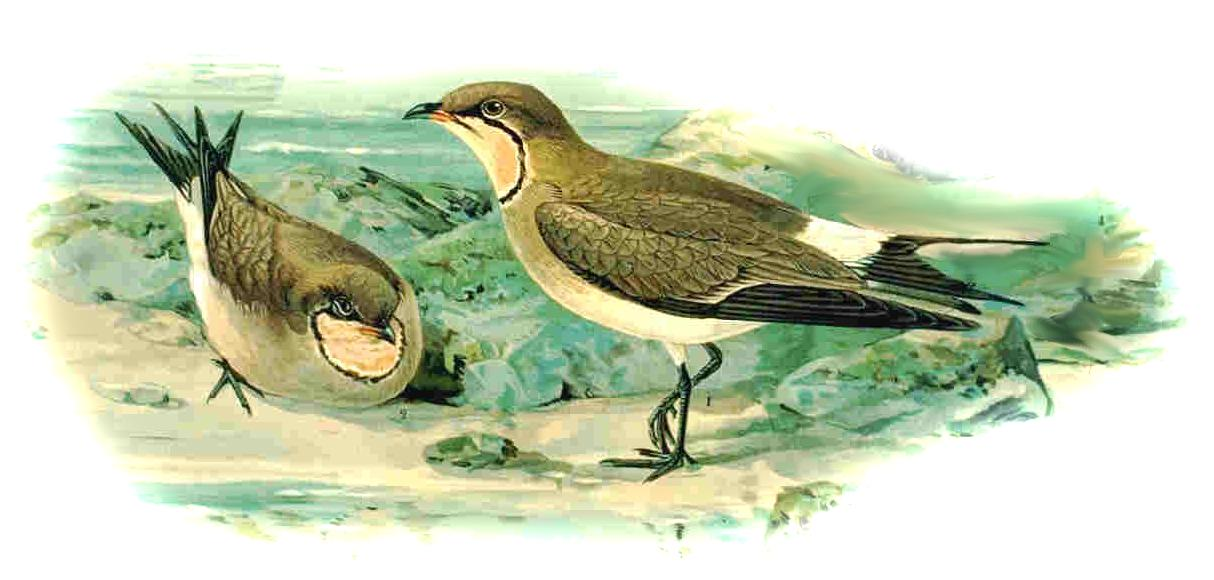
Illustration by Johann Friedrich Naumann

The black-winged pratincole (Glareola nordmanni) is a wader in the pratincole bird family, Glareolidae. The genus name is a diminutive of Latin glarea, "gravel", referring to a typical nesting habitat for pratincoles. The species name commemorates the Finnish-born zoologist and explorer Alexander von Nordmann.

== Description ==
It is 24–28 cm (9.4–11.0 in) long, with short legs, long pointed wings and a forked tail. It has a short bill, which is an adaptation to aerial feeding. The back and head are brown, and the wings are brown with black flight feathers. The belly is white and the underwings are black. Very good views are needed to distinguish this species from other pratincoles, such as the collared pratincole and the oriental pratincole which may occur in its range. It is marginally larger than the collared pratincole, and is shorter-tailed and longer legged. Although the dark underwing and lack of a white trailing edge to the wing are diagnostic, these features are not always readily seen in the field, especially as the chestnut underwing of the collared pratincole appears black unless excellent views are obtained.

== Distribution and habitat ==
The black-winged pratincole is a bird of open country and is often seen near water in the evening, hawking for insects. This pratincole is found in warmer parts of south-east Europe and south-west Asia. It is migratory, wintering in tropical Africa, and is rare north or west of the breeding range.

== Behaviour ==
=== Breeding ===
Its 2–4 eggs are laid on the ground.

=== Feeding ===
An unusual feature of the pratincoles is that, although classed as waders, they typically hunt their insect prey on the wing like swallows, although they can also feed on the ground.

== Conservation ==
The black-winged pratincole is one of the species to which the Agreement on the Conservation of African-Eurasian Migratory Waterbirds (AEWA) applies.

The Acanthocephalan parasite Apororhynchus paulonucleatus was discovered in the intestine of the black-winged pratincole.

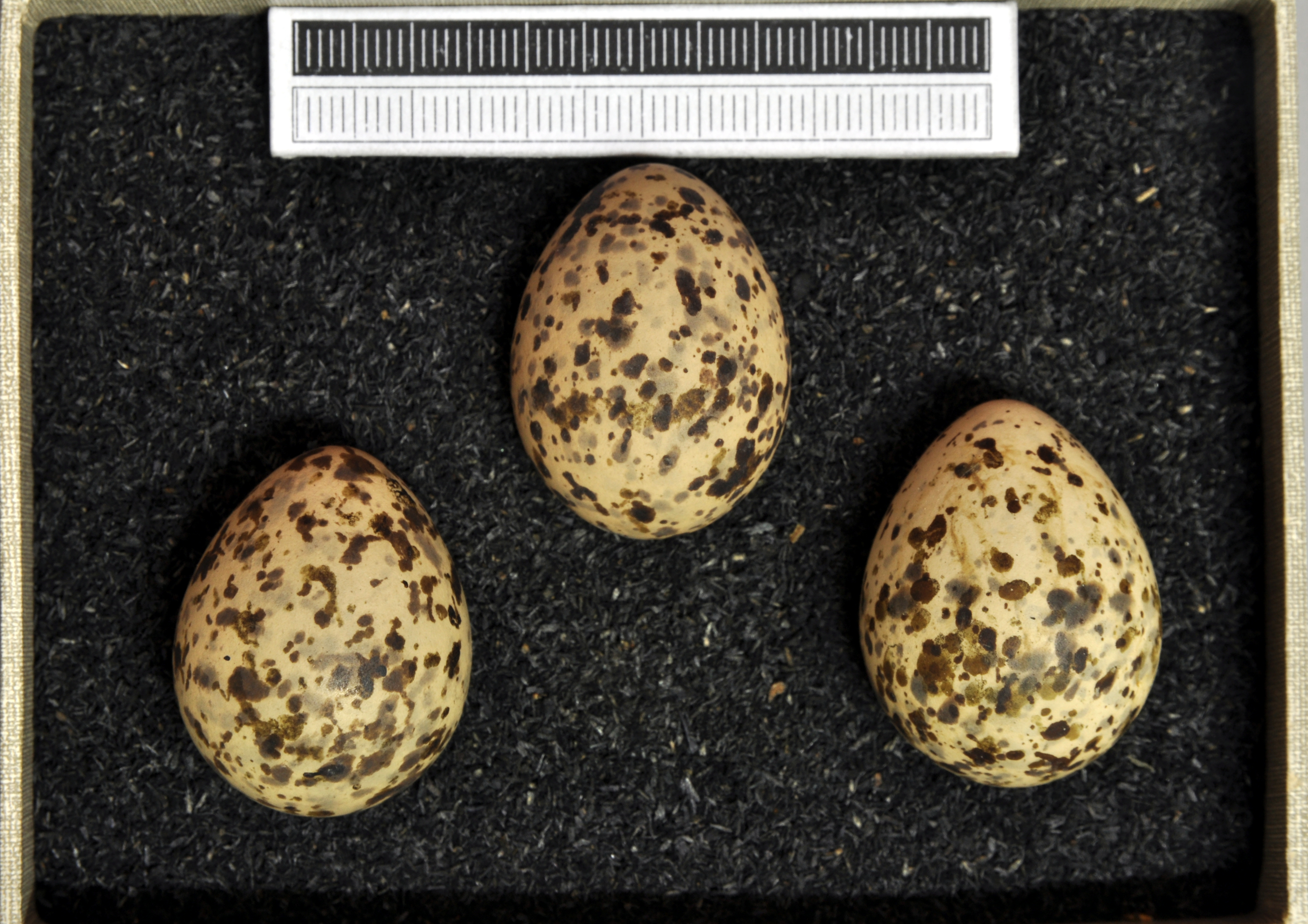
Eggs, Collection Museum Wiesbaden, Germany
