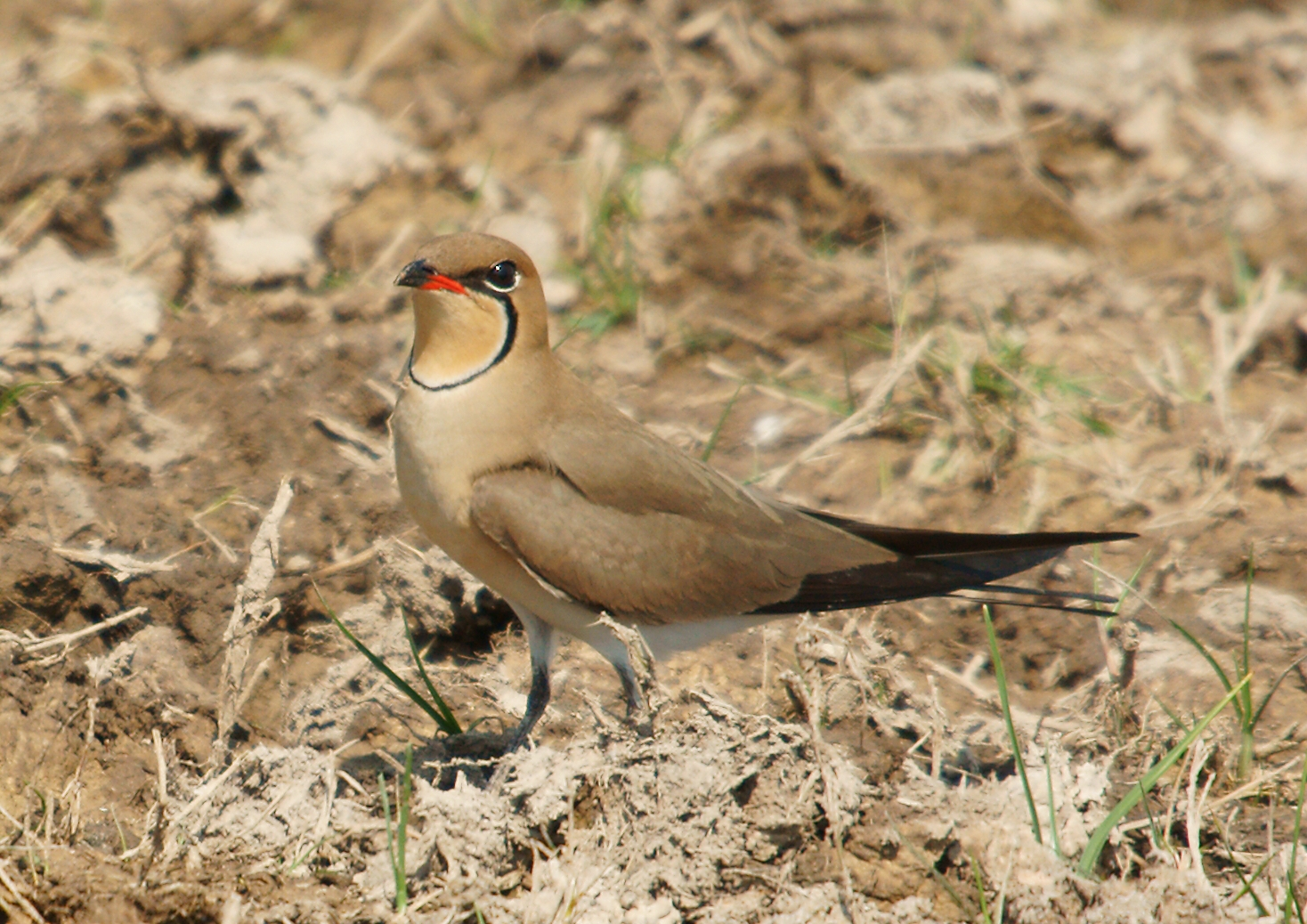
- Adult
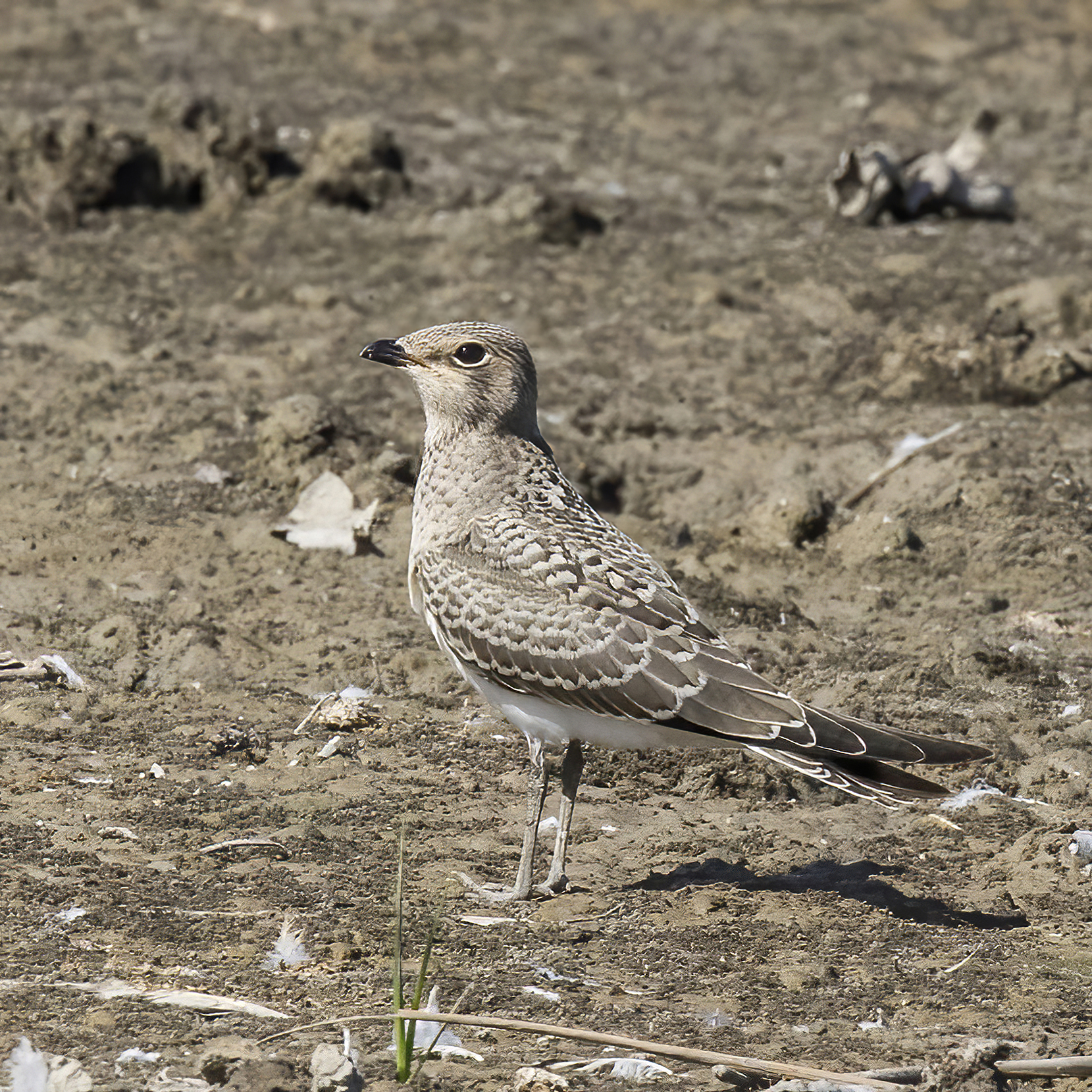
- Juvenile

Conservation status
- Least Concern (IUCN 3.1)

Scientific classification
- Kingdom: Animalia
- Phylum: Chordata
- Class: Aves
- Order: Charadriiformes
- Family: Glareolidae
- Genus: Glareola
- Species: G. pratincola

Binomial name
- Glareola pratincola (Linnaeus, 1766)
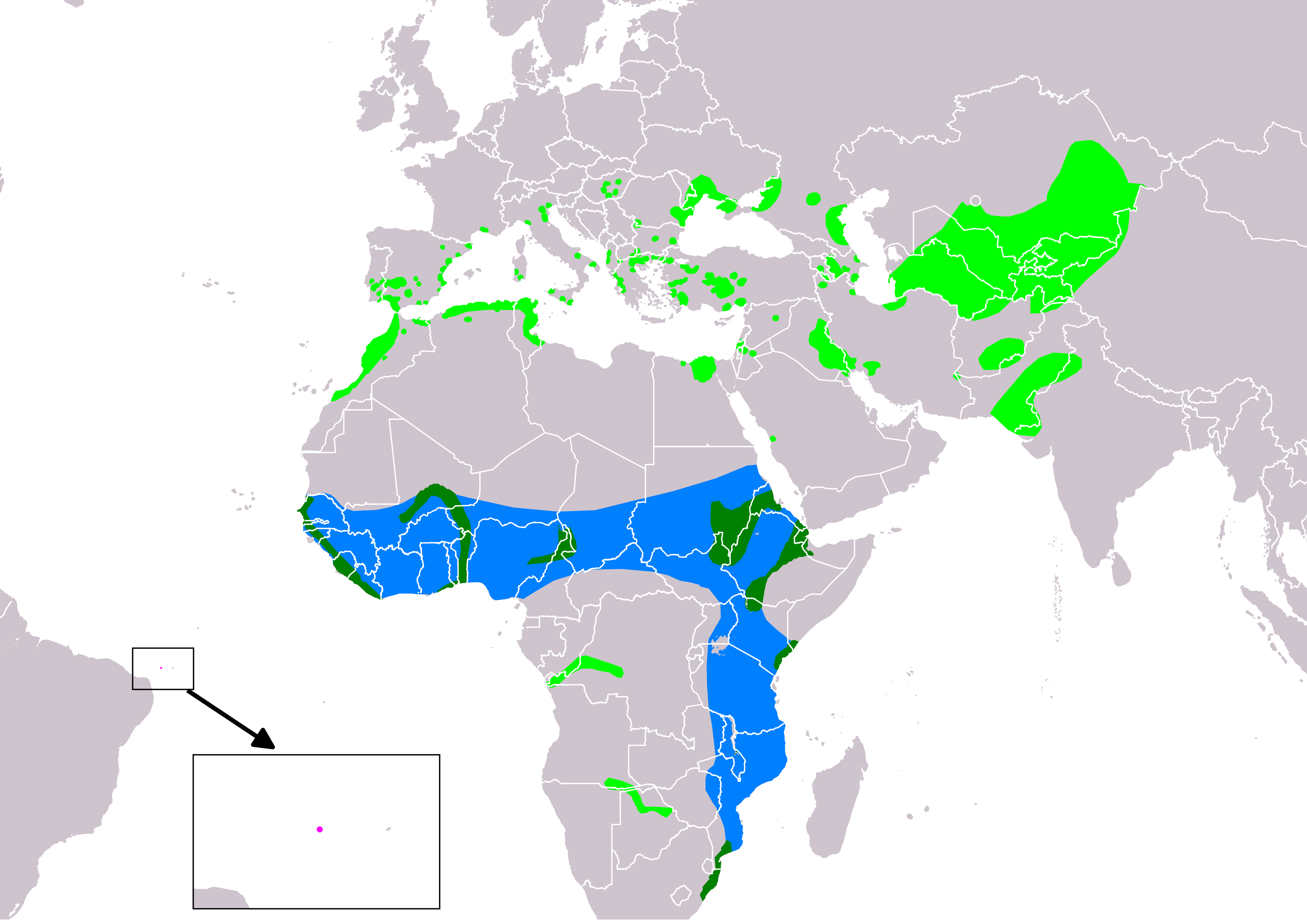
- Range of G. pratincola Breeding Resident Non-breeding Vagrant (seasonality uncertain)

Synonyms
- Hirundo pratincola Linnaeus, 1766

= Collared pratincole =

Species of bird

The collared pratincole (Glareola pratincola), also known as the common pratincole or red-winged pratincole, is a wader in the pratincole family, Glareolidae. As with other pratincoles, it is native to the Old World.

== Taxonomy ==
The collared pratincole was formally described by the Swedish naturalist Carl Linnaeus in 1766 in the twelfth edition of his Systema Naturae. He placed it with the swallows and swifts in the genus Hirundo and coined the binomial name Hirundo pratincola. The collared pratincole is now placed in the genus Glareola that was introduced by the French zoologist Mathurin Jacques Brisson in 1760. The genus name is a diminutive of Latin glarea, "gravel", referring to a typical nesting habitat for pratincoles. The species name pratincola means an inhabitant of meadows, from Latin pratum, prati, "meadow" and incola, "inhabitant", from incolere, "to inhabit".

Two subspecies are recognised:

- Glareola pratincola pratincola, (Linnaeus, 1766) – southern Europe & North Africa to south Pakistan
- Glareola pratincola fuelleborni, Neumann, 1910 – sub-Saharan Africa from Senegal to central Ethiopia and south Somalia south to east South Africa (includes erlangeri and riparia)
adult G. p. fuelleborni

juvenile G. p. fuelleborni

== Description ==
This pratincole is 24–28 cm (9.4–11.0 in) long with a 60–70 cm (24–28 in) wingspan. It has short legs, long pointed wings, a long forked tail, and a short bill, which is an adaptation to aerial feeding. The back and head are brown, and the wings are brown with darker flight feathers. The belly is white. The underwings are chestnut, but look dark below.

Very good views are needed to distinguish this species from other pratincoles, such as the black-winged pratincole and the oriental pratincole, which may occur in its range. The latter species also has a chestnut underwing, but is shorter-tailed.

== Distribution and habitat ==
The collared pratincole is a bird of open country, and is often seen near water in the evening, hawking for insects. It is found in the warmer parts of Europe, southwest Asia and Africa. It is migratory, wintering in tropical Africa, and is rare north of the breeding range. It has been recorded as a vagrant in Austria, Barbados, Belgium, Brazil, Cape Verde, China, the Czech Republic, Denmark, Djibouti, Finland, Germany, Gibraltar, Ireland, Latvia, Mauritius, the Netherlands, Norway, Poland, Seychelles, Slovakia, Slovenia, Sweden, Switzerland and the United Kingdom.

== Behaviour ==
=== Feeding ===
Pratincoles are unusual among waders in that they typically hunt their insect prey on the wing like swallows, although they can also feed on the ground.

=== Breeding ===
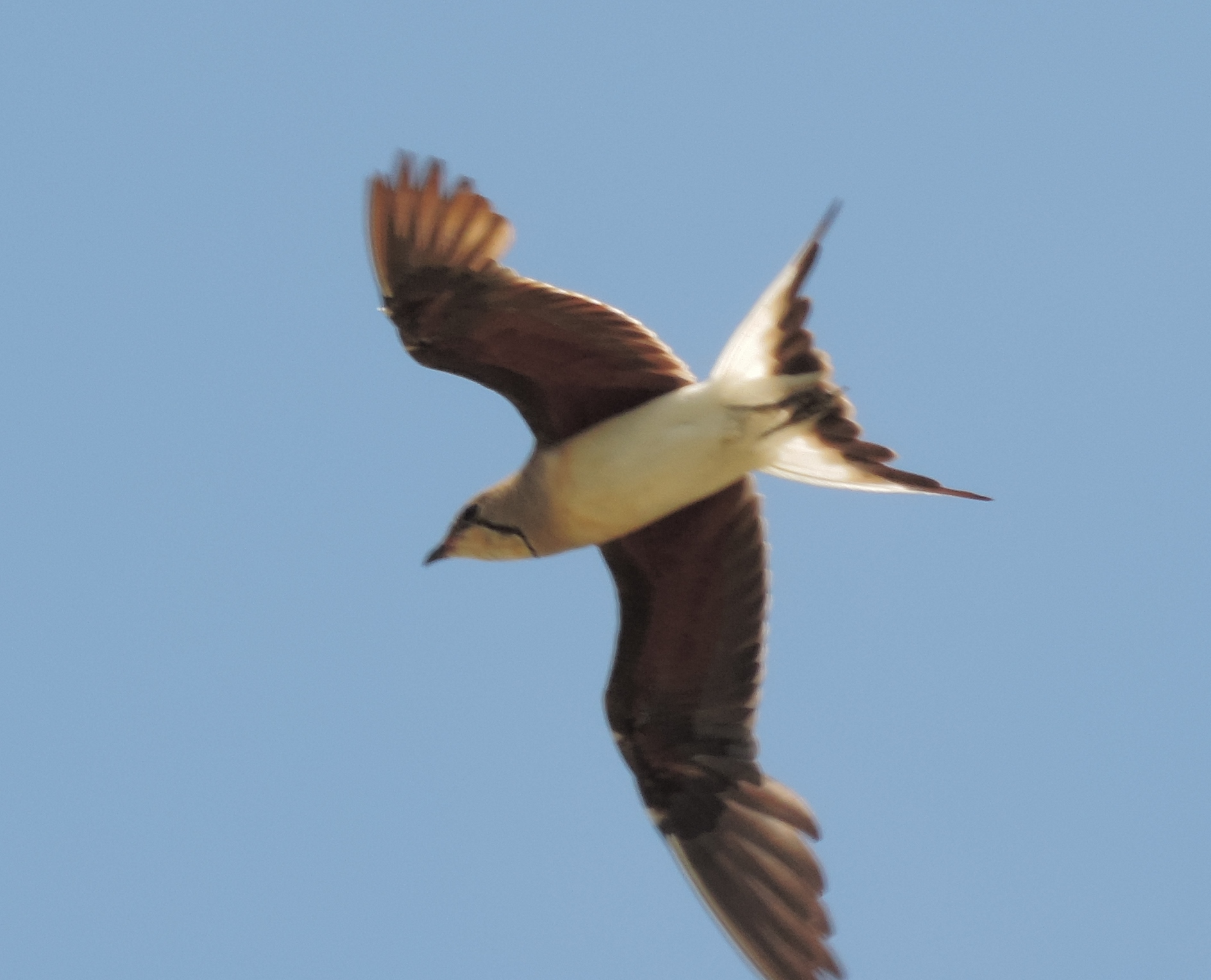
In flight, showing dark rufous underwing coverts and deeply forked tail

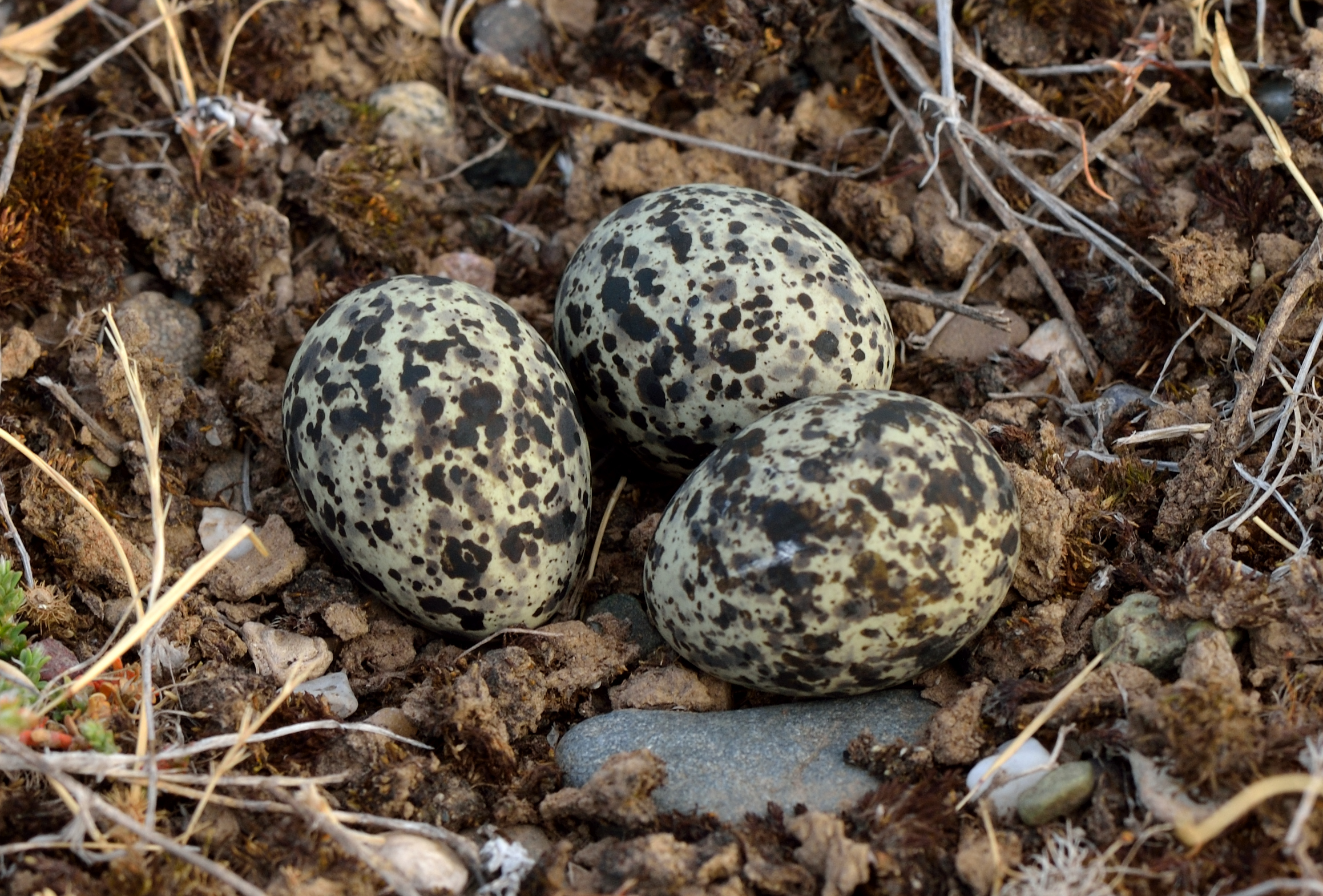
Clutch in nest

In Turkey

The nesting is colonial. The nest is a shallow scrape on open ground often near water. The clutch is 2–4 eggs which have a cream background with black or dark brown blotches, spots or streaks. On average the eggs measure 32 mm × 24 mm (1.26 in × 0.94 in) and weigh 10 g (0.35 oz). Beginning after the last egg is laid, they are incubated by both parents and hatch synchronously after 17-19 days. The young are precocial and nidifugous. They leave the nest after 2–3 days and are then cared for by both parents who feed them with regurgitated food for the first week. The young fledge when they are 25–30 days of age.

== Status and conservation ==
The collared pratincole is one of the species to which the Agreement on the Conservation of African-Eurasian Migratory Waterbirds (AEWA) applies.

== Sources ==
- Cramp, Stanley, ed. (1983). "Glareola pratincola Collared pratincole". Handbook of the Birds of Europe the Middle East and North Africa. The Birds of the Western Palearctic. Vol. III: Waders to Gulls. Oxford: Oxford University Press. pp. 99–107. ISBN 978-0-19-857506-1.
