= Outline of the Czech Republic =

Landlocked country in Central Europe

The Flag of the Czech Republic

The Coat of arms of the Czech Republic

The location of the Czech Republic

Flag-map of the Czech Republic

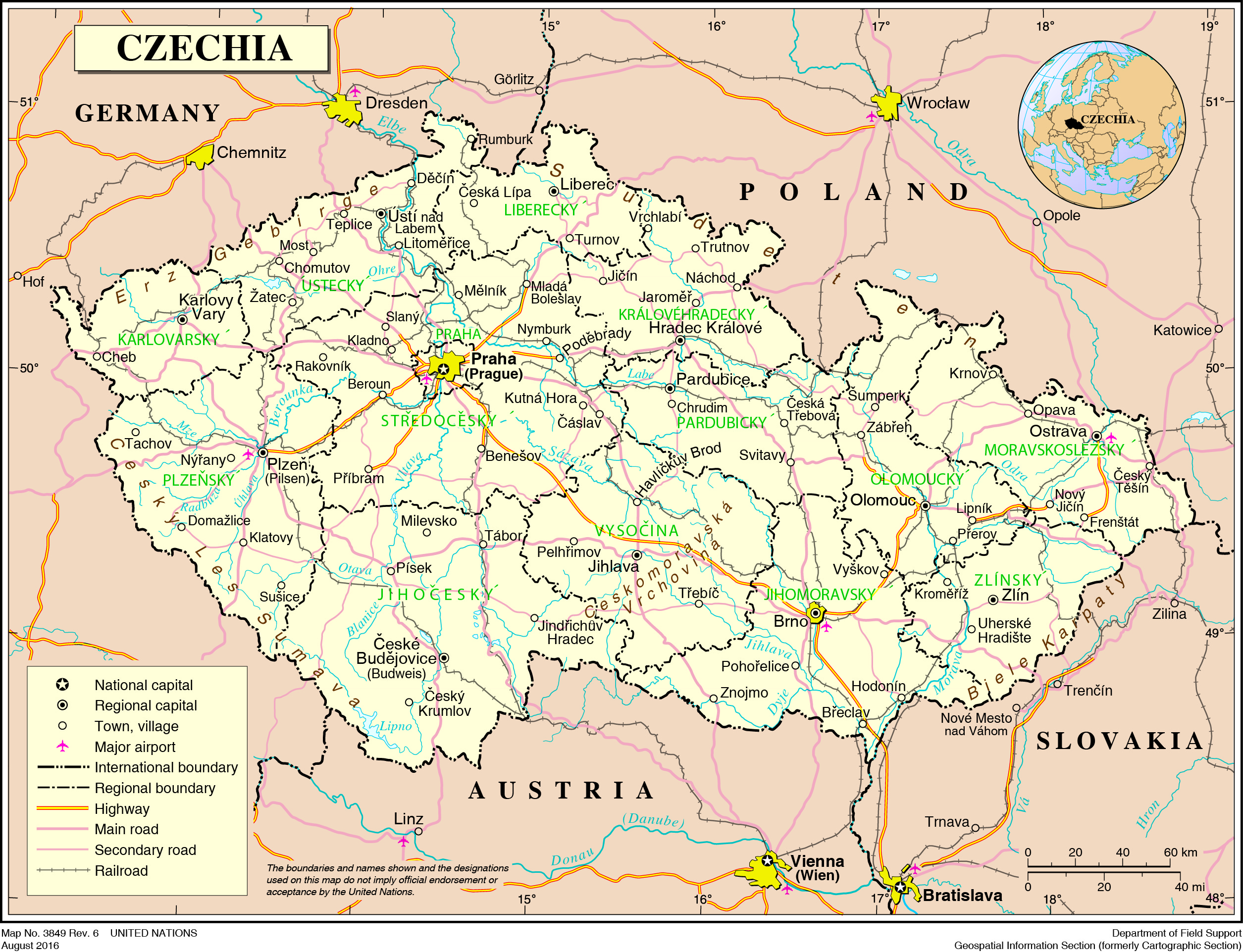
An enlargeable map of the Czech Republic

The following outline is provided as an overview of and topical guide to the Czech Republic:

The Czech Republic (also known as Czechia) is a landlocked country in Central Europe. On 1 January 1993, Czechoslovakia peacefully dissolved into its constituent states, the Czech Republic and Slovakia. The Czech Republic is bordered by Poland to the north, Germany to the west, Austria to the south and Slovakia to the east. Its capital and largest city, with 1.3 million inhabitants, is Prague. It is a pluralist multi-party parliamentary representative democracy, a member of the European Union, NATO, the OECD, the OSCE, the Council of Europe, and the Visegrád Group. The country is divided into three Czech lands: Bohemia, Moravia and Czech Silesia.

== General reference ==
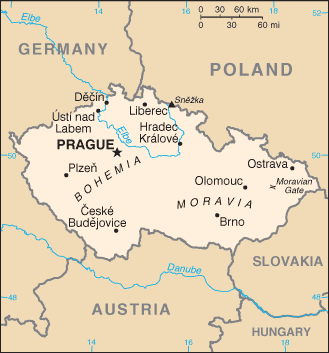
An enlargeable basic map of the Czech Republic

- Pronunciation:
  - Czech Republic /ˈtʃɛk/
  - Czechia /ˈtʃɛkiə/
- Common English country name: The Czech Republic
- Official short English country name: Czechia
- Official long English country name: The Czech Republic
- Common endonym(s): Česko
- Official endonym(s): Česká republika
- Adjective(s): Czech
- Demonym(s): Czechs
- Etymology: Name of the Czech Republic
- International rankings of the Czech Republic
- ISO country codes: CZ, CZE, 203
- ISO region codes: See ISO 3166-2:CZ
- Internet country code top-level domain: .cz

== Geography of the Czech Republic ==
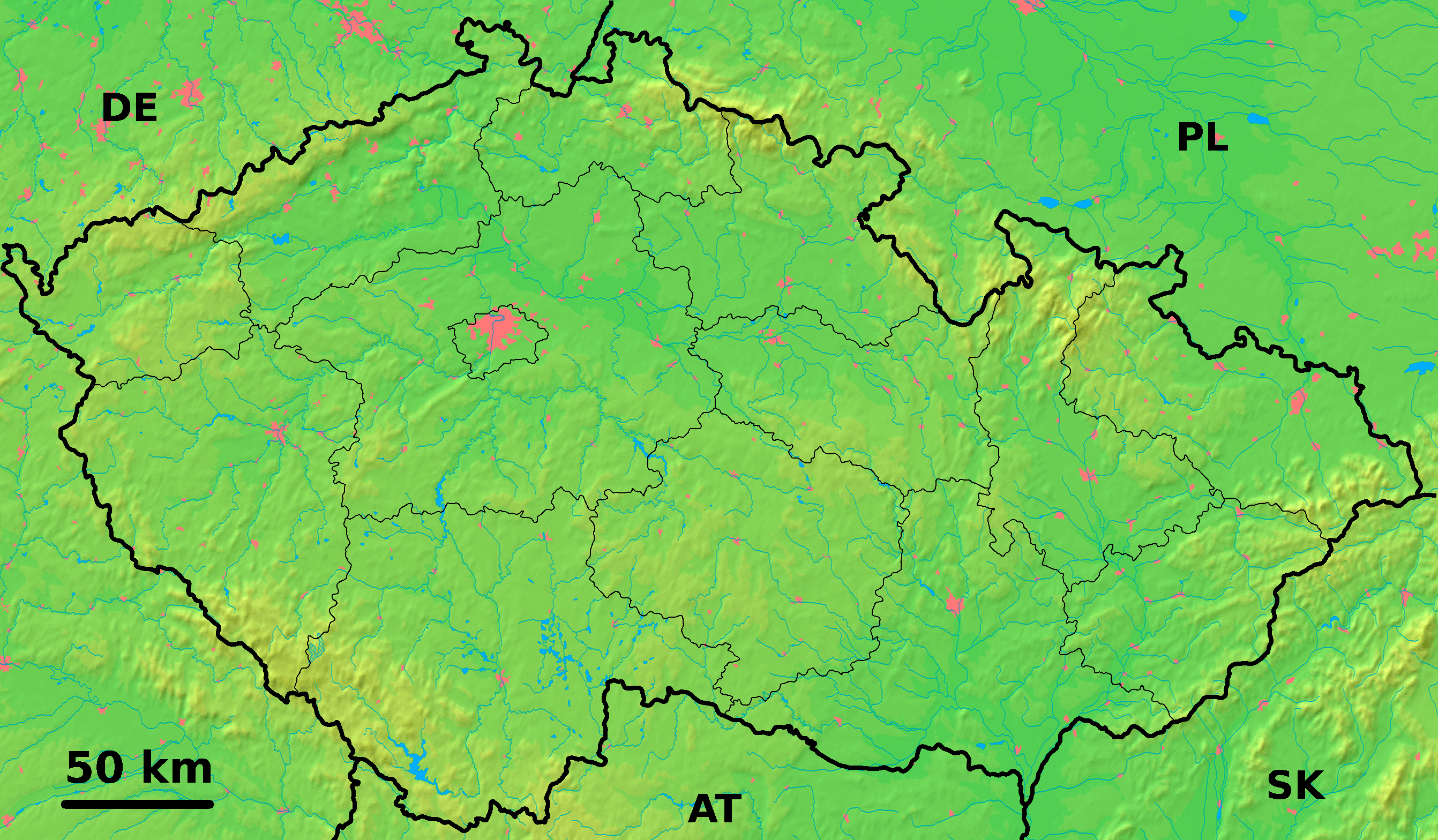
An enlargeable topographic map of the Czech Republic

- The Czech Republic is: a landlocked country
- Location:
  - Northern Hemisphere and Eastern Hemisphere
  - Eurasia
    - Europe
      - Central Europe
  - Time zone: Central European Time (UTC+01), Central European Summer Time (UTC+02)
  - Extreme points of the Czech Republic
    - High: Sněžka 1,603 m (5,259 ft)
    - Low: Elbe 115 m (377 ft)
  - Land boundaries: 1,989 km

Germany 815 km
Poland 615 km
Austria 362 km
Slovakia 197 km

  - Coastline: none
- Population of the Czech Republic: 10,900,555 (1 January 2024)
- Area of the Czech Republic: 78,866 km^{2} (30,450 sq mi), 116th in the world
- Atlas of the Czech Republic

=== Environment of the Czech Republic ===
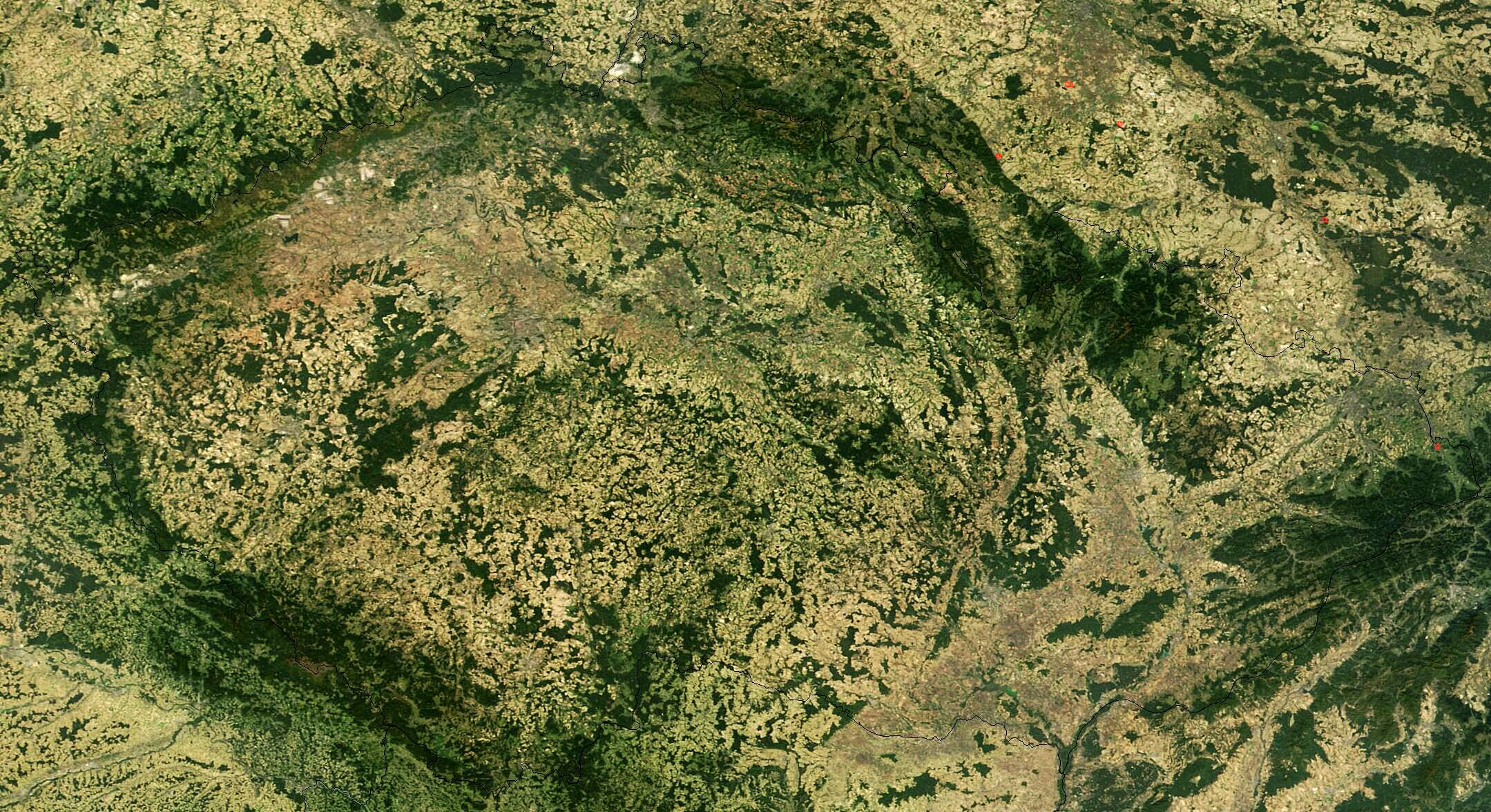
An enlargeable satellite image of the Czech Republic

- Climate of the Czech Republic
- Renewable energy in the Czech Republic
- Protected areas of the Czech Republic
  - Biosphere reserves in the Czech Republic
  - National parks of the Czech Republic
- Wildlife of the Czech Republic
  - Fauna of the Czech Republic
    - Birds of the Czech Republic
    - Mammals of the Czech Republic

==== Natural geographic features of the Czech Republic ====
- Dams and reservoirs in the Czech Republic
- Lakes of the Czech Republic
- Mountains in the Czech Republic
- Ponds of the Czech Republic
- Rivers of the Czech Republic
- World Heritage Sites in the Czech Republic

==== Ecoregions of the Czech Republic ====
List of ecoregions in the Czech Republic

==== Administrative divisions of the Czech Republic ====
Administrative divisions of the Czech Republic

===== Regions of the Czech Republic =====
Region Name (Kraj)	Administrative Capital
Prague	Prague
Central Bohemia	Prague
South Bohemia	České Budějovice
Plzeň	Plzeň
Karlovy Vary	Karlovy Vary
Ústí nad Labem	Ústí nad Labem
Liberec	Liberec
Hradec Králové	Hradec Králové
Pardubice	Pardubice
Vysočina	Jihlava
South Moravia	Brno
Olomouc	Olomouc
Zlín	Zlín
Moravian-Silesia	Ostrava

===== Districts of the Czech Republic =====
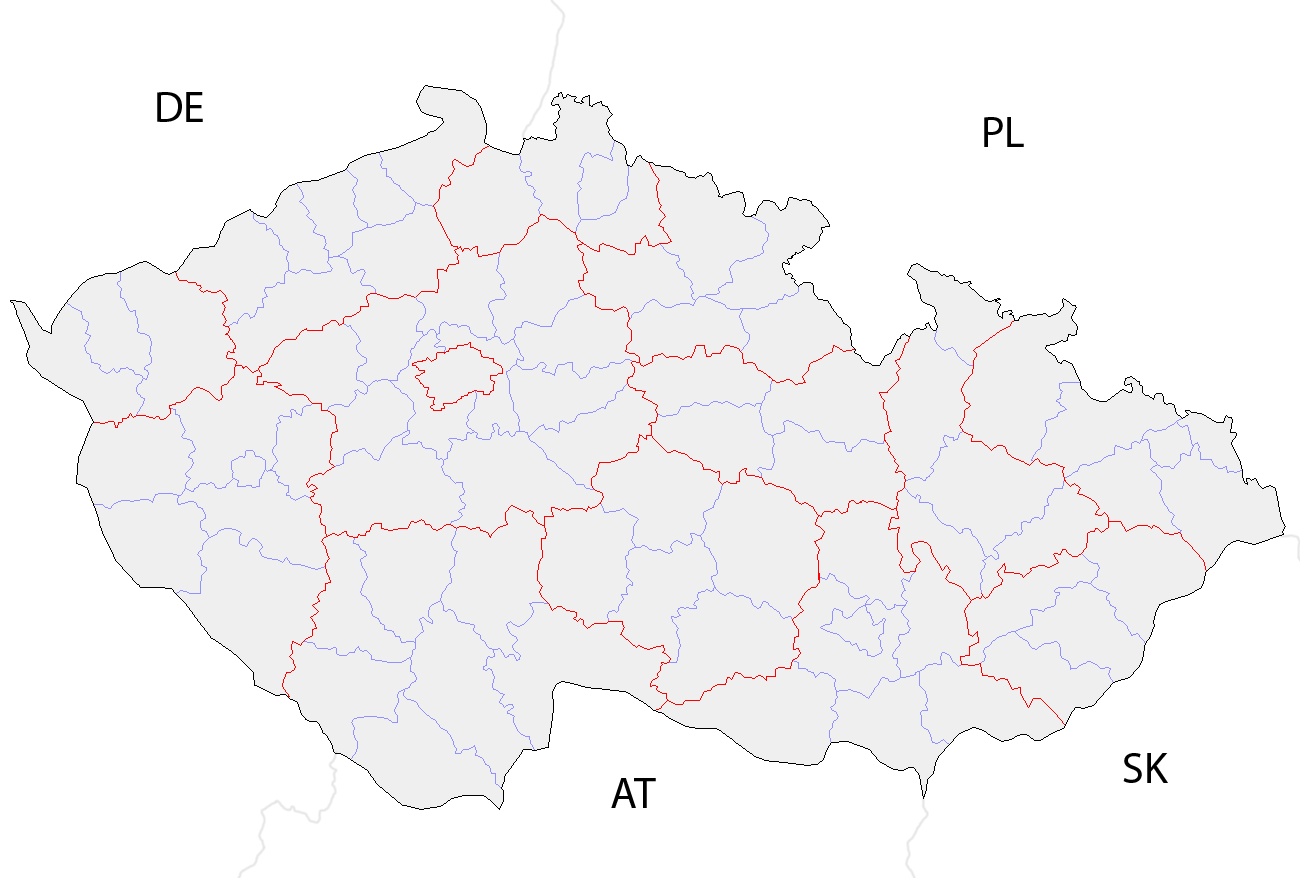

===== Municipalities of the Czech Republic =====
- Municipalities of the Czech Republic: Obec
- Capital of the Czech Republic: Prague (outline)
- Cities in the Czech Republic
  - List of twin towns and sister cities in the Czech Republic

=== Demographics of the Czech Republic ===
- Demographics of the Czech Republic

== Government and politics of the Czech Republic ==
Politics of the Czech Republic

- Form of government: unitary parliamentary representative democratic republic
- Capital of the Czech Republic: Prague
- Elections in the Czech Republic
- Political parties in the Czech Republic

=== Branches of the government of the Czech Republic ===
==== Executive branch of the government of the Czech Republic ====
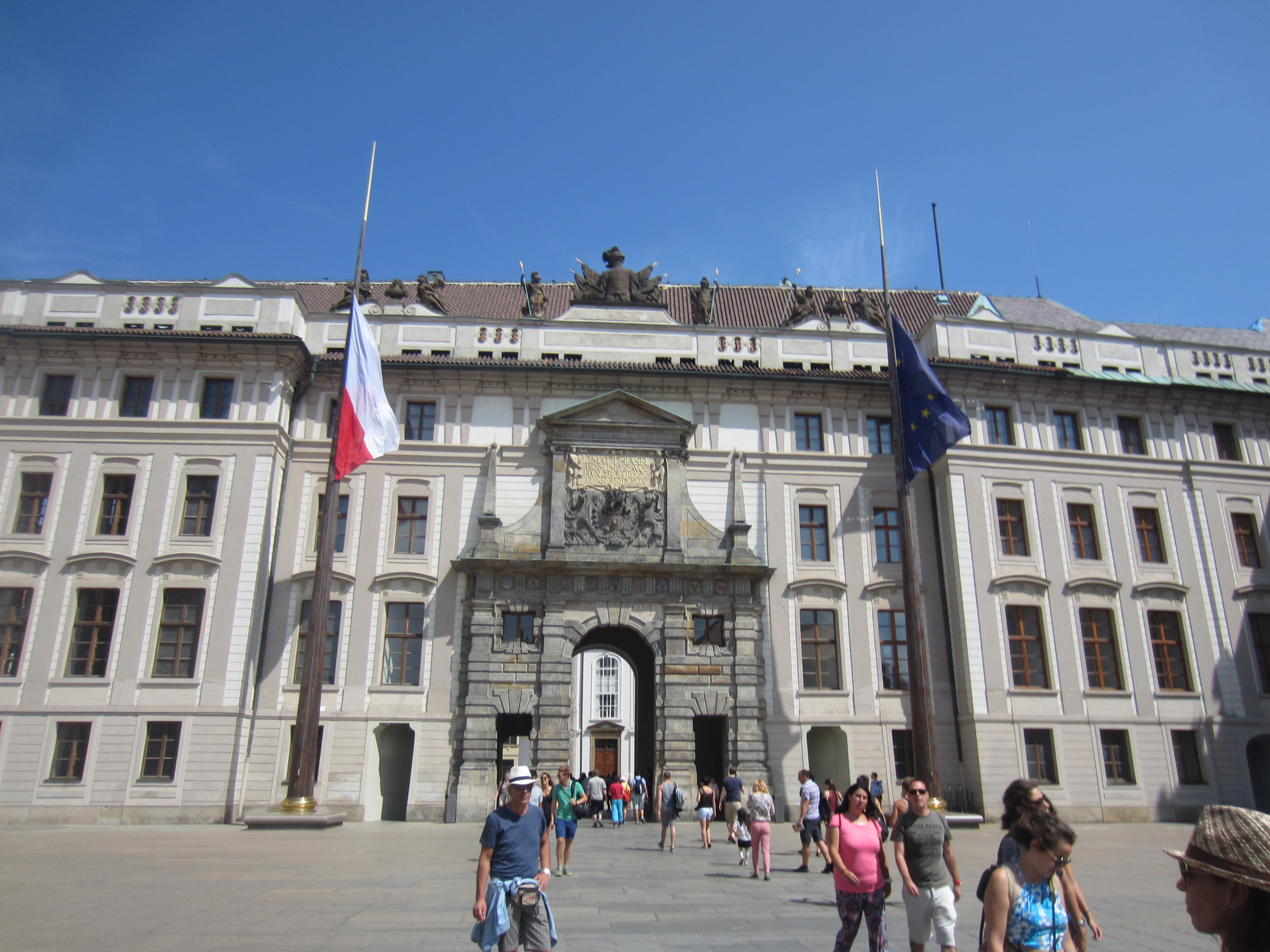
New Royal Palace (Prague Castle)

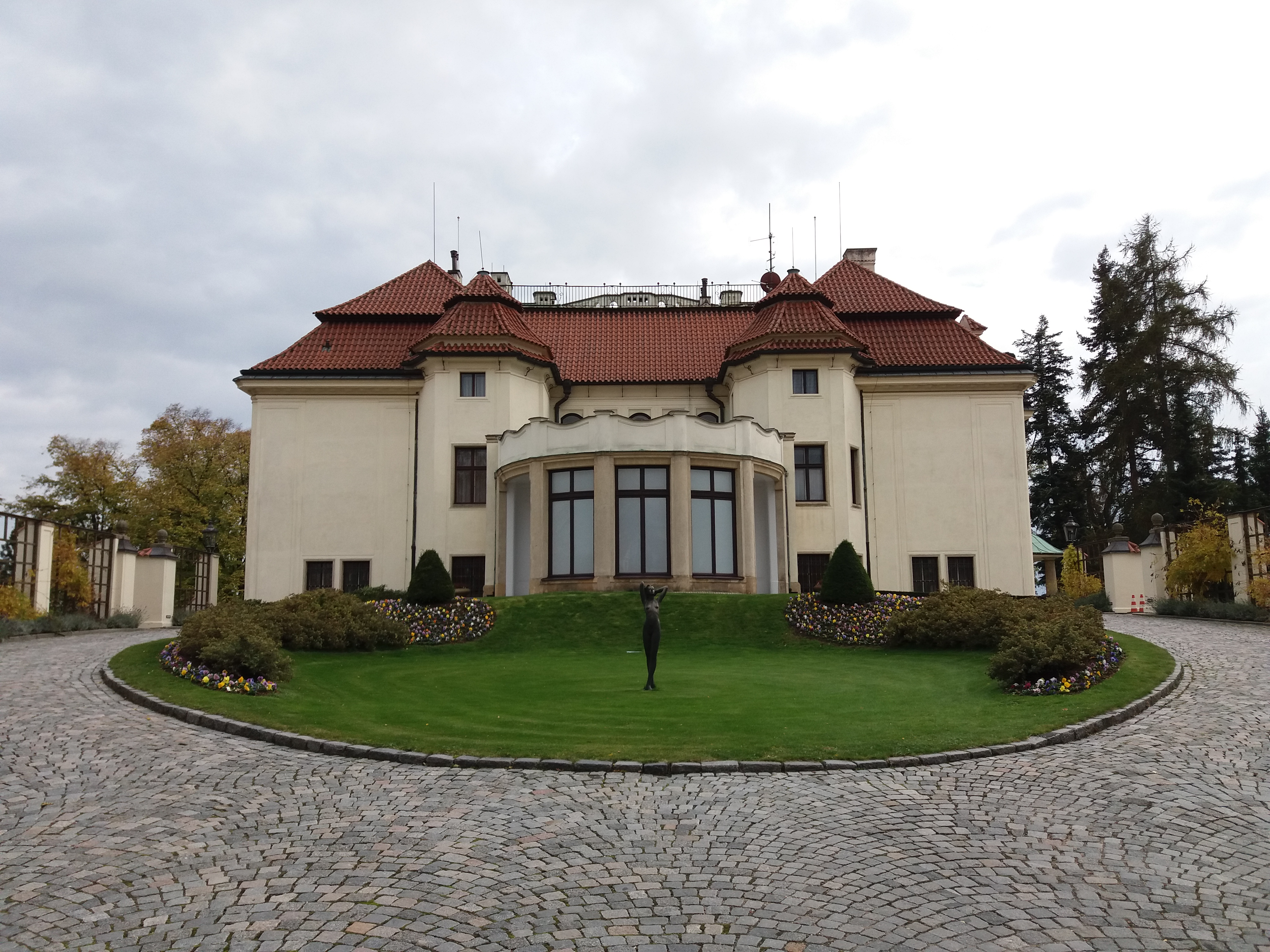
Kramář's Villa

- Head of state: President
  - List of presidents of the Czech Republic
- Head of government: Prime Minister
  - List of prime ministers of the Czech Republic
- Cabinet of the Czech Republic

==== Legislative branch of the government of the Czech Republic ====
- Parliament of the Czech Republic (bicameral)
  - Upper house: Senate
  - Lower house: Chamber of Deputies

==== Judicial branch of the government of the Czech Republic ====
Judiciary of the Czech Republic

- Constitutional Court of the Czech Republic
- Supreme Court of the Czech Republic
- Supreme Administrative Court of the Czech Republic

=== Foreign relations of the Czech Republic ===
Foreign relations of the Czech Republic

- Diplomatic missions in the Czech Republic
- Diplomatic missions of the Czech Republic
- Visegrád Group

==== International organization membership ====
The Czech Republic is a member of:

- Australia Group
- Bank for International Settlements (BIS)
- Black Sea Economic Cooperation Zone (BSEC) (observer)
- Central European Initiative (CEI)
- Confederation of European Paper Industries (CEPI)
- Council of Europe (CE)
- Euro-Atlantic Partnership Council (EAPC)
- European Bank for Reconstruction and Development (EBRD)
- European Investment Bank (EIB)
- European Organization for Nuclear Research (CERN)
- European Space Agency (ESA) (cooperating state)
- European Union (EU)
- Food and Agriculture Organization (FAO)
- International Atomic Energy Agency (IAEA)
- International Bank for Reconstruction and Development (IBRD)
- International Chamber of Commerce (ICC)
- International Civil Aviation Organization (ICAO)
- International Criminal Court (ICCt) (signatory)
- International Criminal Police Organization (Interpol)
- International Development Association (IDA)
- International Energy Agency (IEA)
- International Federation of Red Cross and Red Crescent Societies (IFRCS)
- International Finance Corporation (IFC)
- International Labour Organization (ILO)
- International Maritime Organization (IMO)
- International Mobile Satellite Organization (IMSO)
- International Monetary Fund (IMF)
- International Olympic Committee (IOC)
- International Organization for Migration (IOM)
- International Organization for Standardization (ISO)
- International Red Cross and Red Crescent Movement (ICRM)
- International Telecommunication Union (ITU)
- International Telecommunications Satellite Organization (ITSO)
- International Trade Union Confederation (ITUC)
- Inter-Parliamentary Union (IPU)
- Multilateral Investment Guarantee Agency (MIGA)
- Nonaligned Movement (NAM) (guest)
- North Atlantic Treaty Organization (NATO)
- Nuclear Energy Agency (NEA)
- Nuclear Suppliers Group (NSG)
- Organisation internationale de la Francophonie (OIF) (observer)
- Organisation for Economic Co-operation and Development (OECD)
- Organization for Security and Cooperation in Europe (OSCE)
- Organisation for the Prohibition of Chemical Weapons (OPCW)
- Organization of American States (OAS) (observer)
- Permanent Court of Arbitration (PCA)
- Schengen Convention
- United Nations (UN)
- United Nations Conference on Trade and Development (UNCTAD)
- United Nations Educational, Scientific, and Cultural Organization (UNESCO)
- United Nations Industrial Development Organization (UNIDO)
- United Nations Mission in Liberia (UNMIL)
- United Nations Observer Mission in Georgia (UNOMIG)
- United Nations Organization Mission in the Democratic Republic of the Congo (MONUC)
- Universal Postal Union (UPU)
- Western European Union (WEU) (associate)
- World Confederation of Labour (WCL)
- World Customs Organization (WCO)
- World Federation of Trade Unions (WFTU)
- World Health Organization (WHO)
- World Intellectual Property Organization (WIPO)
- World Meteorological Organization (WMO)
- World Tourism Organization (UNWTO)
- World Trade Organization (WTO)
- World Veterans Federation
- Zangger Committee (ZC)

=== Law and order in the Czech Republic ===
Law of the Czech Republic

- Cannabis in the Czech Republic
- Capital punishment in the Czech Republic
- Constitution of the Czech Republic
- Czech nationality law
- Crime in the Czech Republic
- Human rights in the Czech Republic
  - LGBTQ rights in the Czech Republic
- Judiciary of the Czech Republic
- Law enforcement in the Czech Republic

=== Military of the Czech Republic ===
Military of the Czech Republic

- Command
  - Commander-in-chief:
    - Ministry of Defence of the Czech Republic
- Forces
  - Army of the Czech Republic
  - Navy of the Czech Republic: None (it's a landlocked country)
  - Air Force of the Czech Republic
- Military history of the Czech Republic

=== Local government in the Czech Republic ===
Local government in the Czech Republic

== History of the Czech Republic ==
History of the Czech Republic

- List of Bohemian monarchs
- Military history of the Czech Republic

== Culture of the Czech Republic ==
Culture of the Czech Republic

- Architecture of the Czech Republic
  - Czech Baroque architecture
  - Czech Gothic architecture
  - Czech Renaissance architecture
  - Urban planning in the Czech Republic
- Cuisine of the Czech Republic
  - Beer in the Czech Republic
- Languages of the Czech Republic
  - Czech alphabet
  - háček
  - Minority languages of the Czech Republic
- Media in the Czech Republic
- Museums in the Czech Republic
- Mythology
  - Libuše
  - Přemysl the Ploughman
  - Lech, Czech, and Rus
  - Golem
- National symbols of the Czech Republic
  - Coat of arms of the Czech Republic
  - Crown of Saint Wenceslas
  - Flag of the Czech Republic
  - National anthem of the Czech Republic
- People of the Czech Republic
  - Lists of Czechs
- Prostitution in the Czech Republic
- Public holidays in the Czech Republic
- Religion in the Czech Republic
  - Buddhism in the Czech Republic
  - Christianity in the Czech Republic
  - Hinduism in the Czech Republic
  - Islam in the Czech Republic
  - Judaism in the Czech Republic
- Youth in the Czech Republic

=== Art in the Czech Republic ===
- Cinema of the Czech Republic
  - Barrandov Studios
  - Czechoslovak New Wave
  - Karlovy Vary International Film Festival
- Literature of the Czech Republic
  - National Library of the Czech Republic
  - Franz Kafka Prize
- Music of the Czech Republic
  - Czech Philharmonic
  - Prague Spring International Music Festival
  - List of Czech musical groups
- Television in the Czech Republic
  - List of Czech television programmes
- Theatre of the Czech Republic
  - National Theatre (Prague)
- Video gaming in the Czech Republic
- Visual arts of the Czech Republic
  - Czech Cubism
  - National Gallery in Prague
  - Decorative arts in the Czech Republic
    - Bohemian glass
    - Museum of Decorative Arts in Prague

=== Sport in the Czech Republic ===
Sport in the Czech Republic

- Athletics in the Czech Republic
  - Běchovice – Prague Race
  - Golden Spike Ostrava
  - Josef Odložil Memorial
  - Prague Marathon
- Football in the Czech Republic
  - Football Association of the Czech Republic
  - Czech Republic national football team
  - Czech First League
  - Czech National Football League
  - Czech Cup
  - Czech Republic football league system
- Ice hockey in the Czech Republic
  - Czech Republic men's national ice hockey team
  - Czech Extraliga
- Motorsport in the Czech Republic
  - Czech Republic motorcycle Grand Prix
  - Speedway Grand Prix of Czech Republic
- Czech Republic at the Olympics
  - Czech Olympic Committee
- Tennis in the Czech Republic
  - Czech Republic Davis Cup team
  - Czech Republic Billie Jean King Cup team

==== Other sport ====
- Rugby league in the Czech Republic
- Rugby union in the Czech Republic
- Sokol movement

== Economy and infrastructure of the Czech Republic ==
Economy of the Czech Republic

- Economic rank, by (PPP) per capita GDP (2012): 35th in world
- Economic rank, by nominal GDP (2007): 39th in world
- Communications in the Czech Republic
  - Internet in the Czech Republic
  - List of radio stations in the Czech Republic
  - Television in the Czech Republic
- Companies of the Czech Republic
- Currency of the Czech Republic: Koruna
  - ISO 4217: CZK
  - Czech National Bank
- Energy in the Czech Republic
  - Temelín Nuclear Power Station
  - Dukovany Nuclear Power Station
- Tourism in the Czech Republic
- Transport in the Czech Republic
  - České dráhy
  - List of Czech cars
  - Airports in the Czech Republic
  - Prague Metro
  - Rail transport in the Czech Republic

== Education in the Czech Republic ==
Education in the Czech Republic

- List of schools in the Czech Republic
- List of universities in the Czech Republic

== Health in the Czech Republic ==
- Health in the Czech Republic

== See also ==
Czech Republic

- List of international rankings
- Member state of the European Union
- Member state of the North Atlantic Treaty Organization
- Member state of the United Nations
- Outline of Europe
- Outline of geography
- Spa towns in the Czech Republic
