= Fauna of the Czech Republic =

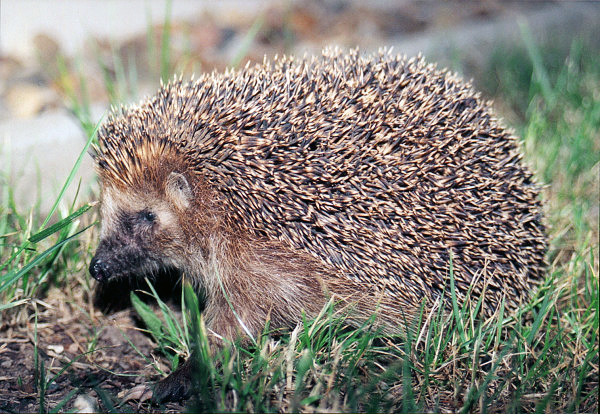

The fauna of the Czech Republic includes a wide variety of animal species.

Some species (especially endangered ones) are bred in reserves. Among the rare animals are, for example, hedgehogs, eagles, ospreys, bustards, and storks.

== Number of species in the Czech Republic ==
There are approximately 40,000 animal species in the Czech Republic.

- Protozoa - yes (worldwide ~ 31 000)
- Porifera - yes
- Cnidaria / Hydrozoa - 4
- Platyhelminthes
  - Platyhelminthes / Catenulida, Macrostomida and Neorhabdocoela - 18
  - Platyhelminthes / Tricladida - 16
- Nemertea - 1
- Rotifera - probably 500
- Gastrotricha - 24
- Nematoda - from 501 to 5000 ?
- molluscs Mollusca - 247 in the wild, and at least 11 species in greenhouses. See List of non-marine molluscs of the Czech Republic
- Annelida - probably 220 including Slovakia
  - Annelida / Aeolosomata and Oligochaeta (water species) - 81
  - Annelida / leeches Hirudinea - 19. See List of leeches of the Czech Republic
  - Annelida / Lumbricidae - 46
- Nematomorpha - few
- Acanthocephala - yes
- Tardigrada - 100
- spiders Araneae - 849 - see
- scorpions Scorpiones - 1
- Pseudoscorpionida - 25
- Opilionida - 31 - see
- Acarina
  - Acarina / Mesostigmata - yes
  - Acarina / Ixodides - 22
  - Acarina / Prostigmata - 10
  - Acarina / Eriophyoidea - yes
  - Acarina (water) - 432
  - Acarina / Oribatida - 548
- crustaceans Crustacea
  - Crustacea / Anostraca - 5
  - Crustacea / Notostraca - 2
  - Crustacea / Spinicaudata - 4
  - Crustacea / Cladocera - 105
  - Crustacea / Ostracoda - 74
  - Crustacea / Copepoda - 82
  - Crustacea / Isopoda / Oniscidea - 52
  - Crustacea / Isopoda (water) - 2
  - Crustacea / Amphipoda - 8
  - Crustacea / Decapoda - 6
- Chilopoda - 67
- Diplopoda - 65
- Protura - 32
- Collembola - probably 400
- Campodeina and Japygina - 10

insects - Insecta

- Zygentoma - 4
- Ephemeroptera - 97
- Odonata - 70
- Plecoptera - 80
- Blattodea - 5
- Mantodea - 1
- Ensifera and Caelifera - 93
- Dermaptera - 6
- Psocoptera - 70
- Thysanoptera - 230
- Heteroptera (land species) - 790
- Heteroptera (water species) - 60
- Auchenorrhyncha - 533
- Sternorrhyncha / Psyllinea - 116
- Sternorrhyncha / Aleyrodinea - 20
- Sternorrhyncha / Aphidinea - 689
- Sternorrhyncha / Coccinea - 140
- Trichoptera - 239
- Mecoptera - 9
- Neuroptera (land species) - 82
- Neuroptera (water species) - 3
- Raphidioptera - 10
- Megaloptera - 3
- Lepidoptera - 3200 - see List of Lepidoptera of the Czech Republic
- Lepidoptera (water species) - 6
- Diptera - 6500 including Slovakia
- Hymenoptera - ?

vertebrates - altogether probably 550 species

- Cyclostomata - 3
- fishes - probably 65 - see cs:seznam ryb v Česku
- amphibians - about 20
- reptiles - about 12 see List of herpetofauna of the Czech Republic
- birds - 415 - see List of birds of the Czech Republic
- mammals - about 100 - see List of mammals of the Czech Republic, cs:seznam netopýrů v Česku

== See also ==
- List of mammals of the Czech Republic
- List of birds of the Czech Republic
- List of leeches of the Czech Republic
- List of non-marine molluscs of the Czech Republic
- List of Lepidoptera of the Czech Republic
- List of herpetofauna of the Czech Republic
