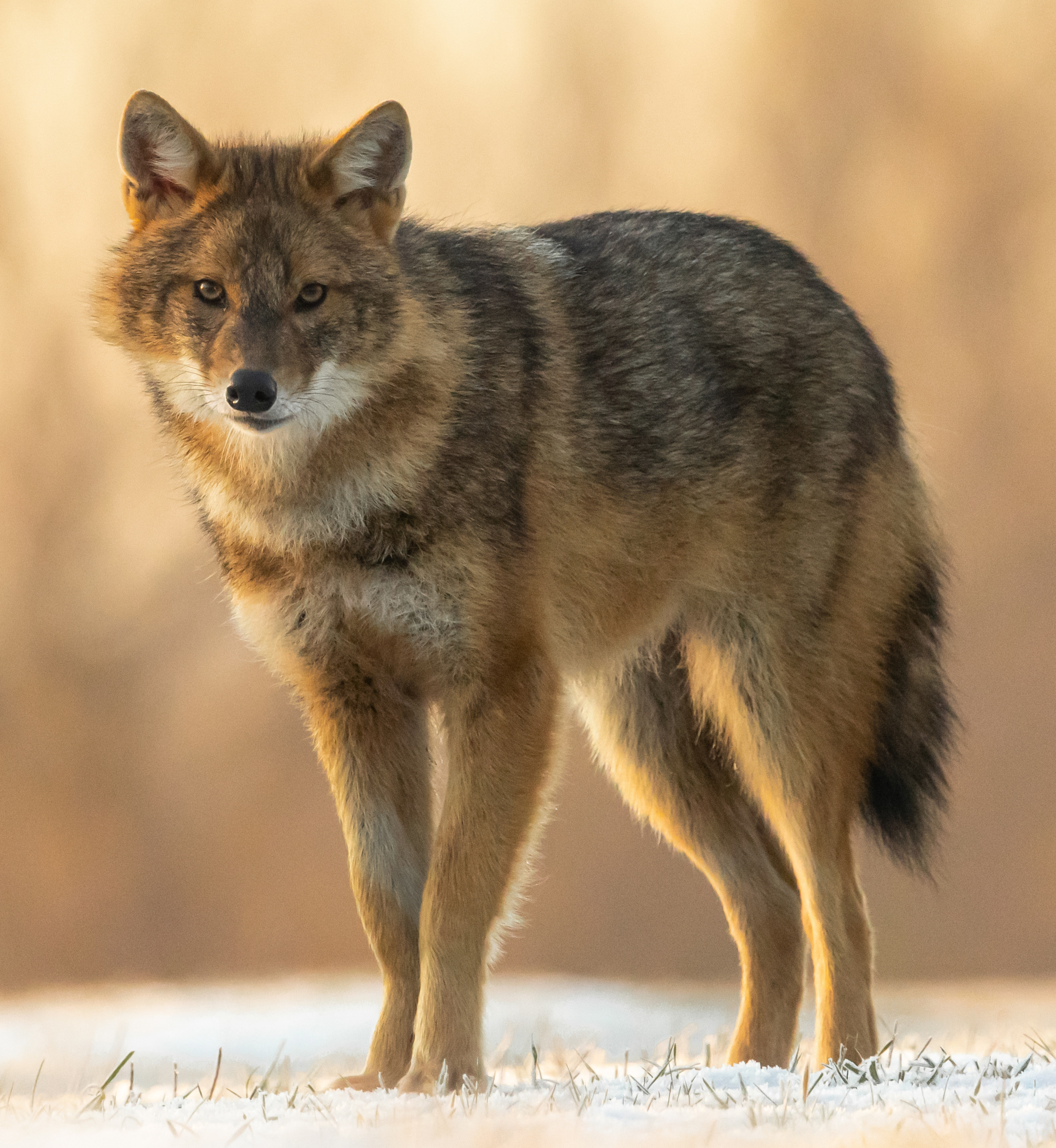
- European jackal in Carska Bara bogland, Serbia

Conservation status
- Least Concern (IUCN 3.1)

Scientific classification
- Kingdom: Animalia
- Phylum: Chordata
- Class: Mammalia
- Order: Carnivora
- Family: Canidae
- Genus: Canis
- Species: C. aureus
- Subspecies: C. a. moreoticus

Trinomial name
- Canis aureus moreoticus I. Geoffroy Saint-Hilaire, 1836
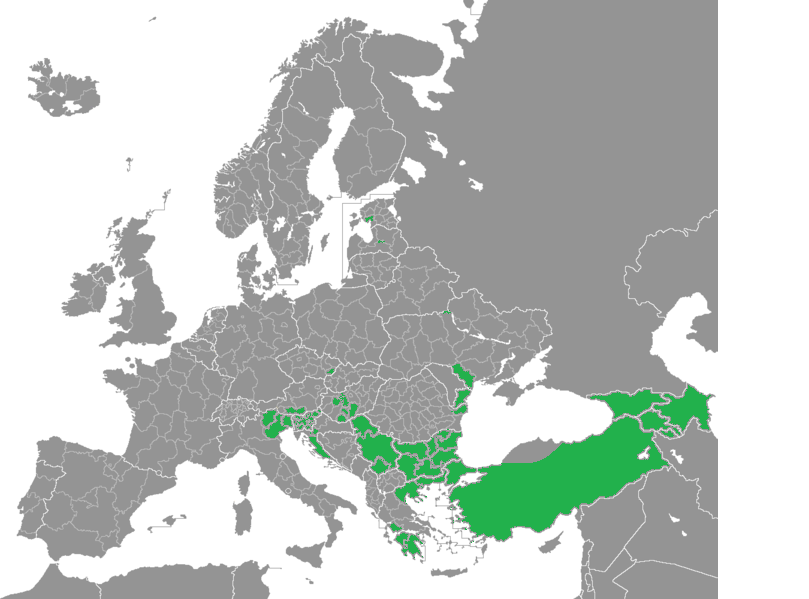
- Partial map of the distribution in the mid 2010s

Synonyms
- C. a. graecus (Wagner, 1841)

= European jackal =

Subspecies of carnivore

The European jackal (Canis aureus moreoticus) is a subspecies of the golden jackal present in Anatolia, the Caucasus, and Southeast Europe. It was first described by French naturalist Isidore Geoffroy Saint-Hilaire during the Morea expedition. There were an estimated 70,000 jackals in Europe according to one source; another source gives an estimate of 97,000 to 117,000 individuals. Though mostly found in South-Southeastern Europe, its range has grown to encompass parts of the Baltic in Northeastern Europe, in Eastern Europe (Poland), Southern Europe, mostly in Italy (first observed in 1984), with further sightings in Western Europe (including in France, Germany); several other countries in mainland Europe have reported the jackals as vagrants. One theory, which has been set forth to explain the rapid spread of the species since the 1970s to colonise European areas in which they were perhaps likely never historically native, is that grey wolf populations are less abundant than in the historic past.

== Etymology ==
The use of the word jackal travelled from the Sanskrit term शृगाल (śṛgāla), which means "the howler", to the Persian شغال (šaġāl), then the Ottoman Turkish چقال (çakâl) and from the Ottoman expansion in eastern Europe to several European languages. Pre and non Ottoman names that were used in European languages where the European jackal was present, were θως (thos), λυκοπάνθηρ (lycopanther), and σκυλάκι (squilachi) in Greek, hilac and lupul de stuf in Romanian, nádifarkas in Hungarian and Rohrwolf in Austrian/German. The names "lupul de stuf", "nádifarkas" and "Rohrwolf" translate as reed wolf and though there has been some confusion about its identification as a grey wolf subspecies or a golden jackal, as Éhik mentioned clearly, already in 1938: The reed-wolf can not be a subspecies of Canis lupus, because the latter was allways occurring (and also bearing!) in the Great Hungarian Plains and two subspecies can not live at the same time on the same territory.

== Physical description ==
The European subspecies, consistent with Bergmann's rule, is the largest of the golden jackals, with animals of both sexes measuring 120–125 cm (47–49 in) in total length and 10–13 kg (20–29 lb) in body weight. One adult male in North-Eastern Italy is recorded to have reached 14.9 kg (33 lb). The fur is coarse, and is generally brightly coloured with blackish tones on the back. The thighs, upper legs, ears and forehead are bright reddish chestnut. Jackals in Northern Dalmatia have broader than average skulls, which is thought to result from human induced isolation from other populations, thus resulting in a new morphotype.

== Diet ==
In the Caucasus, jackals mainly hunt hares, small rodents, pheasants, partridges, ducks, coots, moorhens and passerines. They readily eat lizards, snakes, frogs, fish, molluscs and insects. During the winter period, they will kill many nutrias and waterfowl. During such times, jackals will surplus kill and cache what they do not eat. Jackals will feed on fruits, such as pears, hawthorn, dogwood and the cones of common medlars. Golden jackals tend not to be as damaging to livestock as wolves and red foxes are, though they can become a serious nuisance to small sized stock when in high numbers. The highest number of livestock damages occurred in southern Bulgaria: 1,053 attacks on small stock, mainly sheep and lambs, were recorded between 1982 and 1987, along with some damages to newborn deer in game farms.

In Greece, rodents, insects, carrion, and fruits comprise the jackal's diet. However, they rarely eat garbage, due to large numbers of stray dogs preventing them access to places with high human density. Jackals in Turkey have been known to eat the eggs of the endangered green sea-turtle. In Hungary, their most frequent prey are common voles and bank voles. In Dalmatia, mammals (the majority being even-toed ungulates and lagomorphs) made up 50.3% of the golden jackal's diet, fruit seeds (14% each being common fig and common grape vine, while 4.6% are Juniperus oxycedrus) and vegetables 34.1%, insects (16% orthoptera, 12% beetles, and 3% dictyoptera) 29.5%, birds and their eggs 24.8%, artificial food 24%, and branches, leaves, and grass 24%. Information on the diet of jackals in northeastern Italy is scant, but it is certain that they prey on small roe deer and hares.

== Distribution ==
The jackal's current European range mostly encompasses the Balkan region, where the population had been reduced in many areas by the 1960s, with core populations occurring in scattered regions such as Strandja, the Dalmatian Coast, while it was still very numerous and widespread at the lowlands of mainland Greece and some Greek Islands, in the beginning of the decade. It recolonised its former territories in Bulgaria during 1962, following legislative protection. Subsequently, from the 1980s onward, expanded its range westward into Serbia, Slovenia, Austria and Italy, and as far North as Northwestern Romania, Hungary and Slovakia.

The golden jackal is listed as an Annex V species in the EU Habitats Directive and as such may be hunted or killed in Estonia, Greece and all other EU member states, should these states allow this based on their own laws, but the population must be monitored and submitted to the European Commission every six years.

In Turkey, Romania, the North Black Sea coast, and the Caucasus region, the status of jackals was largely unknown in 2004. There were indications of expanding populations in Romania and the north-western Black Sea coast, and reports of decline in Turkey.

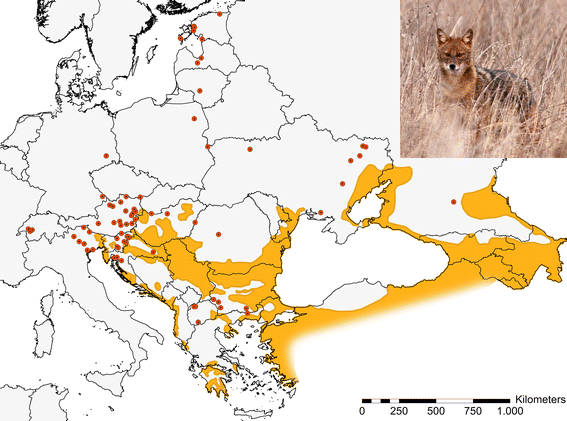
The distribution of the golden jackal across Europe in 2015. Shaded areas represent permanent residence and circles represent individual records.

=== Balkans and farther East ===
Jackal populations in Albania however till recently were on the verge of extinction with possible occurrence in only three lowland wetland locations along the Adriatic Sea.

In Bosnia and Herzegovina, jackals were a rare species. From 1920 to 1999, only a few observations in the south of the country. However, at the beginning of this century, their significant presence in the north of the country is an obvious example of expansion of the jackals on the European continent.

Bulgaria has the largest jackal population in Europe, which went through a 33–fold increase in range from the early-1960s to mid-1980s. Factors aiding this increase include the replacement of natural forests with dense scrub, an increase in animal carcasses from state game farms, reductions in wolf populations and the abandonment of poisoning campaigns. In the early 1990s, it was estimated that up to 5,000 jackals populated Bulgaria. The population increased in 1994, and appears to have stabilised.

In Croatia, a 2007 survey reported 19 jackal packs in the north-western part of Ravni Kotari and two on Vir Island.

In Greece, the golden jackal was at least locally, one of the most common wild mammals, as reported by various sources, during the 18th and the 19th centuries, and the 20th century, till the 1960s. Then, the same period when the recovery began in the nearby Bulgaria, the Greek population collapsed due to intense poison bait campaigns; as of 2000, golden jackals were the rarest of the three wild extant canids there, having disappeared from some islands like Corfu, Lefkada and Euboea and large parts of central Greece, western Greece and, being limited to disjunct, isolated population clusters in Peloponnese, Phocis, Samos Island, Halkidiki and north-eastern Greece. Since around 2010, the species recovered and reappeared over much of its original distribution, even to places where it was not known before. Although listed as 'vulnerable' in the Red Data Book for Greek Vertebrates, the species has neither been officially declared as a game species nor as a protected one.

Jackal populations have been increasing in Serbia since the late 1970s, and occur mainly in north-eastern Serbia and lower Srem. Jackals are especially common near Negotin and Bela Palanka (close to the border with Bulgaria), where, during the 1990s, about 500 specimens were shot.

In European Russia in recent decades, jackals have spread northward, including the Penza Oblast and Volga, with individuals reaching as far north as the subarctic.

In Turkey the jackal is present in the European part and in Asia Minor, mostly in lower altitudes up to 1500-1600 m asl, near the Aegean coast, the Black Sea coast and the south-east, being absent from most from the Anatolian Plateau, with recent expansion trends through valleys towards the latest.

=== Central Europe ===
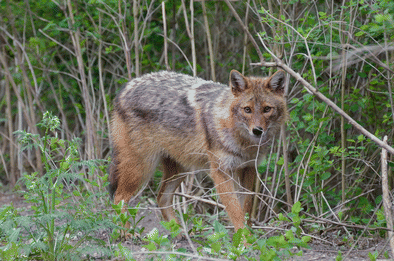
Golden jackal near Biebrza river valley in north-eastern Poland

Golden jackals are listed as a protected species in Slovenia, where they were first spotted in 1952 and have also established permanent territories there. In 2005, a probably vagrant female was accidentally shot near Gornji Grad in the Upper Savinja Valley, Northern Slovenia. In 2009, two territorial groups of golden jackal were recorded in the Ljubljana Marsh area, Central Slovenia. It seems that the species continues to expand towards Central Europe.

There have been records of a presence of golden jackals around Geneva in Switzerland since 2011; a camera trap photographed one in 2018. In 2019 the authorities of the Republic and Canton of Geneva revealed the first video footage of one in Switzerland.

In Hungary, golden jackals had disappeared in the 1950s through hunting and habitat destruction, only to return in the late 1970s. The first breeding pairs being detected near the southern border in Transdanubia, then between the River Danube and Tisza. Golden jackals have since increased greatly in number year by year, with some estimates indicating that they now outnumber red foxes. The sighting of a jackal near the Austrian border in the summer of 2007 indicated that they have spread throughout the country.

There have been repeated sightings of jackals in eastern Austria for a few decades. In 2007, the first reproduction was reported in the national park Neusiedler See – Seewinkel. It has since been seen in the western and southern parts of the country, in South Tyrol, Upper Austria, Carinthia and Styria. In 2019, it was spotted for the first time in eastern Tyrol.

The presence of the animals in Germany has been confirmed since the very end of the 1990s. As of 2019, they have been sighted almost throughout the country. They are not thought to have been historically present in Germany before, according to experts warm winter weather may be contributing to their expansion into new territory. They have primarily been observed in nature parks. The first recorded instance of golden jackals breeding in Germany was reported in 2021.

A dead adult was found close to the road near Podolí (Uherské Hradiště District) in the Czech Republic, on 19 March 2006.

The species' presence in Poland was confirmed in 2015 through a necropsy on a roadkilled male found in the northwest and camera trapping of two live specimens in the east.

=== Southern Europe ===
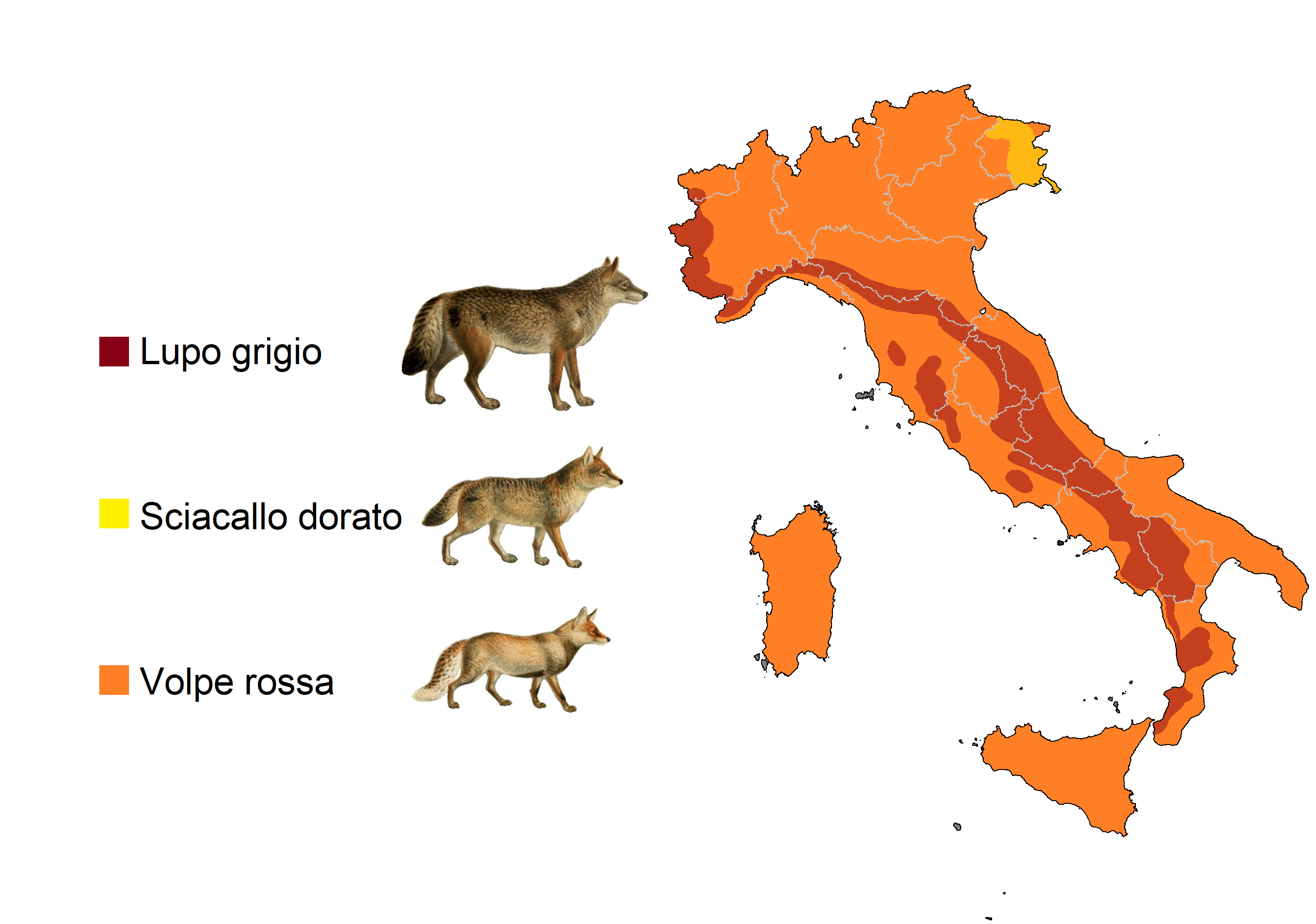
Current range of the golden jackal in Italy (yellow) alongside the range of the red fox and Italian wolf

In Italy, the species is found in the wild in Friuli-Venezia Giulia, Veneto, and Trentino-Alto Adige/Südtirol. In the High Adriatic Hinterland, its distribution has been recently updated by Lapini et al. (2009). In 1984 Canis aureus had reached the Province of Belluno; in 1985, a pack reproduced near Udine (this group was eliminated in 1987); a road-killed jackal was collected in Veneto in 1992, and their presence was then confirmed in the Province of Gorizia, and in the hinterland of the Gulf of Trieste. In these cases, the specimens were usually roaming male subadults, though a family-group was discovered in Agordino in 1994. A young dead female was discovered on 10 December 2009 in Carnia, indicating that the species' range has continued to expand. Moreover, in the late summer of 2009, the species was also signalled in Trentino-Alto Adige/Südtirol, where it has likely reached the Puster Valley. The golden jackal populations in Italy are concentrated in the northeastern portion of the country, but animals have been spotted sporadically south of the River Po. A single specimen was filmed in the Province of Modena in 2017, but no local reproduction was identified. Another specimen was spotted in 2020 near Parma. In January 2021, a survey recorded the presence of the first known breeding group south of the Po. The Italian branch of WWF estimates that jackal numbers in Italy may be underestimated. The golden jackal is a protected animal in Italy.

A golden jackal was photographed in 2024 in Zaragoza (Spain), near the Ebro river. A roadkill animal has been found in Alava in 2023.

=== Western Europe ===
In the Netherlands, presence of a single individual was confirmed through a camera trap at the Veluwe in 2016. Evidence of the presence of the species in this area came again from a camera trap in 2017. An observation in 2018 was revealed to be a marketing stunt. The next observation was from 2019 from a camera trap in Drenthe. The jackal in this country is thought to be as a neophyte: it is not known to have ever inhabited the area. A masters' thesis calculated a possible maximum carrying capacity of 5,000 animals in the Netherlands. Another ecologist, Glenn Lelieveld, remarked that the increasing population of wolves in the Netherlands might as yet have unforeseeable effects. He noted it might find more marshy areas to live, or be pushed out of the larger game parks into more agricultural areas. Lelieveld stressed that the species is still officially vagrant in the country. In order to prove if the species had settled in the country, he used microphones and human reports to find the howling sounds of the animals, and would then rush to the location with a megaphone playing back recordings of jackal howls. If the animals are truly settled in an area, they would howl in back at the recordings to mark their territory; however, as of 2019, this had never occurred. The presence of the animal has proven much less sensational than the return of the wolf.

A golden jackal was photographed in late 2017 in Haute-Savoie, southeastern France. In late 2023, the body of a young female was discovered by a road in Ensuès-la-Redonne, 20 km west of Marseille. It was determined by autopsy to have been born in 2022. This specimen is believed to have been born locally, as the nearest breeding population of golden jackals is 500 km away in northeastern Italy, which is too far for a jackal pup to travel from. While solitary jackals have been previously detected in Haute-Savoie, Deux-Sèvres, Bouches-du-Rhône, Essonne, Alpes-Maritimes, and Finistère through signs such as spoor, hairs, and video footage, these were all determined to be solitary specimens and most likely male.

=== Northern Europe ===
In Denmark the carcass of a roadkilled golden jackal was discovered in September 2015 near Karup in Central Jutland. In August 2016, a live golden jackal was spotted and photographed in Lille Vildmose.

In the beginning of the 21st century, an isolated population was confirmed in western Estonia, much further north than their earlier known range. Whether they were an introduced population or came through natural migration was unknown. The Environmental Board of Estonia classified it as an introduced species, and thus potentially subject to extermination campaigns. However, studies confirmed that animals reached Estonia naturally from Caucasus through Ukraine, which some people take to mean they should not be considered introduced species. They are now treated equally with other hunted animals in Estonia. The number of jackals has grown quickly in coastal areas of Estonia. In 2016, jackals killed over 100 sheep in Estonia and during hunting season in winter 2016/2017, 32 jackals were killed. Due to quick growth of jackal population in 2017 their hunting season was extended by two months for next year, up to six months in a year.

In Finland, first verified record of golden jackal was made near Kajaani in August 2018. During 2018–2022, golden jackals were recorded in total of six localities ranging from southern, central and northern regions of the country.

In July 2020, a camera trap confirmed the presence of a golden jackal from Lakselv in Finnmark, Norway, representing the northernmost occurrence of golden jackals to date. The specimen is thought to have migrated from Finland.

== Origins and presence in European tradition ==
Although present in Europe, jackals are not commonly featured in European folklore or literature. In the former Greek speaking and writing parts of their distribution in the eastern Mediterranean coast were mentioned under the Greek name thos/θως till the Ottoman arrival and the use of the name tsakali/τσακάλι (from Turkish çakal). Ιn similes in the Iliad (dated around 8th century BC) they are described as tawny coloured, gathering together to stalk animals injured by hunters. When the injured animal collapses the jackals devour it until some lion appears and steals their prey. The ancient Greek philosopher Aristotle in 4th century BC wrote that jackals avoid lions and dogs, but they are friendly to people, not being afraid of them. He also stated that their inner parts are identical to those of the wolf, and that they change appearance from summer to winter. Hesychius of Alexandria (5th - 6th century AD) wrote that the jackal is a beast similar to the wolf. Theodosius the grammarian (8th century AD) wrote that θως is a beast species and that the agile/fast persons are thus called θοοί/thoi. With the exception of Greece where it was considered among the most common mammals, being a rare and elusive animal, the jackal was historically often assumed to be an introduced animal if it were sighted elsewhere. The population in Dalmatia was formerly believed to be an independent species Canis dalmatinus. It was widely believed by the inhabitants of Korčula Island that African jackals were introduced to the island by the Republic of Venice to inflict damage on the Republic of Ragusa. When a male jackal appeared on Premuda in 1929, the islanders believed that it was brought to the island "out of a sheer malice". Although this population was initially synonymised with what was once thought to be the North African golden jackal (now recognised as the African Golden wolf), this origin for Dalmatian jackals was later proved unlikely, as their skulls bear less similarities to those canines from North Africa and Ethiopia, than those of the jackals from neighbouring Bosnia or Anatolia. Sir William Jardine thought that jackals were first transported to Europe through the Muslim conquests. However, the fossil record indicates that the golden jackal likely colonised the European continent from Asia during the Upper Holocene or late Pleistocene.

In 2015, during an attempt to understand the genetic identity of the rapidly expanding jackal populations in Europe, an international team of researchers examined 15 microsatellite markers and a 406 base-pair fragment of the mtDNA control region from the tissue samples of 97 specimens throughout Europe and Asia Minor. The results showed that jackals from Europe have much lower haplotype diversity than those in Israel (where they have admixed with dogs, grey wolves and African wolves), and that they mostly descend from populations originating from the Caucasus. The highest level of haplotype diversity was found in Peloponnesian jackals, which may represent another relict population of Europe's original golden jackals prior to their extirpation elsewhere. Particular attention was paid to the genetics of Baltic jackals, as all Baltic states class the animal as an introduced species, and subject to hunting. It was found that jackals in Estonia originate from the south-eastern European population, whereas those in Lithuania are of Caucasian origin; this was concluded to render the hypothesis of an artificial introduction unlikely, and that their presence in both states was consistent with the natural northward expansion of both southeastern and eastern European populations.

Surveys taken in the High Adriatic hinterland indicate that the totality of people with first hand experience of jackals (hunters, game keepers and local people) regularly mistook red foxes affected by sarcoptic mange (or in a problematic state of moult) for golden jackals. The sighting of a true golden jackal, however, was always referred to as a wolf, or a little wolf. This was verified both with photo-trapping sessions and with track studies, confirming previous observations on this matter. This erroneous and controversial perception of the golden jackal may be due to the fact that its presence is still not traditional, neither in Italian and Slovenian human culture, nor in hunting and game keeping traditions. Another difficulty for trackers is that, unlike a wolf, which defecates in the middle of trails, golden jackals leave their scat under cover of bushes.
