= List of leeches of the Czech Republic =

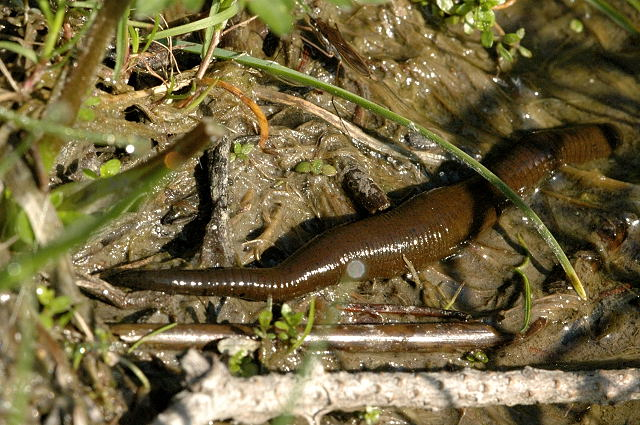
Haemopis sanguisuga

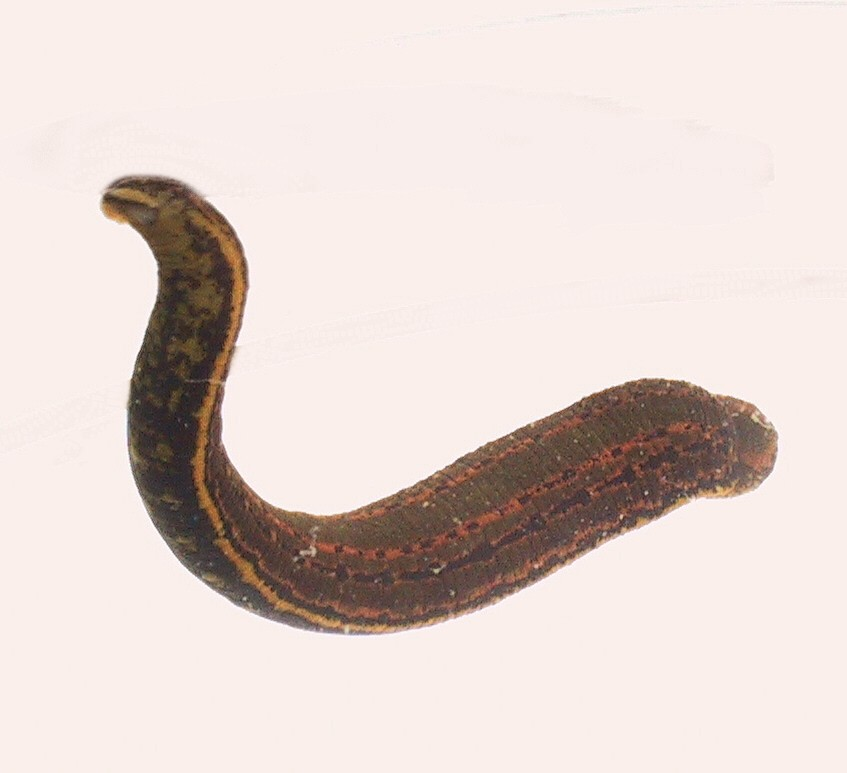
Hirudo medicinalis

There are 20 species of leeches living in the wild in the Czech Republic.

19 species were recorded in Moravia.

== Species ==
Erpobdelliformes
Erpobdellidae

- Erpobdella lineata (O. F. Müller, 1774)
- Erpobdella nigricollis (Brandes, 1900)
- Erpobdella octoculata (Linnaeus, 1758)
- Erpobdella testacea (Savigny, 1822)
- Erpobdella vilnensis Liskiewicz, 1927
- Erpobdella bykowskii Gedroyc, 1913

Hirudiniformes
Hirudinidae

- Haemopis sanguisuga (Linnaeus, 1758)
- Hirudo medicinalis Linnaeus, 1758

Rhynchobdellida
Glossiphoniidae

- Batracobdella paludosa (Carena, 1824)
- Glossiphonia complanata (Linnaeus, 1758)
- Glossiphonia concolor (Apathy, 1888)
- Glossiphonia heteroclita (Linnaeus, 1761)
- Glossiphonia nebulosa (Kalbe, 1964)
- Glossiphonia slovaca (Košel, 1972)
- Helobdella stagnalis (Linnaeus, 1758)
- Hemiclepsis marginata (O. F. Müller, 1774)
- Theromyzon tessulatum (O. F. Müller, 1774)

Piscicolidae

- Piscicola geometra (Linnaeus, 1758)
- Caspiobdella fadejewi (Epstein, 1961)

== See also ==
- Fauna of the Czech Republic
