= Dina lineata =

Scientific classification
- Kingdom: Animalia
- Phylum: Annelida
- Clade: Pleistoannelida
- Clade: Sedentaria
- Class: Clitellata
- Subclass: Hirudinea
- Order: Arhynchobdellida
- Family: Erpobdellidae
- Genus: Dina
- Species: D. lineata

Binomial name
- Dina lineata (O. F. Müller, 1774)

Synonyms
- Erpobdella lineata O. F. Müller, 1774

Species of annelid

Dina lineata is a species of leech found in Europe. These leeches show a preference for calcic waters and have a tolerance to pollution. They have a digestive tract that consists of mouth, pharynx, esophagus, six-chambered stomach, three-chambered intestine, rectum, and an anus. Its nervous system contains 21 pairs of cell compartments.

== See also ==
- List of leeches of the Czech Republic
