= Urban planning in the Czech Republic =

Urban planning in the Czech Republic has a long history, however can be broadly categorised into the time periods before, during and after the Czechoslovak Socialist Republic between 1948 and 1989.

== Early planning (pre-1948) ==
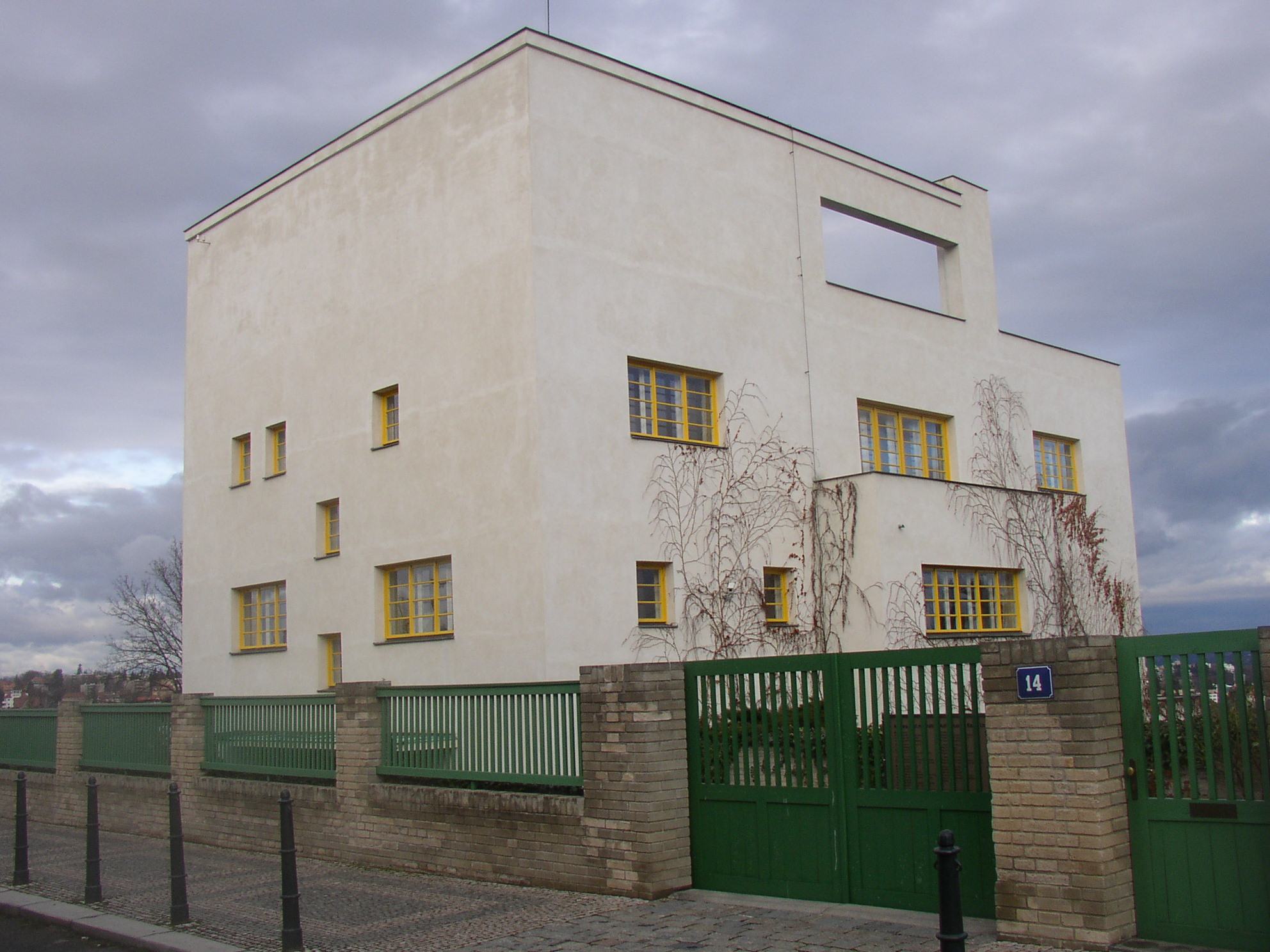
Villa Muller House in Střešovice

The 1886/1889 Bohemian Building Order required that geographic plans were to be submitted to municipalities before development. By the late 19th century, the central area of Prague remained largely untouched compared to other European cities, apart from some Haussmann-style redevelopment of the city walls and parts of Josefov. Following World War I and prior to World War II, The First Czechoslovak Republic, under the leadership of president Tomáš Garrigue Masaryk, underwent a period of significant free democratic, industrial and social advances, and Czechoslovakia ranked 10th in the world in industrial output. This period produced some good examples of progressive planning and architectural ideas, most notably examples of the Garden City theory at Sporilov and Střešovice, and of Cubist and Constructivist architecture domestic architecture at Baba and Podolí, demonstrating Czechoslovakia’s interested in promoting its free, democratic culture through planning.

== Socialist planning (1948–1989) ==
=== Planning agendas of the socialist government ===
Under the socialist government, physical planning became a tool for maintaining the system of repression and meeting the demands of the communist regime. Urban planning was a ‘top down’ process, almost completely administered by the national government according to national economic goals and objectives which rigidly determined the amount of services needed in each neighbourhood. Local municipalities lost autonomy, had no budgets apart from national allocations, and were restricted to simply placing the national projects in their area. The physical and spatial planning and investment under central government focused mainly on construction of grand schemes, (often energy and mineral resources, chemical manufacturing and heavy industries) and not on, small scale ‘consumer’ needs, or protecting the local environment. During the first years of communism in Czechoslovakia, virtually all property was nationalized and the state took control of all maintenance.

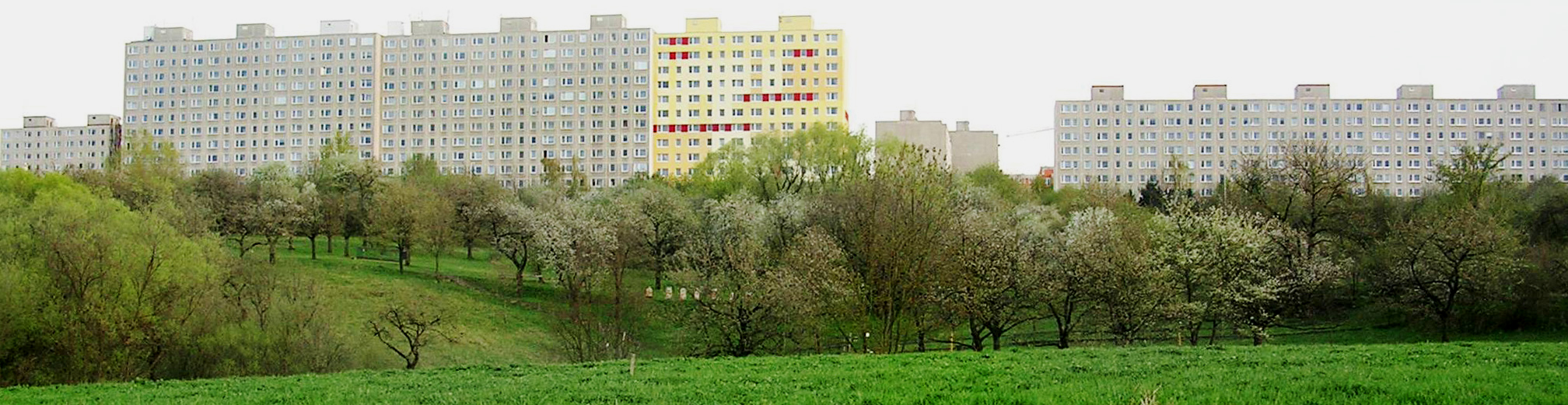
Panelák houses in Prague-Hostivař

=== Housing estates and equality ===
Despite the nationalization of all property and maintenance in the first decade of communist rule, little investment was made in new development or urban improvements, and by the 1960s; Czech cities experienced a severe housing shortage, and declining quality of buildings and sanitary conditions. This combined with a sense of insecurity within the government around the time of the Prague Spring. In response, the central government embarked on a large construction scheme, in which it built new, extensive residential areas in the form of prefabricated concrete, high-rise ‘New Towns’, which now ring the peripheries of many Czech cities and towns, colloquially known as Panelák.

Communist planners succeeded at accommodating nearly every Czechoslovak family in a dwelling with hot water, central heating, private bath, toilet, and kitchen. Large construction firms turned out massive quantities of concrete modular units in a handful of shapes that were fit together to form gray blocks of high-rise apartment buildings. A young couple with one child could expect to obtain an apartment of only approximately 250 square feet, including living room, two small bedrooms, kitchen, and bath.

— Rubenstein & Unger,1992.

The waiting time to get a state-owned apartment was often over ten years in some cities, with preference given to some groups like politicians, police and army, while other Panelák were devoted to large factories to house their workers. Shopping options within these developments were quite limited as estates were often built without retail outlets. While modular, blocky and quite impersonal, a very mixed social composition was housed within these estates, in keeping with socialist values of equality and classlessness. In 1992 even in the biggest and most desolate mass housing schemes, university professors could be found living next to bus drivers.

=== State-led industry and environmental concerns ===
A fundamental planning goal in Communist Czechoslovakia was state investment in large manufacturing enterprises . Factories led to the degradation the environmental conditions, mostly in the form of soil contamination, and in Prague, air pollution in the confined valleys became a problem for many years. The tenement Panelák houses were often built at high densities close to the source of this pollution.

=== Heritage buildings ===
There was a contradictory attitude of the communist party toward the protection of urban heritage, which was at once both a symbol of individualistic wealth and an expression of man’s triumph over nature. This led to a general neglect, inertia and gradual deterioration of many historical monuments and buildings in the country, but is widely attributed as the reason the Czech Republic has been able to retain and accumulate so many historical landmarks today.

== Post-socialist planning (post-1989) ==
=== Immediate changes – private ownership ===
Following the Velvet Revolution of 1989, all rigid state planning controls disappeared, and a key change was the transfer of all property from state to private ownership through the process of restitution. Property and small businesses like restaurants or grocery stores claimed during the communist period was given back to previous owners or their descendants, if adequate identification within a six-month period in late 1990 and early 1991 could be provided. Total ownership of state owned housing stock was relinquished in 1991, leading to the quick emergence of a private rental sector to benefit from the housing surplus. The over-supply of housing was evident in Olomouc, where 20 000 Soviet soldiers were stationed and officers and families lived in high-rise apartments. After the fall of communism, the soldiers left and completely stripped bare the apartments. The number of dwellings per 1,000 inhabitants in Czechoslovakia was higher than in some advanced countries. Planning for industry and brownfield development was largely put on hold, while new government focused on selling the firms to private investors. During this process, the problems of previous pollution by industry became widely known and new owners became concerned about contamination from former state companies.

=== Devolved government and no strategic coordination ===
After the fall of communism in 1989, there was immediate and wide support for a more local, devolved reform of government in Eastern Europe, and Czechoslovakia followed this model. Municipalities of varying sizes formed, and today Prague comprises 57 boroughs that make autonomous decisions about urban planning, policy and city-management. While there is growing use of strategic planning in boroughs, the fragmentation and uneven size of each borough makes citywide policy coordination (in the form of master plans or frameworks) difficult. Currently, planning is often left to experts, with some possibilities for participation, although national and citywide conservation bodies do not currently contribute significantly to policy making.

=== Social concerns of new urban planning ===
The privatization of houses created the first private landlords who held around 6-7 per cent of the housing stock in the Czech Republic, and inadvertently segmented the Czech rental market into ‘privileged’ and ‘non-privileged’ parts. Under capitalism, many people continued to work their normal jobs, but earned salaries much higher or lower than before. Social exclusion has the potential to occur in larger cities like Prague, as inner-city areas are gentrified for foreigners or wealthy middle class Czechs, and other areas with working-class households are left dilapidated. For example, in Hrušov, a part of Ostrava, income disparity increases socio-spatial differentiation, with residents needing to alter their livelihoods in response to their position in the shrinking city.

=== Free-market effects ===
Today, the Czech Republic operates under a capitalist market economy, increasing demand for private investment in the form of new developments. The post-communist government hopes that these new economic forces do not destroy the old-city fabric, but will instead provide funds to secure restoration and enhancement. This is proving difficult, as national or international companies often show little interest in local issues .

==== Tourism ====
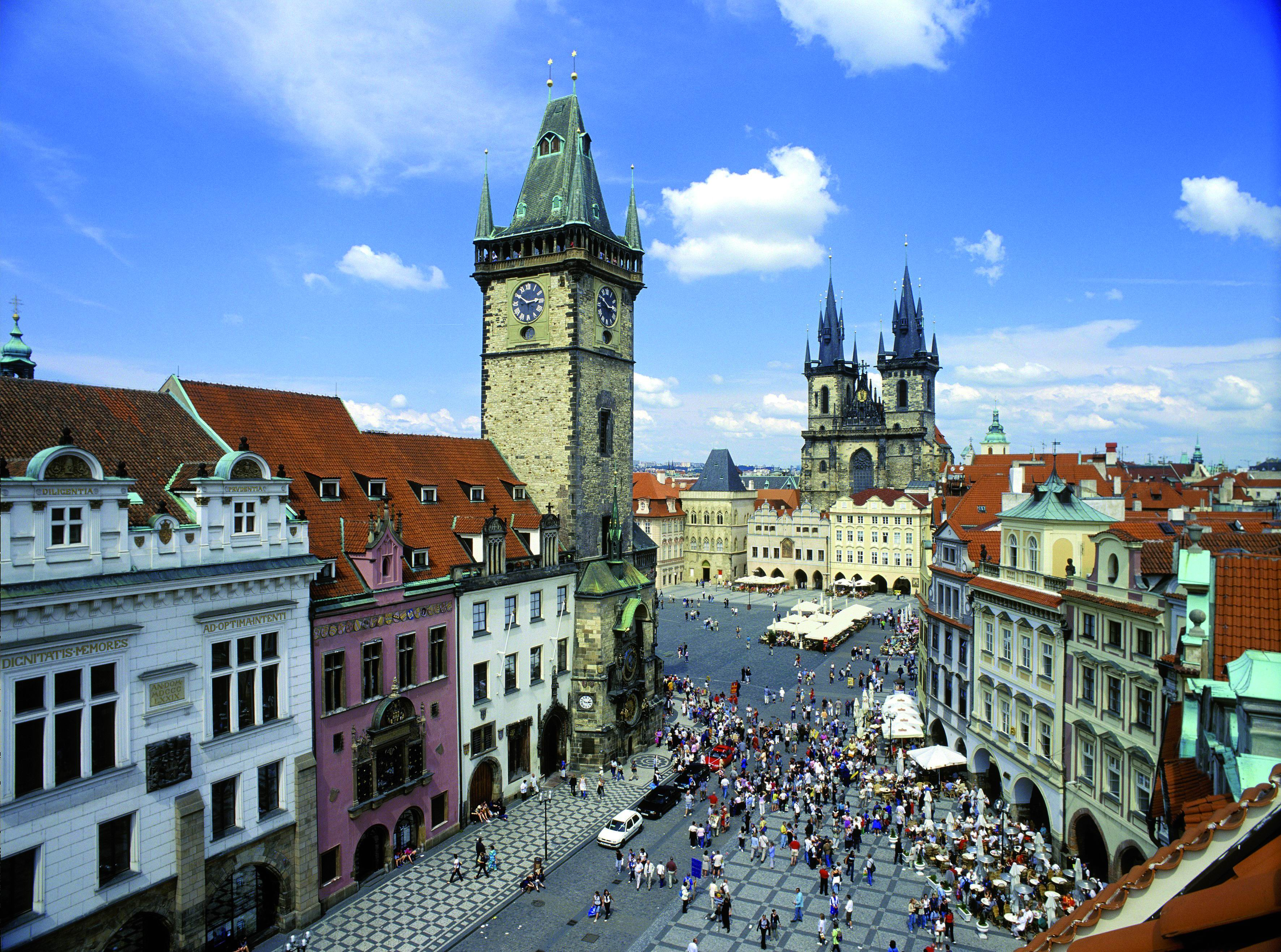
Prague's Old Town Square, a centre for tourism in the city

Tourism rose to become a key industry in the Czech Republic’s economic recovery during the 1990s, with up to 300 000 tourists visiting Prague each day. Tourism infrastructure is evident in, and has begun to reshape the centre of Prague’s historical city, as residential zones are converting to commercial use to service the tourist trade.

The symbols of a tourist city are manifest in Prague, with Versace, Benetton, Marks and Spencer and Burger King, all totems of more homogenised brands of tourist accoutrement, adorning the city centre.

— Cooper & Morpeth, 1998.

A delicate balance between transforming the urban form for tourism and preserving the heritage sections of the city now exists, because such complete, preserved historical architecture and monuments are the reason many tourists are attracted to Prague in the first place. This is recognised by the city’s current master plan, which explicitly refers to this balance, and points to other heritage sites outside the centre of Prague to ease the tension on the centre.

==== Motorisation and the mall ====
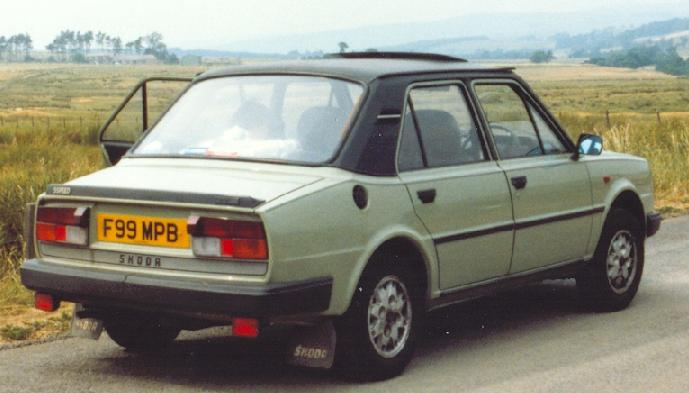
A Škoda 130, available around the time of motorisation

Similarly, the rate of motorisation rose rapidly after the Velvet Revolution, with the number of privately owned cars per thousand people jumping 77% from 276 to 489 between 1990 and 1996. As a result, the previous lack of planning for western style car usage is now a problem for local governments. Due to this rise in car use and a shift in retail market demand, developers began constructing large shopping malls at a rapid pace, usually on the city’s outskirts, with the first mall opening in 1997. Malls pose another challenge for current urban planning, as people shop less often, but for longer periods and are less likely to walk to the shops, however are not re-locating closer to the shopping malls.

=== Scepticism of planning ===
There is a significant cultural reluctance of many Czech people to accept or trust urban planning, as it is often associated with memories of the past over-controlling communist regime. Often, planning is seen as contradictory to the fundamental goal of a building a market economy without public intervention. This could be attributed to the technical kinds of statutory planning which are currently in use. Despite the criticism, urban planning is still necessary even in the Market economy of the current day Czech Republic in order to reverse years of environmental neglect of the former communist government.
