= List of herpetofauna of the Czech Republic =

== Amphibian ==
- Phylum: Chordata
- Class: Amphibia

Amphibians are tetrapod animals from the class Amphibia comprising toads, frogs, salamanders, newts and caecilians. They have an amphibious lifestyle, where the larvae are aquatic. Skin is generally soft and with glands. They show three type of respiration through moist skin, buccal cavity and lungs. Caecilians are limbless amphibians, whereas other amphibians have short limbs. Amphibians lay cluster of eggs as egg masses closer to a water body and show an external fertilization.

About 20 species of amphibians are found in Czech Republic. The low numbers is due to cold climate, where both amphibians and reptiles are poikilothermic animals they cannot survive in very cold environments. This is a list of amphibians and reptiles found in Czech Republic.

=== Order: Caudata - Salamanders and allies ===
==== Family: Salamandridae - True salamanders & Newts ====
Name	Binomial	Status
Palmate newt	Lissotriton helveticus	Least Concern
Carpathian newt	Lissotriton montandoni	Least Concern
Smooth newt	Lissotriton vulgaris	Least Concern
Alpine newt	Ichthyosaura alpestris	Least Concern
Fire salamander	Salamandra salamandra	Least Concern
Italian crested newt	Triturus carnifex	Least Concern
Northern crested newt	Triturus cristatus	Least Concern
Danube crested newt	Triturus dobrogicus	Near Threatened

=== Order: Anura - Frogs and toads ===
==== Family: Bombinatoridae - Fire-bellied toads ====
Name	Binomial	Status
European fire-bellied toad	Bombina bombina	Least Concern
Yellow-bellied toad	Bombina variegata	Least Concern

==== Family: Bufonidae - Tree toads ====
Name	Binomial	Status
Common toad	Bufo bufo	Least Concern
European green toad	Bufo viridis	Least Concern
Natterjack toad	Epidalea calamita	Least Concern

==== Family: Hylidae - Tree frogs ====
Name	Binomial	Status
European tree frog	Hyla arborea	Least Concern

==== Family: Pelobatidae - Spadefoot toads ====
Name	Binomial	Status
European common spadefoot	Pelobates fuscus	Least Concern

==== Family: Ranidae - True frogs ====
Name	Binomial	Status
Marsh frog	Pelophylax ridibundus	Least Concern
Edible frog	Pelophylax kl. esculentus	Least Concern
Pool frog	Pelophylax lessonae	Least Concern
Moor frog	Rana arvalis	Least Concern
Agile frog	Rana dalmatina	Least Concern
European grass frog	Rana temporaria	Least Concern

== Reptile ==
- Phylum: Chordata
- Class: Reptilia

Reptiles are tetrapod animals from the class Reptilia comprising today's turtles, crocodilians, snakes, amphisbaenians, lizards, tuatara, and their extinct relatives. Reptiles are vertebrates, creatures that either have four limbs or, like snakes, are descended from four-limbed ancestors. Unlike amphibians, reptiles do not have an aquatic larval stage. Most reptiles are oviparous, although several species of squamates are viviparous, as were some extinct aquatic clades — the fetus develops within the mother, contained in a placenta rather than an eggshell. As amniotes, reptile eggs are surrounded by membranes for protection and transport, which adapt them to reproduction on dry land.

There are about 16 species of reptiles found in Czech republic. The only venomous snake is the European adder.

=== Order: Testudines - Turtles ===
==== Family: Emydidae - Terrapins ====
Name	Binomial	Status
European pond turtle	Emys orbicularis	Near Threatened
Pond slider	Trachemys scripta	Least Concern (Introduced)

=== Order: Squamata - Scaled reptiles ===
==== Family: Anguidae ====
Name	Binomial	Status
Eastern slowworm	Anguis colchica	Least Concern
Common slowworm	Anguis fragilis	Least Concern

==== Family: Lacertidae - True lizards ====
Name	Binomial	Status
Sand lizard	Lacerta agilis	Least Concern
European green lizard	Lacerta viridis	Least Concern
Common wall lizard	Podarcis muralis	Least Concern
Viviparous lizard	Zootoca vivipara	Least Concern

==== Family: Colubridae - Colubrids ====
Name	Binomial	Status
Smooth snake	Coronella austriaca	Least Concern
Grass snake	Natrix natrix	Least Concern
Dice snake	Natrix tessellata	Least Concern
Aesculapian snake	Zamenis longissimus	Least Concern

==== Family: Viperidae - Vipers ====
Name	Binomial	Status
European adder	Vipera berus	Least Concern
