= Podolí (Uherské Hradiště District) =

- Municipality
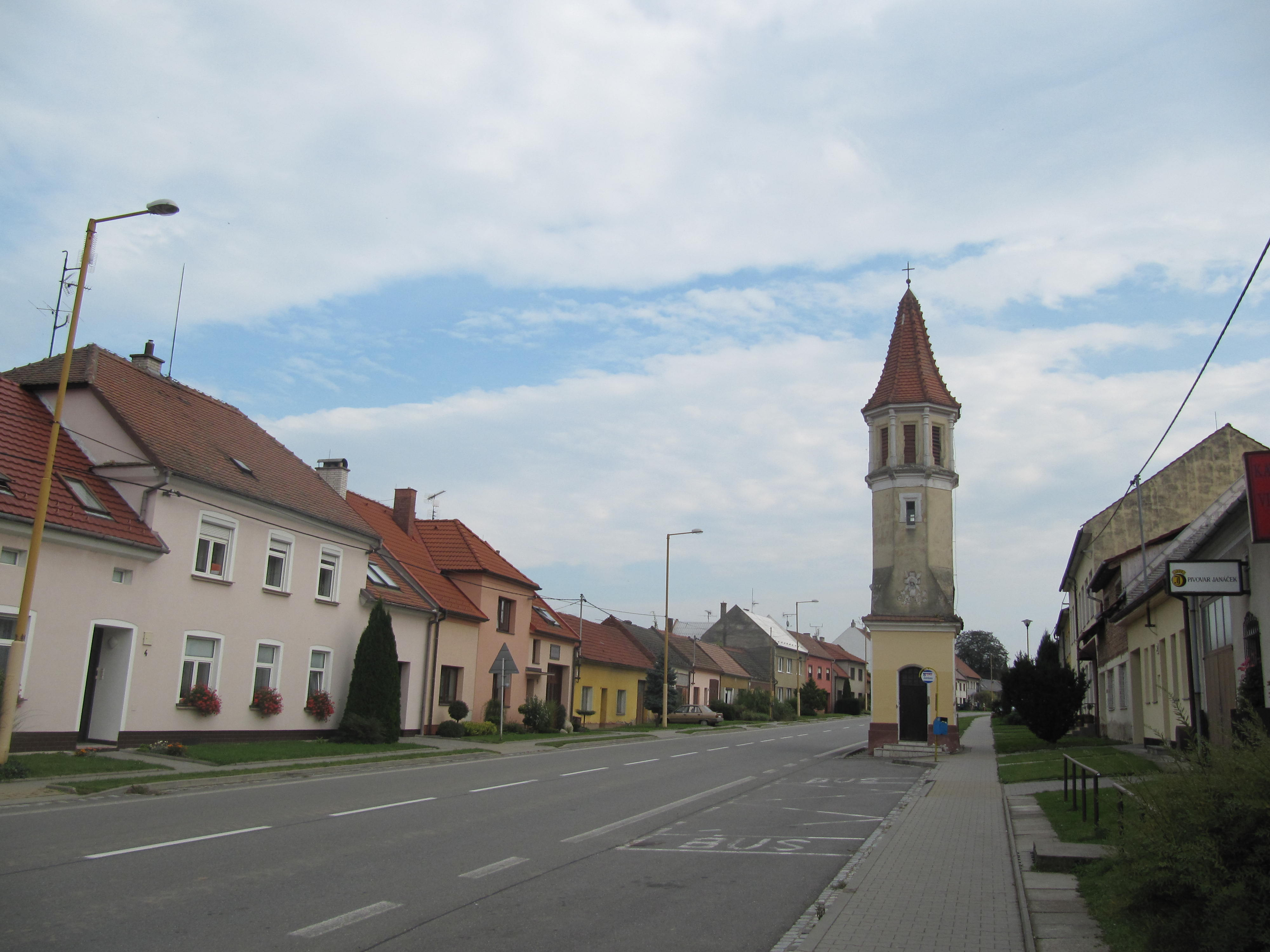
- Main street with the Chapel of Our Lady of Rosary

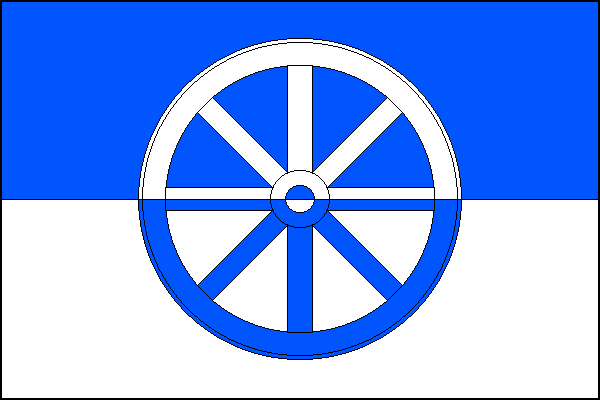
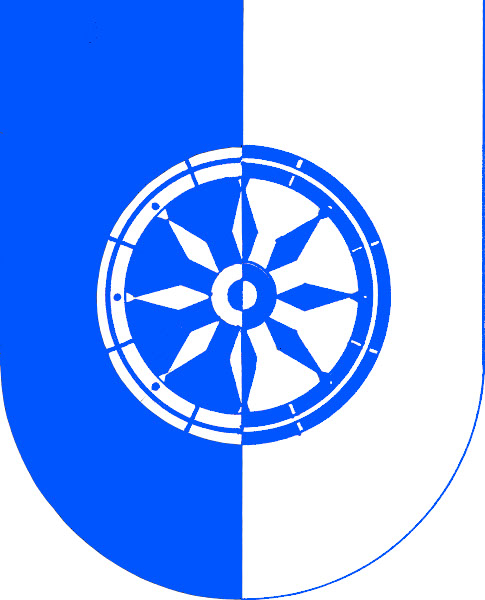
- Flag Coat of arms

- Location in the Czech Republic
- Coordinates: 49°2′27″N 17°31′46″E
- Country: Czech Republic
- Region: Zlín
- District: Uherské Hradiště
- First mentioned: 1257

Area
  - Total: 6.01 km^{2} (2.32 sq mi)
- Elevation: 199 m (653 ft)

Population (2026-01-01)
  - Total: 879
  - Density: 146/km^{2} (379/sq mi)
- Time zone: UTC+1 (CET)
  - Summer (DST): UTC+2 (CEST)
- Postal code: 686 04
- Website: www.obecpodoli.cz

Podolí is a municipality and village in Uherské Hradiště District in the Zlín Region of the Czech Republic. It has about 900 inhabitants.

Podolí lies approximately 6 kilometres (4 mi) south-east of Uherské Hradiště, 24 km (15 mi) south-west of Zlín, and 253 km (157 mi) south-east of Prague.

== Demographics ==
Historical population
Year	Pop.	±%
1869	472	—
1880	549	+16.3%
1890	540	−1.6%
1900	614	+13.7%
1910	622	+1.3%
1921	700	+12.5%
1930	704	+0.6%
1950	821	+16.6%
1961	907	+10.5%
1970	857	−5.5%
1980	790	−7.8%
1991	746	−5.6%
2001	768	+2.9%
2011	820	+6.8%
2021	851	+3.8%
Source: Censuses
