= Motobdella montezuma =

Conservation status
- Critically Imperiled (NatureServe)

Scientific classification
- Kingdom: Animalia
- Phylum: Annelida
- Clade: Pleistoannelida
- Clade: Sedentaria
- Class: Clitellata
- Subclass: Hirudinea
- Order: Arhynchobdellida
- Family: Erpobdellidae
- Genus: Motobdella
- Species: M. montezuma

Binomial name
- Motobdella montezuma (Davies, Singhal & Blinn, 1985)

Synonyms
- Erpobdella montezuma Davies, Singhal & Blinn, 1985

Species of annelid worm

Motobdella montezuma is a species of leech which is only found in Montezuma Well, central Arizona, United States. It is a nocturnal pelagic predator that feeds almost exclusively on the endemic amphipod Hyalella montezuma, which it detects using passive sonar and swallows whole.

== Description ==
Adults of M. montezuma may reach a length of 71 mm (2.8 in) including the suckers at the front and rear.

== Distribution ==
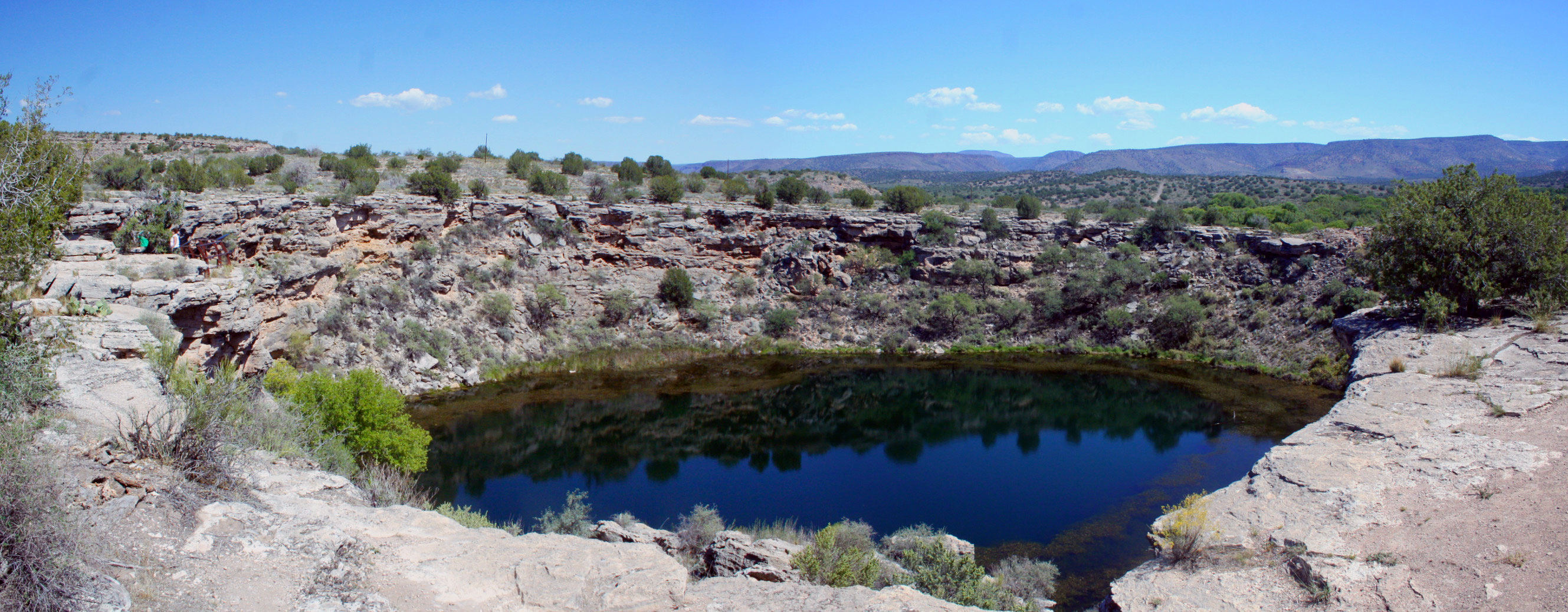
Montezuma Well

Motobdella montezuma is closely related to the genus Erpobdella, which includes species that are widespread across North America from Alaska to Mexico. However, M. montezuma is only known to occur in a single pool, Montezuma Well, in the Montezuma Castle National Monument in Yavapai County, Arizona.

== Ecology ==
Montezuma Well, due to a high carbon dioxide level in the water, is unable to support a population of fish, leaving an ecological niche of predator-free open water. Although there are a number of species of invertebrates living in the well, the diet of M. montezuma consists almost entirely of the endemic amphipod Hyalella montezuma.

=== Behavior ===
Motobdella montezuma is nocturnal, resting at the bottom of the well during the day, when predatory waterfowl are present. As night falls, the leeches swim towards the surface and hunt amphipods near the surface; this is the only instance of a leech hunting in open water. Prey are detected by passive sonar, and swallowed whole. This pattern of diel vertical migration by a leech is only known to occur in Montezuma Well.

== Life cycle ==
Like many other leeches, M. montezuma is hermaphroditic. Sexual reproduction results in two individuals fertilizing each other, and the resulting eggs are placed in a nutrient-filled cocoon. The cocoon is placed deep enough to avoid the attention of ducks and other predators, and the eggs hatch into self-sufficient juveniles.
