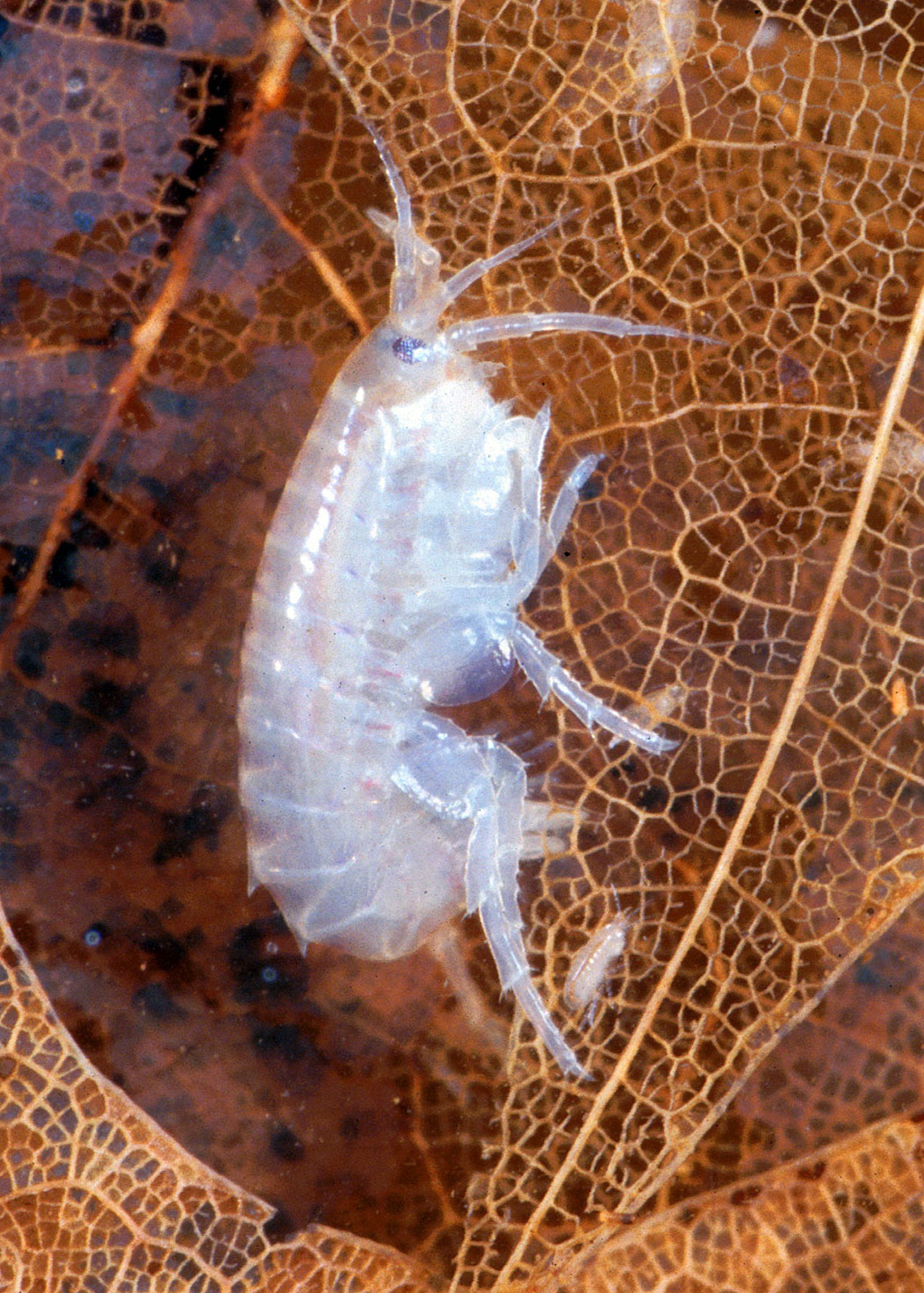

Scientific classification
- Kingdom: Animalia
- Phylum: Arthropoda
- Clade: Pancrustacea
- Class: Malacostraca
- Order: Amphipoda
- Family: Hyalellidae
- Genus: Hyalella
- Species: H. azteca

Binomial name
- Hyalella azteca (Saussure, 1858)

= Hyalella azteca =

Species of crustacean

Hyalella azteca is a widespread and abundant species complex of amphipod crustacean in North America. It reaches 3–8 mm (0.12–0.31 in) long, and is found in a range of fresh and brackish waters. It feeds on algae and diatoms and is a major food of waterfowl.

== Description ==
Hyalella azteca has body plan similar to most amphipods and is a classic freshwater example of the order. They grow to a length of 3–8 millimetres (0.12–0.31 in), with males being larger than females. Their color is variable, but the most frequent hues are white, green and brown.

They are identified from other similar species by antenna 1 being equal or shorter than antenna 2, 1 spine on pleosome 1 and pleosome 2, Pereopod I and II are gnathopod with males having a visibly larger gnathopod.

== Distribution ==
Hyalella azteca is found across Central America, the Caribbean and North America, as far north as the Arctic tree line. It lives among vegetation and sediments in permanent bodies of freshwater, including lakes and rivers, extending into tidal fresh water, and freshwater barrier lagoons. It is "the most abundant amphipod of lakes [in North America]", with golf course ponds sometimes supporting large populations.

== Ecology ==
In contrast to other species of Hyalella, H. azteca is extremely common and has wide ecological tolerances. It can tolerate alkaline waters and brackish waters, but cannot tolerate a pH lower (more acidic) than 6.0.

The main foodstuffs of H. azteca are filamentous algae and diatoms, although they may also consume organic detritus. It cannot assimilate either cellulose or lignin, even though these biomolecules are a major component of the leaf litter. It can, however, assimilate 60%–90% of the bacterial biomass that it ingests.

Hyalella azteca is an important food for many waterfowl. In Saskatchewan, 97% of the diet of female white-winged scoters was observed to be H. azteca, and it also makes up a significant part of the diet of lesser scaup.

== Insecticide resistance ==
Hyalella azteca is widely used in ecotoxicology due to its sensitivity to pollutants; however, recent studies suggest that populations may develop tolerance to insecticides over few generations. For instance, a 2024 study found that after just two generations of exposure to thiacloprid, tolerance levels increased significantly, highlighting the potential role of developmental plasticity in rapid adaptation to pesticide pollution. However, evolved resistance to insecticides may conflict with the species' ability to adapt to climate change. Fulton et al. (2021) demonstrated that some resistance mechanisms in H. azteca impose a fitness cost under higher temperatures, raising concerns about the trade-offs between pesticide tolerance and thermal adaptability in a changing environment. Some H. azteca have evolved insecticide resistance. This does however conflict with their need to adapt to climate change: Fulton et al 2021 finds some of their mechanisms of resistance impose a fitness cost under higher temperatures.

== Life cycle ==
Hyalella azteca passes through a minimum of nine instars during its development. Sexes can first be distinguished at the 6th instar, with the first mating occurring in the 8th instar. Subsequent instars, of which there may be 15–20, are considered adulthood.

== Uses ==
Hyalella azteca are used in various aquatic bioassays (also called toxicity tests). Because of their wide distribution, ease of captive reproduction, and its niche in lake sediments, Hyalella azteca are used in aquatic toxicology assays in sediments Hyalella azteca have been used to test bioaccumulation of different contaminants such as manufactured nanomaterials , pesticides , and metals .

== Taxonomic history ==
Hyalella azteca was first described by Henri Louis Frédéric de Saussure in 1858, under the name Amphitoe aztecus, based on material collected by Aztecs from a "cistern" near Veracruz, Mexico. It has also been described under several junior synonyms, including:

- Hyalella dentata S. I. Smith, 1874
- Hyalella fluvialis Lockington, 1877
- Hyalella inermis S. I. Smith, 1875
- Hyalella knickerbockeri Bate, 1862
- Hyalella ornata Pearse, 1911

When Sidney Irving Smith erected the genus Hyalella in 1874, H. azteca was the only included species, and therefore the type species. The genus now includes dozens of species, mostly in South America.

H. azteca is now thought to represent a species complex, since there is little gene flow between populations, and different morphotypes are known to coexist in some areas. Two local populations have been described as separate species – Hyalella texana from the Edwards Plateau of Texas, and Hyalella montezuma from Montezuma Well, Arizona. In addition to being a species complex, laboratory work sequencing and analyzing the genome of lab populations of Hyalella azteca revealed Hyalella azteca shares characteristics of other model organisms. [8]. How these crustaceans interact with contaminants can provide insight about how other species will interact with those same contaminants.

== Genome Sequencing Project ==
There is an ongoing Hyalella azteca genome sequencing project.

This is part of a larger project being led by the Baylor college of Medicine Human Genome Sequencing Center (BCM-HGSC); in which 28 arthropod genomes are being sequenced.

The sequencing of these genomes serves as a beginning to the larger i5k initiative, which has an end goal of sequencing 5,000 Arthropoda. Scientists looking to contribute to this research are able to nominate species to sequence, and download and share data to i5k website. Data can also be submitted to the Global Genome biodiversity workshop Biodiversity Repository.
