= Erpobdella triannulata =

Scientific classification
- Kingdom: Animalia
- Phylum: Annelida
- Clade: Pleistoannelida
- Clade: Sedentaria
- Class: Clitellata
- Subclass: Hirudinea
- Order: Arhynchobdellida
- Family: Erpobdellidae
- Genus: Erpobdella
- Species: E. triannulata

Binomial name
- Erpobdella triannulata Moore, 1908

Species of leech

Erpobdella triannulata is an leech in the Erpobdellidae family.
