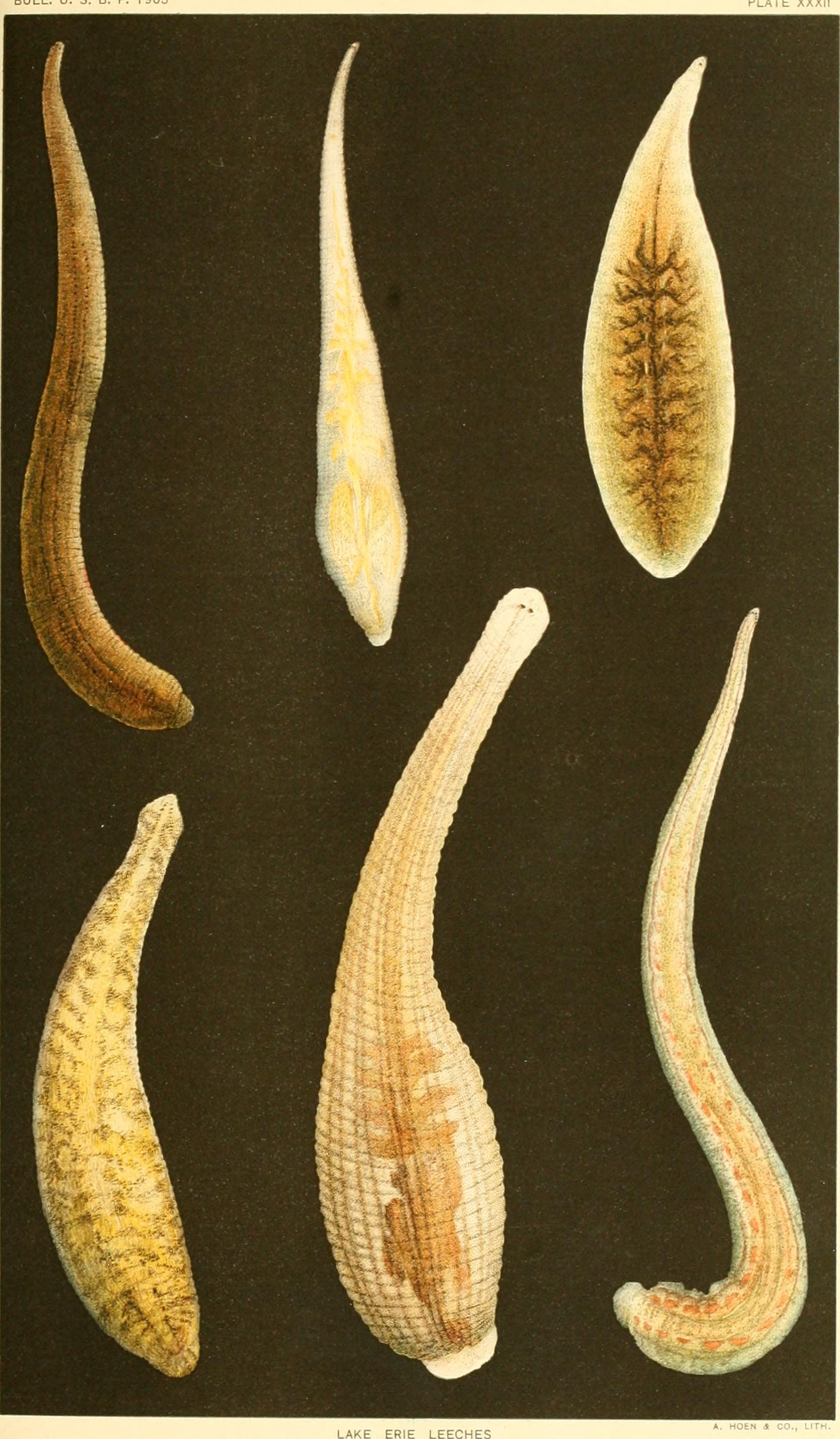

Scientific classification
- Kingdom: Animalia
- Phylum: Annelida
- Clade: Pleistoannelida
- Clade: Sedentaria
- Class: Clitellata
- Subclass: Hirudinea
- Order: Arhynchobdellida
- Family: Erpobdellidae
- Genus: Erpobdella
- Species: E. punctata

Binomial name
- Erpobdella punctata (Leidy, 1870)

= Erpobdella punctata =

Species of leech

Erpobdella punctata is a leech in the family Erpobdellidae. It is found in freshwater streams and ponds in many parts of North America.

== Distribution and habitat ==
Erpobdella punctata is a widespread species in North America. It occurs in Alaska, Canada, and much of the United States, as far south as Mexico. It occurs in both ponds and streams, and there is evidence of a notable migration upstream in the spring. However, there is a high level of mortality in some stream habitats which tend to run dry in summer.

== Ecology ==
Unlike many leeches which are blood-suckers, E. punctata is a predator and scavenger. Among the invertebrates it eats are copepods, midges, earthworms and amphipods. This leech has been observed adhering to a salamander, thus being transported to a new location as well as benefiting from any food scraps discarded by the salamander.

Erpobdella punctata is a hermaphrodite, and courtship involves two individuals stimulating each other by contact. The eggs are normally laid in May when the water temperature begins to rise. About ten cocoons are laid by each individual, each cocoon containing about five eggs. The eggs hatch in three or four weeks. Many of the cocoons fall victim to predatory snails and other leeches.

== Reproduction ==
Researchers studied this leech in two ponds in Alberta. In Cairn Pond it was the dominant leech present, while in Jail Pond it was in competition with the larger leech, Erpobdella obscura, both relying on the same resources. In Jail Pond, E. punctata adults started breeding at a smaller size, started breeding earlier in the year and continued breeding over a longer time period, exhibiting an r-selection strategy. Cairn Pond was in close proximity to Jail Pond, but here E. punctata exhibited a K-selection strategy, with an age at first breeding of either one or two years, a later start to the breeding season and a reduction in length of the annual breeding season. The differences in strategies are hypothesized as being due to the interspecific competition in Jail Pond.
