= Allorchestes compressa =

Scientific classification
- Kingdom: Animalia
- Phylum: Arthropoda
- Clade: Pancrustacea
- Class: Malacostraca
- Order: Amphipoda
- Family: Dogielinotidae
- Genus: Allorchestes
- Species: A. compressa

Binomial name
- Allorchestes compressa Dana, 1852

Species of crustacean

Allorchestes compressa is a species of amphipod in the family Dogielinotidae. It is found around the coast of Australia from Western Australia to Tasmania and east to Illawarra, New South Wales.
