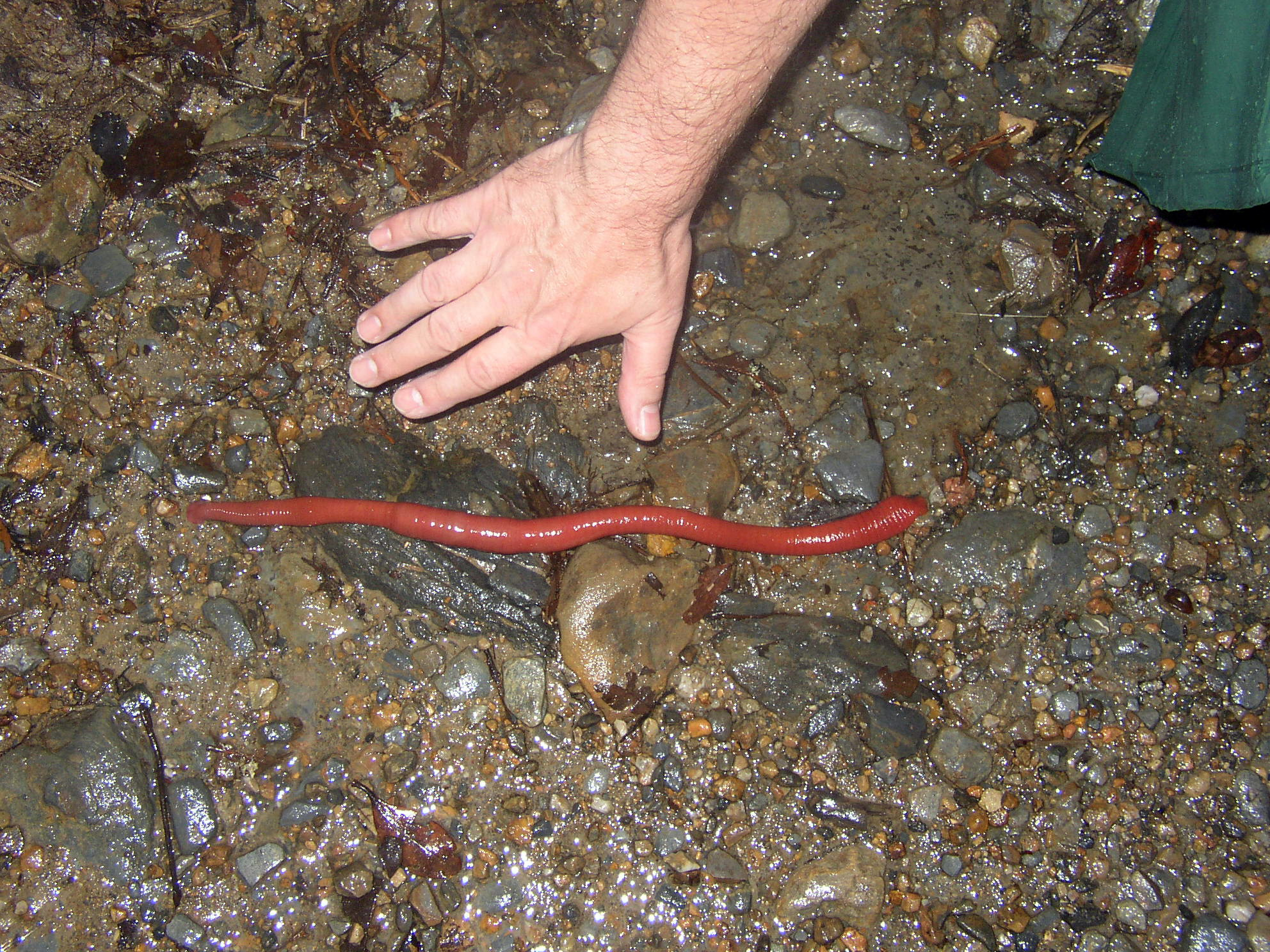
- Kinabalu giant red leech

Scientific classification
- Kingdom: Animalia
- Phylum: Annelida
- Clade: Pleistoannelida
- Clade: Sedentaria
- Class: Clitellata
- Subclass: Hirudinea
- Order: Arhynchobdellida
- Family: Salifidae
- Genus: Mimobdella
- Species: M. buettikoferi

Binomial name
- Mimobdella buettikoferi Blanchard, 1897

Synonyms
- Mimobdella Büttikoferi; Blanchard, 1897

= Kinabalu giant red leech =

Species of annelid worm

The Kinabalu giant red leech (Mimobdella buettikoferi) is a large bright orange-red coloured leech that is endemic to Mount Kinabalu, Borneo. It can grow to a length of over 50 cm (20 in).

== Etymology ==
The holotype was collected by Johann Büttikofer, and the specific name buettikoferi is derived from his surname.

== Ecology ==
The Kinabalu leech is not hematophagic and feeds only on worms such as the Kinabalu giant earthworm, Pheretima darnleiensis. It lives in the damp leaf litter and soil that often accumulates in fissures. It can be found in Kinabalu Park at an elevation of 2,500 to 3,000 metres (8,200 to 9,800 ft) where the trail runs over a rocky outcrop near to the Mempening and Paka Cave shelters. It is usually seen during or after heavy downpours.

== Taxonomy ==
Kinabalu giant red leech is currently classified under the genus Mimobdella of the family Salifidae. However Nakano (2011) has questioned its inclusion within the genus (as well as that of Mimobdella thienemani). The internal and external morphological characteristics of these two species do not fit the generic diagnostic criteria as established by the type species and the only other species in the genus, Mimobdella japonica.
