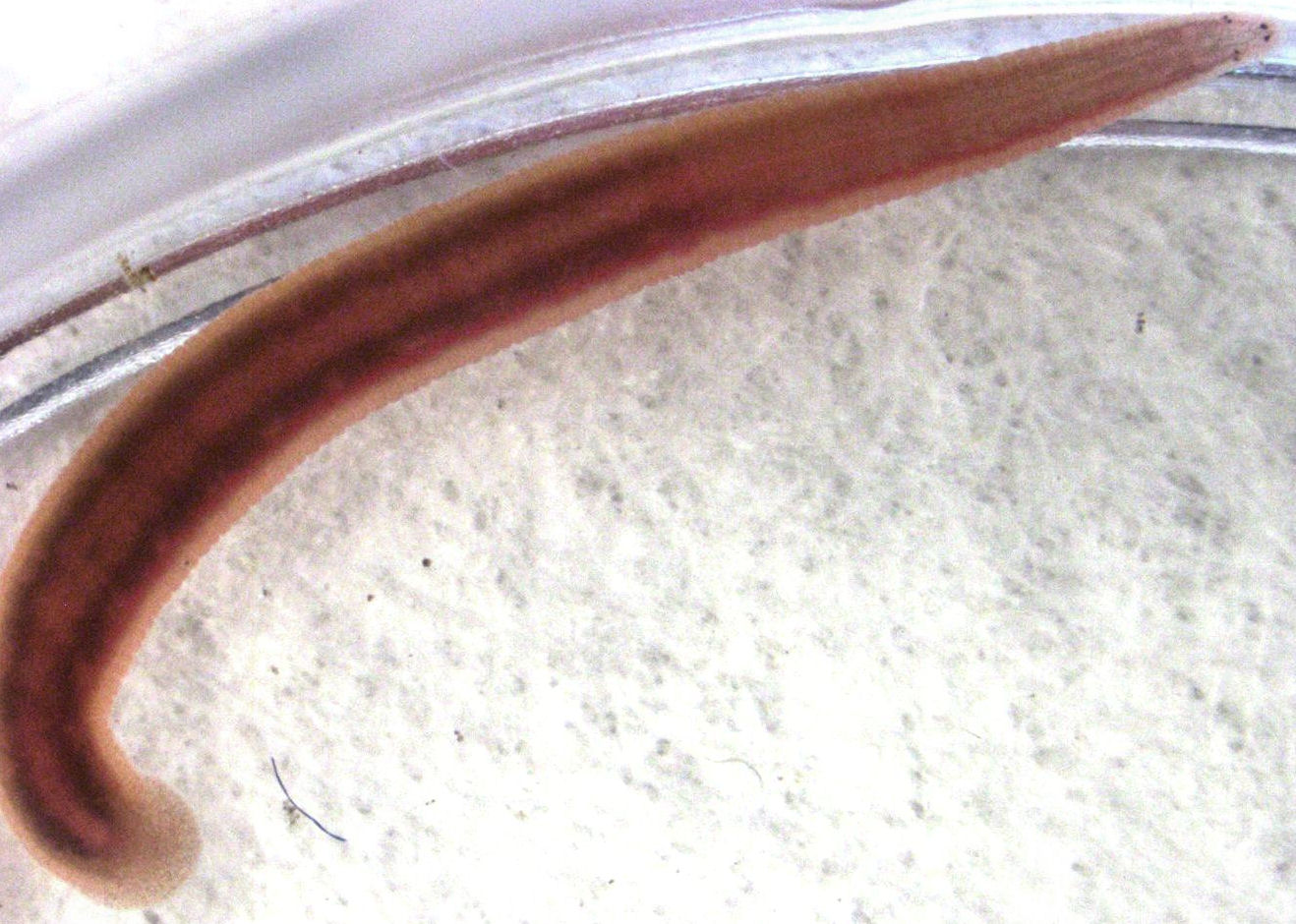

Scientific classification
- Kingdom: Animalia
- Phylum: Annelida
- Clade: Pleistoannelida
- Clade: Sedentaria
- Class: Clitellata
- Subclass: Hirudinea
- Order: Arhynchobdellida
- Family: Salifidae
- Genus: Barbronia
- Species: B. weberi

Binomial name
- Barbronia weberi (R. Blanchard, 1897)

Synonyms
- Dina weberi R. Blanchard, 1897 (original combination)

= Barbronia weberi =

Species of annelid worm

Barbronia weberi is a species of freshwater leech in the family Salifidae. It is native to southeastern Asia but has spread to other parts of the world, including Australia, South America, southern Europe and the United States.

== Description ==
Barbronia weberi grows to a body length of about 2.5 to 3 cm (1.0 to 1.2 in), with individuals becoming sexually mature from a length of about 1.4 cm (0.6 in). The body is about 1.9 mm (0.07 in) wide and the rear suction cup has a diameter of approximately 1.5 mm (0.06 in). The body surface is covered with tiny papillae and is a uniform red to dark reddish-brown colour, sometimes almost black. There are always three pairs of eyespots on the head. The segments are not externally recognizable, and the seventeen body segments each comprise five outer annulations. In the pharynx, there are one or two retractile stylets on each of the three jaws. Between the male and female sex opening of the hermaphrodite animals there are five or fewer annulations. On the ventral surface, there is a central accessory copulation pore next to the gonopores, but this is absent in young animals.

== Distribution and habitat ==
The species is native to India, southeastern Asia, the Philippines and Indonesia. From here it has spread to Australia, Europe and South America. It is a freshwater species. In 2018 it was reported from two widely separated locations in North Carolina, but it is unclear whether these are as a result of two different introductions, or mean that the leech has become widely distributed but has previously been overlooked.

== Ecology ==
As is the case with all leeches, B. weberi is a hermaphrodite; sperm is passed from one individual to another by traumatic insemination. The eggs are fertilised and a cocoon is secreted by the clitellum and receives the from one to five eggs as it passes over the female gonopore. The eggs hatch in about one month and the juvenile leeches that emerge become mature in about four months. The adult can produce weekly cocoons for about three months before becoming senescent. Adults are often found attached to water plants, and the cocoons containing eggs are attached to rocks, submerged objects or aquatic vegetation at the base of leaf whorls; it seems likely that the transport of aquatic plants by the aquarium trade is the means by which the leech has dispersed to new locations. This leech can be successfully reared egg to egg in the laboratory, and may be of use as a model organism in developmental studies.
