= Dina parva =

Scientific classification
- Kingdom: Animalia
- Phylum: Annelida
- Clade: Pleistoannelida
- Clade: Sedentaria
- Class: Clitellata
- Subclass: Hirudinea
- Order: Arhynchobdellida
- Family: Erpobdellidae
- Genus: Dina
- Species: D. parva

Binomial name
- Dina parva Moore, 1912

Synonyms
- Erpobdella parva (Moore, 1912)

Species of annelid

Dina parva is an annelid in the Erpobdellidae family.
