= Erpobdella mestrovi =

Scientific classification
- Domain: Eukaryota
- Kingdom: Animalia
- Phylum: Annelida
- Clade: Pleistoannelida
- Clade: Sedentaria
- Class: Clitellata
- Subclass: Hirudinea
- Order: Arhynchobdellida
- Family: Erpobdellidae
- Genus: Erpobdella
- Species: E. mestrovi

Binomial name
- Erpobdella mestrovi (Kerovec, Kučinić & Jalžić, 1999)

Species of leech

Erpobdella mestrovi is a species of troglobitic leech found only in deep caves in Northern Velebit, part of the Dinaric Alps of Croatia. The leech was first found in Lukina jama in 1994, which at 1431 meters deep is the deepest cave in Croatia. The leech has been found in several other caves systems in Velebit such as Slovacka jama (-1320 m), Olimp (-531 m) and Velebita (-1026 m), and is currently considered endemic to Croatia.

This leech inhabits underground streams and has several adaptations to deal with a rheophilic and troglobitic lifestyle. The leech lacks eyes, has pale skin, and strong suckers to help it move around its environment. A flat body prevents it from being swept away by the current. The leech moves in a caterpillar-like motion, alternating between its posterior and oral sucker. There are several extremities protruding from the sides that are theorized to be gills. This leech grows about 25 to 40 mm (1 to 1.6 in) in length and can handle temperatures as low as 4 to 6 °C (39.2– 42.8 °F).
