= Erpobdella obscura =

Scientific classification
- Kingdom: Animalia
- Phylum: Annelida
- Clade: Pleistoannelida
- Clade: Sedentaria
- Class: Clitellata
- Subclass: Hirudinea
- Order: Arhynchobdellida
- Family: Erpobdellidae
- Genus: Erpobdella
- Species: E. obscura

Binomial name
- Erpobdella obscura (Verrill, 1872)

Synonyms
- Nephelopsis obscura Verrill, 1872

Species of annelid

Erpobdella obscura is a freshwater ribbon leech common in North America. It is a relatively large leech and is commonly used as bait by anglers for walleye and other sport fish. In Minnesota, live bait dealers annually harvest over 45,000 kg of bait-leeches, raising concerns of over-harvest.

== Description ==
Erpobdella obscura is a large leech growing to a length of about 10 cm (4 in). The mouth is large, occupying almost the whole of the anterior sucker, but there are no jaws. The dorsal surface is irregularly marked with dark blotches but it does not have the two longitudinal rows of black spots characteristic of Erpobdella punctata, another common North American species.

== Morphology & Reproduction ==
Erpobdella obscura is a sequential hermaphrodite when it first starts reproducing. There is a short period of overlap while it changes from producing male gametes to female gametes. In its second cycle of gametogenesis, it becomes a simultaneous hermaphrodite and both sperm and eggs are produced at the same time. As in other species of leech, a cocoon is secreted by the clitellum, a thickened glandular section of the body wall behind the head, and this moves forwards over the head, receiving fertilised eggs from the gonopore on the way.

In some areas, Erpobdella obscura has a semelparous life history, i.e., the leech dies after reproduction. Generation length is from 12 to 24 months, with spring and summer generations occurring in some ponds. It is not a blood-sucking leech but is a predator on a range of other invertebrates including amphipods, water fleas, copepods, worms and gastropod molluscs.
