= Erpobdella lahontana =

Scientific classification
- Domain: Eukaryota
- Kingdom: Animalia
- Phylum: Annelida
- Clade: Pleistoannelida
- Clade: Sedentaria
- Class: Clitellata
- Subclass: Hirudinea
- Order: Arhynchobdellida
- Family: Erpobdellidae
- Genus: Erpobdella
- Species: E. lahontana

Binomial name
- Erpobdella lahontana Hovingh & Klemm, 2000

Species of leech

Erpobdella lahontana is a leech in the Erpobdellidae family.
