= Fadejewobdella =

Scientific classification
- Domain: Eukaryota
- Kingdom: Animalia
- Phylum: Annelida
- Clade: Pleistoannelida
- Clade: Sedentaria
- Class: Clitellata
- Subclass: Hirudinea
- Order: Arhynchobdellida
- Family: Erpobdellidae
- Genus: Fadejewobdella; Lukin, 1962

Genus of annelid worms

Fadejewobdella is a genus of annelids belonging to the family Erpobdellidae.

The species of this genus are found in Eastern Europe.

Species:

- Fadejewobdella quinqueannulata (Lukin, 1929)
