= Erpobdella testacea =

Scientific classification
- Kingdom: Animalia
- Phylum: Annelida
- Clade: Pleistoannelida
- Clade: Sedentaria
- Class: Clitellata
- Subclass: Hirudinea
- Order: Arhynchobdellida
- Family: Erpobdellidae
- Genus: Erpobdella
- Species: E. testacea

Binomial name
- Erpobdella testacea (Savigny, 1822)

Species of annelid worm

Erpobdella testacea is a species of Erpobdella.

It is native to Europe.

The species was described in 1822 by Jules-César Savigny as Nephelis testacea.
