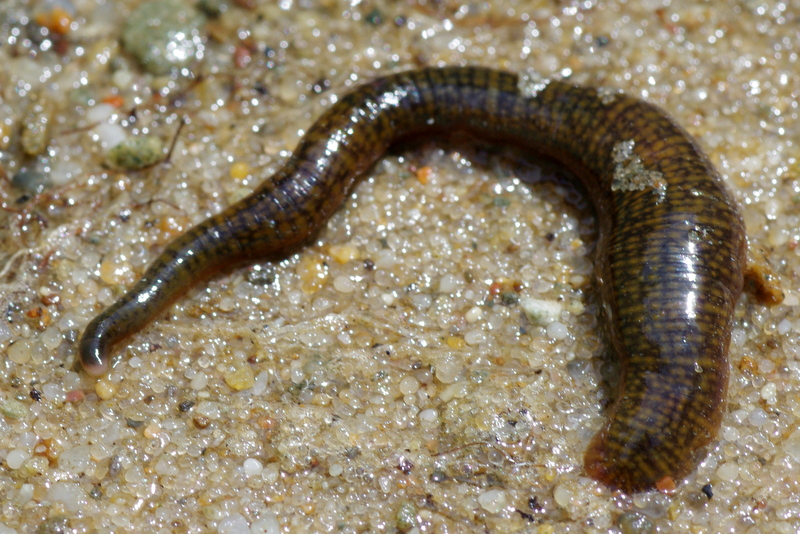

Scientific classification
- Kingdom: Animalia
- Phylum: Annelida
- Clade: Pleistoannelida
- Clade: Sedentaria
- Class: Clitellata
- Subclass: Hirudinea
- Order: Arhynchobdellida
- Family: Erpobdellidae
- Genus: Erpobdella
- Species: E. octoculata

Binomial name
- Erpobdella octoculata (Linnaeus, 1758)

= Erpobdella octoculata =

Species of leech

Erpobdella octoculata is a freshwater leech in the Erpobdellidae family. This species can be found in Europe, the Mediterranean, and the Middle East (Iran and Turkey).

== Description ==
This tube-shaped species ranges from 3–7 cm long. Like all leeches, E. octoculata has 32 fixed segments. Segments 1–4 contain the head, along with the brain, and oral sucker. The mid-body is composed of segments 5–25 where bodily organs are. The tail sucker is housed in segments 26–32.

The body color of E. octoculata ranges from yellow-green to a reddish-brown. This color depends on the amount of non-pigmented spots surrounding the sensory buds. Individuals with a higher percentage of non-pigmented spots on their dorsum appear yellow-green. Those with a higher percentage of pigment appear a reddish-brown. Body color also corresponds to different substrates at the bottoms of aqueous habitats such as stones (lighter color) or plants (darker color).

Erpobdella octoculata has 4 pairs of black eyes. The two pairs of labial eyes can occur on segments 2 or 3. The two buccal pairs of eyes are situated on segment 4. The buccal eyes are smaller, only containing three layers of photoreceptor cells, while the labial eyes have six layers.

== Habitat and distribution ==
E. octoculata is one of the most common freshwater leeches in Europe with documentation in over 20 countries. This species has been shown to be more abundant in fast moving streams and rivers with rocky bottoms than other leech species. E. octoculata prefers acidic bodies of water with low nutrient content. This species was also found to be abundant in polluted streams in Poland.

=== Use as bioindicators ===
This species of leech can be used as a bioindicator due to its ability to survive in polluted waters. Levels of contamination can also be determined by the amount of pollutants in the tissues of E. octoculata, which was shown in a study by Macova et al.

== Biology and behavior ==
=== Feeding ===
Erpobdella octoculata is a predator and exhibits scavenging behavior. It feeds primarily on chironomid larvae and oligochaetes. Due to the lack of jaws or a proboscis, this species uses a pharynx to swallow its prey whole. In a laboratory study, it was found that E. octoculata will suck in pieces of dead or wounded animals including vertebrates such as fish. In addition, when wounded chironomid larva is present, this species will uses its oral sucker to retrieve blood. Newly hatched leeches feed on insect larvae and suck the blood from injured Chironomus larvae. E. octoculata primarily hunts at night.

=== Movement ===
E. octoculata uses vermiform crawling to move across the bottoms of stony streams. Vermiform crawling involves an alternating shortening and extending of the body along the tail and oral suckers. Both suckers start off relatively distant and are attached to a stone. Then only the oral sucker lifts itself and the entire body extends before the oral sucker reattaches itself. The front of the body extends while the back shortens. Next the tail sucker lifts and the back of the body shortens. When the tail sucker attaches back to a stone or substrate, it is relatively close to the oral sucker and the body is in a scrunched c-shape. Along with vermiform crawling, E. octoculata also swims using oscillatory movements.

=== Sensory systems ===
Many leeches contain sensillae, which sense water movement and light with photoreceptors. E. octoculata lacks developed sensillae and instead has sensory buds on its dorsal surface due to its predaceous nature and fast moving aqueous environment. Spread through the center of each annulus, these sensory buds have a round, raised appearance on the dorsum of this species. These sensory buds are composed of bipolar sensory cells, which are chemoreceptive and perceive water movement. This leech does also have a brain that is a mass of ganglia.

In addition, E. octoculata also has mechanoreceptors located in its skin. They are activated by stimulation such as touch or attacks from predators. Known predators include perch, water beetles, and caddisflies.

=== Osmoregulation and excretion ===
Freshwater leeches need to constantly remove excess water along with waste products. Nephridia are organs that function similarly to kidneys. They aid in this water and waste removal and the reabsorption of salts. Nephridia occur on each segment in the mid-body.

== Reproduction and life cycle ==
The life cycle of Erpobdella octoculata lasts 1–3 years. Adult leeches are distinguished by the presence of a clitellum, where its oval shaped cocoons are secreted from. These cocoons have approximately 5–10 eggs each. Most individuals lay cocoons within 1 year of hatching and subsequently die. If an individual does not breed after 1 year, it breeds at 2 years of age and lays cocoons for a second time at 3 years old. Variations between lengths of the life cycle can potentially be explained by environmental conditions such as water temperature, food availability and dissolved oxygen.

Since Erpobdella octoculata is a hermaphrodite, it has male and female gonopores. These gonopores have openings on the dorsum.
