= Archaeobdella =

Scientific classification
- Domain: Eukaryota
- Kingdom: Animalia
- Phylum: Annelida
- Clade: Pleistoannelida
- Clade: Sedentaria
- Class: Clitellata
- Subclass: Hirudinea
- Order: Arhynchobdellida
- Family: Erpobdellidae
- Genus: Archaeobdella; Grimm, 1876

Genus of annelid worms

Archaeobdella is a genus of annelids belonging to the family Erpobdellidae.

The species of this genus are found in Europe.

Species:

- Archaeobdella esmonti Grimm, 1876
