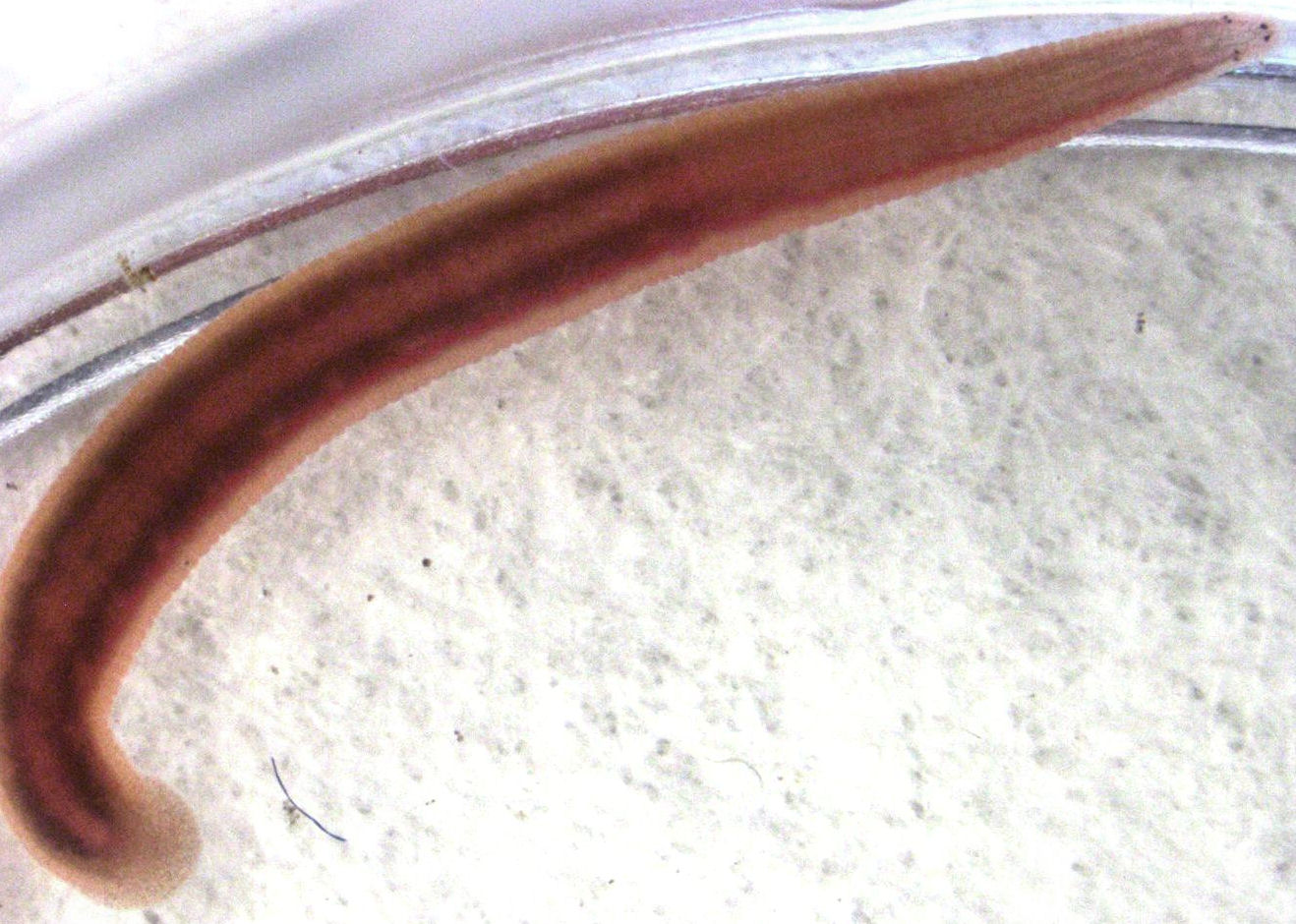

Scientific classification
- Kingdom: Animalia
- Phylum: Annelida
- Clade: Pleistoannelida
- Clade: Sedentaria
- Class: Clitellata
- Subclass: Hirudinea
- Order: Arhynchobdellida
- Family: Salifidae
- Genus: Barbronia; Johansson, 1918

= Barbronia =

Genus of annelid worms

Barbronia is a genus of annelids belonging to the family Salifidae.

The species of this genus are found in Europe and Northern America.

Species:

- Barbronia assiuti Johansson, 1918
- Barbronia delicata Moore, 1939
- Barbronia gwalagwalensis Westergren & Siddall, 2004
- Barbronia weberi R. Blanchard, 1897
