= Dina (annelid) =

Scientific classification
- Kingdom: Animalia
- Phylum: Annelida
- Clade: Pleistoannelida
- Clade: Sedentaria
- Class: Clitellata
- Subclass: Hirudinea
- Order: Arhynchobdellida
- Family: Erpobdellidae
- Genus: Dina; Blanchard, 1892

Genus of annelid worms

Dina is a genus of annelids belonging to the family Erpobdellidae.

The species of this genus are found in Europe and Western Asia.

Species:

- Dina absoloni Johansson, 1913
- Dina anoculata Moore, 1898
- Dina apathyi Gedroyc, 1916
- Dina dubia Moore & Meyer, 1951
- Dina eturpshem Sket, 1989
- Dina farsa Grosser & Pesic, 2006
- Dina krasensis (Sket, 1968)
- Dina krilata Sket, 1989
- Dina kuzmani Sapkarev, 1990
- Dina latestriata Neubert & Nesemann, 1995
- Dina lepinja Sket & Sapkarev, 1986
- Dina lineata (O.F.Müller, 1773)
- Dina parva Moore, 1912
