= Allorchestes =

Scientific classification
- Kingdom: Animalia
- Phylum: Arthropoda
- Clade: Pancrustacea
- Class: Malacostraca
- Order: Amphipoda
- Family: Dogielinotidae
- Subfamily: Dogielinotinae
- Genus: Allorchestes; Dana, 1849

Type species
- Allorchestes compressa Dana, 1852

Genus of crustaceans

Allorchestes is a genus of amphipods with relatively small gnathopods, in the family Dogielinotidae; it contains the following species:

- Allorchestes angusta Dana, 1856
- Allorchestes bellabella J. L. Barnard, 1974
- Allorchestes carinata Iwasa, 1939
- Allorchestes compressa Dana, 1852
- Allorchestes hirsutus Ishimaru, 1995
- Allorchestes inquirendus K. H. Barnard, 1940
- Allorchestes malleola Stebbing, 1899
- Allorchestes novizealandiae Dana, 1852
- Allorchestes priceae Hendrycks & Bousfield, 2001
- Allorchestes rickeri Hendrycks & Bousfield, 2001
