= Hyalella montezuma =

Conservation status
- Critically Imperiled (NatureServe)

Scientific classification
- Kingdom: Animalia
- Phylum: Arthropoda
- Class: Malacostraca
- Order: Amphipoda
- Family: Hyalellidae
- Genus: Hyalella
- Species: H. montezuma

Binomial name
- Hyalella montezuma Cole & Watkins, 1977

Species of crustacean

Hyalella montezuma is a pelagic amphipod. It lives in Montezuma Well, an oasis in central Arizona. It is the only food of the endemic leech Motobdella montezuma.
