= Motobdella =

Scientific classification
- Kingdom: Animalia
- Phylum: Annelida
- Clade: Pleistoannelida
- Clade: Sedentaria
- Class: Clitellata
- Subclass: Hirudinea
- Order: Arhynchobdellida
- Family: Erpobdellidae
- Genus: Motobdella; Govedich, Blinn, Keim & Davies, 1998

Type species
- Erpobdella montezuma Davies, Singhal, and Blinn, 1985

Species
- See text

Genus of annelids

Motobdella is a genus of leeches in the family Erpobdellidae. It contains two species:

- Motobdella montezuma (Davies, Singhal, and Blinn, 1985)
- Motobdella sedonensis Govedich, Blinn, Keim & Davies, 1998
