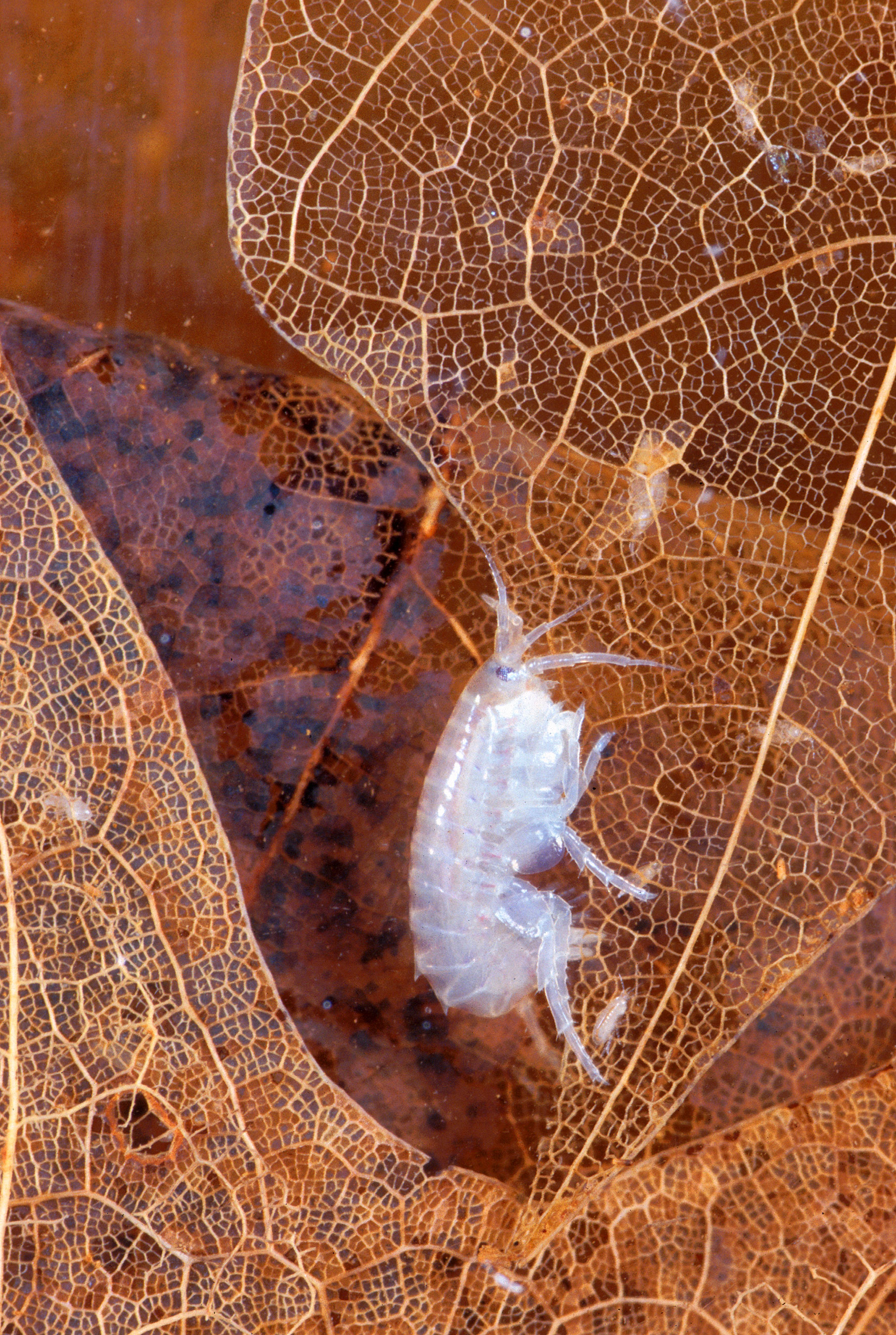
- Hyalella azteca

Scientific classification
- Kingdom: Animalia
- Phylum: Arthropoda
- Class: Malacostraca
- Order: Amphipoda
- Family: Hyalellidae
- Genus: Hyalella; S. I. Smith, 1874

= Hyalella =

Genus of crustaceans

Hyalella is a genus of amphipods found in the Americas. They are mainly found in freshwater habitats.

== Species ==
The following species are recognised in the genus Hyalella:

- Hyalella anophthalma Ruffo, 1957
- Hyalella araucana Grosso & Peralta, 1999
- Hyalella armata (Faxon, 1876)
- Hyalella azteca (Saussure, 1858)
- Hyalella bonariensis Bond-Buckup, Araujo & Santos, 2008
- Hyalella brasiliensis Bousfield, 1996
- Hyalella caeca Pereira, 1989
- Hyalella cajasi Alonso & Jaume, 2017
- Hyalella caribbeana Bousfield, 1996
- Hyalella carstica Bastos-Pereira & Bueno, 2012
- Hyalella castroi Gonzalez, Bond-Buckup & Araujo, 2006
- Hyalella catarinensis Reis & Bueno in Reis, Penoni & Bueno, 2020
- Hyalella cenotensis Marrón-Becerra, Hermoso-Salazar & Solís-Weiss, 2014
- Hyalella cheyennis Bueno, Oliveira & Wellborn, 2019
- Hyalella chiloensis Gonzalez & Watling, 2001
- Hyalella costera Gonzalez & Watling, 2001
- Hyalella crawfordi Coleman & Gonzalez, 2006
- Hyalella cuprea (Faxon, 1876)
- Hyalella curvispina Shoemaker, 1942
- Hyalella dielaii Pereira, 2004
- Hyalella dybowskii (Wrześniowski, 1879)
- Hyalella echinus (Faxon, 1876)
- Hyalella epikarstica Rodrigues, Bueno & Ferreira, 2014
- Hyalella falklandensis Bousfield, 1996
- Hyalella faxoni Stebbing, 1903
- Hyalella formosa Cardoso & Bueno, 2014
- Hyalella fossamancinii Cavalieri, 1959
- Hyalella franciscae Gonzalez & Watling, 2003
- Hyalella gauthieri Coleman & Gonzalez, 2006
- Hyalella gracilicornis (Faxon, 1876)
- Hyalella imbya Rodrigues & Bueno, 2012
- Hyalella jelskii (Wrześniowski, 1879)
- Hyalella kaingang Araújo & Cardoso in Bueno, Araujo, Cardoso, Gomes & Bond-Buckup, 2013
- Hyalella kochi Gonzalez & Watling, 2001
- Hyalella lalage Brehm-Lunz, 1925
- Hyalella latimana (Faxon, 1876)
- Hyalella longicornis Bousfield, 1996
- Hyalella longipalma (Faxon, 1876)
- Hyalella longispina Gonzalez & Coleman, 2002
- Hyalella longistila (Faxon, 1876)
- Hyalella lubomirskii (Wrześniowski, 1879)
- Hyalella lucifugax (Faxon, 1876)
- Hyalella maya Marrón-Becerra, Hermoso-Salazar & Solís-Weiss, 2018
- Hyalella meinerti Stebbing, 1899
- Hyalella meraspinosa Baldinger, 2004
- Hyalella minensis Bastos-Pereira & Bueno, 2013
- Hyalella misionensis Colla & César, 2015
- Hyalella montana Rodrigues, Senna, Quadra & Bueno, 2017
- Hyalella montenegrinae Bond-Buckup & Araujo, 1998
- Hyalella montezuma Cole & Watkins, 1977
- Hyalella montforti Chevreux, 1907
- Hyalella muerta Baldinger, Shepard & Threloff, 2000
- Hyalella neonoma Stock & Platvoet, 1991
- Hyalella neveulemairei Chevreux, 1904
- Hyalella palmeirensis Streck-Marx & Castiglioni, 2020
- Hyalella pamqeana Cavalieri, 1968
- Hyalella paramoensis Andres, 1988
- Hyalella patagonica (Cunningham, 1871)
- Hyalella pauperocovae Gonzalez & Watling, 2002
- Hyalella pernix (Moreira, 1903)
- Hyalella pleoacuta Gonzalez, Bond-Buckup & Araujo, 2006
- Hyalella pseudoazteca Gonzalez & Watling, 2003
- Hyalella pteropus Schellenberg, 1943
- Hyalella puna Peralta & Miranda, 2019
- Hyalella quindioensis Gonzalez & Watling, 2003
- Hyalella rioantensis Penoni & Bueno in Reis, Penoni & Bueno, 2020
- Hyalella rionegrina Grosso & Peralta, 1999
- Hyalella robusta Chevreux, 1907
- Hyalella sandro Baldinger, Shepard & Threloff, 2000
- Hyalella sapropelica Brehm, 1939
- Hyalella solida Chevreux, 1907
- Hyalella spelaea Bueno & Cardoso, 2011
- Hyalella spinicauda Soucek & Lazo-Wasem in Soucek & Lazo-Wasem, Taylor & Major, 2015
- Hyalella squamosa Mateus & Mateus, 1990
- Hyalella tepehuana Marrón-Becerra, Hermoso-Salazar & Rivas, 2020
- Hyalella texana Stevenson & Peden, 1973
- Hyalella thomseni Brehm, 1928
- Hyalella troglofugia Bastos-Pereira, De Oliveira & Ferreira, 2018
- Hyalella veredae Cardoso & Bueno, 2014
- Hyalella wakulla Drumm & Knight-Gray, 2019
- Hyalella warmingi Stebbing, 1899
- Hyalella wellborni Soucek & Lazo-Wasem in Soucek & Lazo-Wasem, Taylor & Major, 2015
- Hyalella xakriaba Bueno & Araujo, in Bueno, Araujo, Cardoso, Gomes & Bond-Buckup, 2013
- Hyalella yashmara Tomikawa, Kawasaki, Leiva & Arroyo, 2023
