= Ranatra montezuma =

Scientific classification
- Domain: Eukaryota
- Kingdom: Animalia
- Phylum: Arthropoda
- Class: Insecta
- Order: Hemiptera
- Suborder: Heteroptera
- Family: Nepidae
- Genus: Ranatra
- Species: R. montezuma

Binomial name
- Ranatra montezuma J. Polhemus, 1976

Species of true bug

Ranatra montezuma is a species of waterscorpion in the family Nepidae. It is endemic to Montezuma Well in Yavapai County, Arizona, United States.
