= Montezuma Well =

Natural limestone sinkhole near Rimrock, Arizona

Coordinates: 34°38′57″N 111°45′08″W

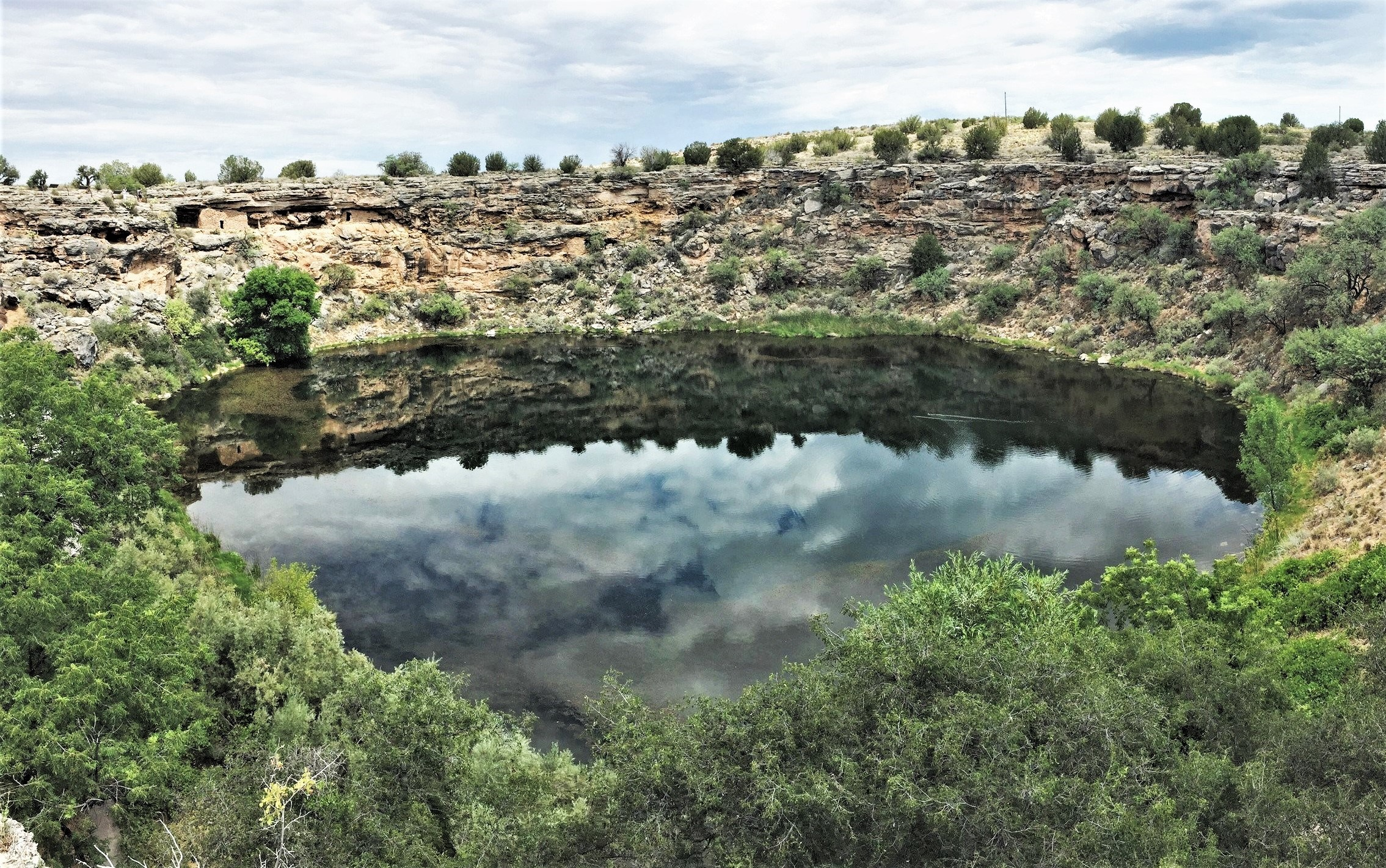
Montezuma Well in 2016

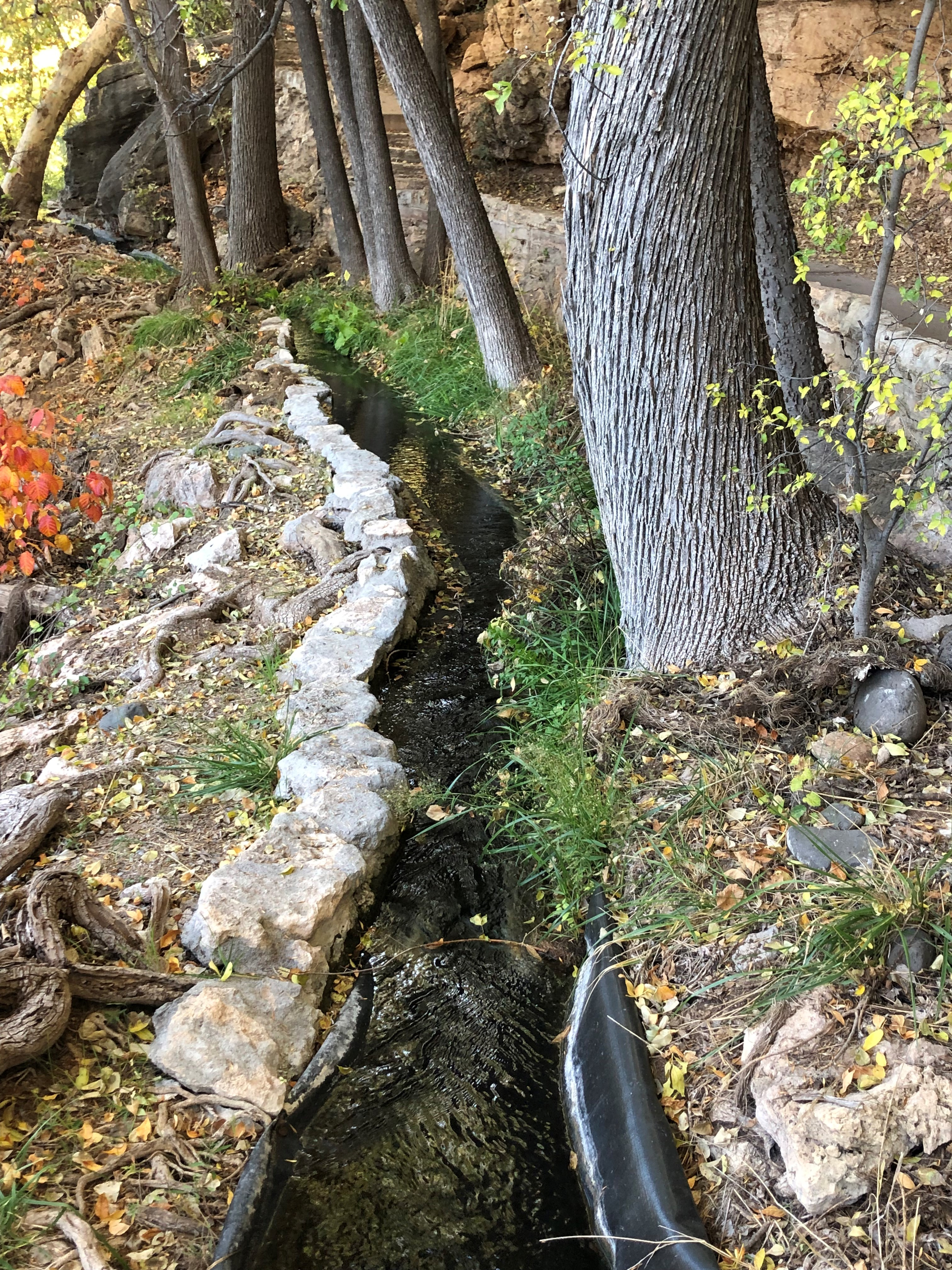
Montezuma Well irrigation ditch, used since antiquity, but rebuilt many times.

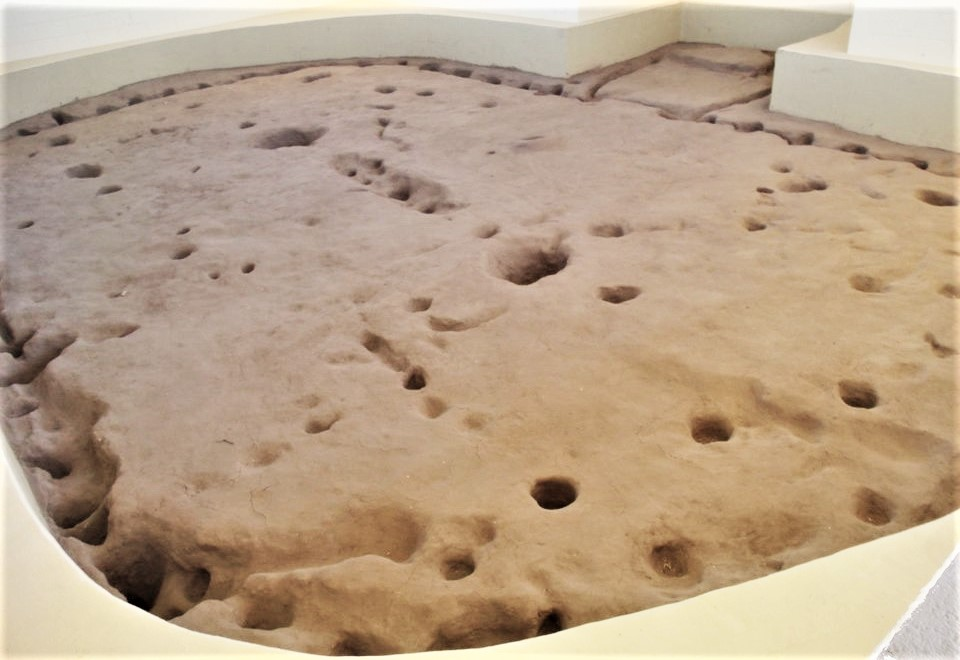
The pithouse ruin; the two largest holes in the dirt floor held the timber which supported the roof. The holes around the edge reveal the outline of the structure.

Montezuma Well (Yavapai: ʼHakthkyayva), a detached unit of Montezuma Castle National Monument, is a natural limestone sinkhole near the town of Lake Montezuma, Arizona, through which some 1,500,000 US gallons (5,700,000 L; 1,200,000 imp gal) of water emerge each day from an underground spring. It is located about 11 miles (18 km) northeast of Montezuma Castle.

The "well" measures 386 feet (118 m) in diameter from rim to rim and contains a near-constant volume of spring water even in times of severe drought. The water is highly carbonated and contains high levels of arsenic. At least five endemic species, the most of any spring in the southwestern United States, are found exclusively in Montezuma Well: a diatom, the Montezuma Well springsnail, a water scorpion, the Hyalella montezuma amphipod, and the Motobdella montezuma leech.

Montezuma Well's steady outflow has been used for irrigation since the 8th century. Part of a prehistoric irrigation ditch is preserved near the park's picnic ground, and portions of the ditch's original route are still in use today.

As with Montezuma Castle, the label "Montezuma" is a misnomer: the Aztec emperor Montezuma had no connection to the site or the early indigenous peoples that occupied the area.

== Geology ==
Montezuma Well is geologically very similar to the sinkholes and cenotes found in Florida and the Yucatán peninsula of Mexico, that is, a limestone cave which has collapsed to expose its subterranean water source. The Well sits at the northern end of the Verde Limestone formation, a distinct layer of travertine limestone more than 2,000 feet (610 m) thick in some places, which was deposited beneath a series of shallow lakes that covered Arizona's central Verde Valley region between 8 and 2 million years ago.

== History ==
Archaeological evidence suggests that humans have lived in the Verde Valley for at least 10,000 years. The earliest signs of permanent settlement in the area appear quite a bit later, however, around 600 CE.

The ruins of several prehistoric dwellings are scattered in and around the rim of the Well. Their inhabitants belonged to several indigenous American cultures that are believed to have occupied the Verde Valley between 700 and 1425 CE, the foremost of which being a cultural group archaeologists have termed the Southern Sinagua. The earliest of the ruins located on the property (with the exception of the irrigation canal), a "pithouse" in the traditional Hohokam style, dates to about 1050 CE. More than 50 countable "rooms" are found inside the park boundaries; it is likely that some were used for purposes other than living space, including food storage and religious ceremonies.

The Sinagua people, and possibly earlier cultures, intensively farmed the land surrounding the Well using its constant outflow as a reliable source of irrigation. Beginning about 700 CE, the Well's natural drainage into the immediately adjacent Wet Beaver Creek was diverted into a man-made canal running parallel to the creek, segments of which still conduct the outflow today. The prehistoric canal, estimated at nearly seven miles in length, likely drained into a network of smaller lateral canals downstream, supplying perhaps as much as 60 acres of farmland with water. The route of the modern canal is partly original, especially close to the outlet, but large portions have been re-routed over time as irrigation needs have changed. Much of the abandoned original route is still visible within the park, however, as the warm water emerging from the Well contains a high concentration of lime, which over many centuries was deposited along the canal walls as the water cooled downstream; the accumulated lime has since hardened into a cement-like coating, preserving the canal's shape.

The existence of the Well was almost unknown to European Americans before the publishing of Handbook to Arizona by Richard J. Hinton in 1878. In 1968, Montezuma Well was the subject of the first ever underwater archaeological survey to take place in a federally managed park, led by archaeologist George R Fischer.

The Yavapai people consider the Well a deeply sacred site, as they believe it is the place through which they emerged into the world.

== Ecology ==
The high concentration of dissolved carbon dioxide gas in the water of the Well – which amounts to more than 80 times the typical freshwater concentration – and to a lesser extent its alkalinity, has prevented the development of any kind of fish population, so the Well remains a fishless spring. However, other types of aquatic life have managed to adapt: at least five endemic species, the most of any spring in the southwestern United States, are found exclusively in Montezuma Well: a diatom Gomphonema montezumense, the Montezuma Well springsnail, a water scorpion, the amphipod known as Hyalella montezuma, and the leech species Motobdella montezuma. Many different bird species feed on these organisms and the plant life found in the water.

In recent years Illinois pondweed (Potamogeton illinoensis) has invaded the Well. Weekly maintenance is required to keep water from the Well flowing through the natural outlet and into the irrigation ditch.

== Gallery ==
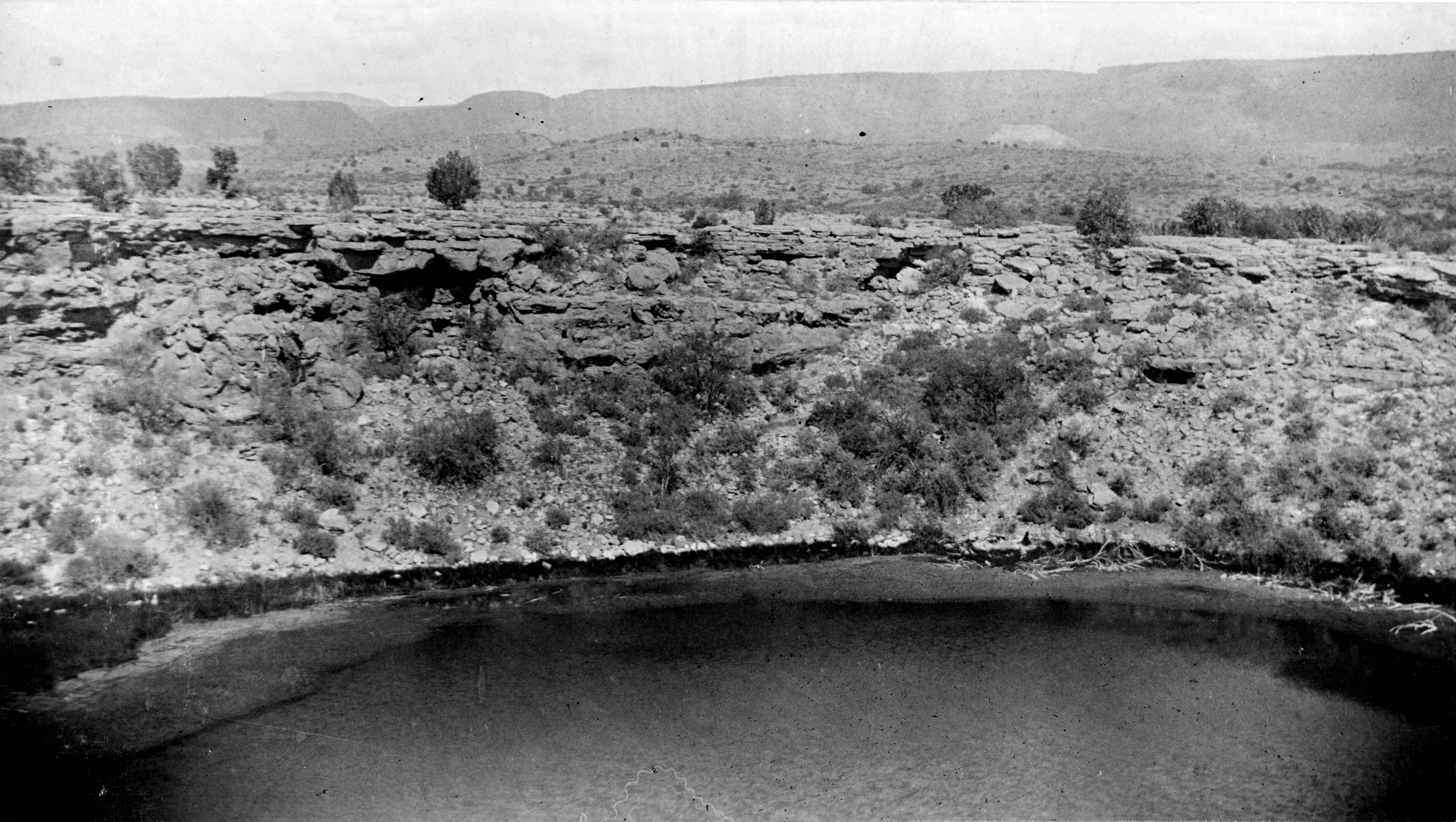
View of Montezuma Well from 1887

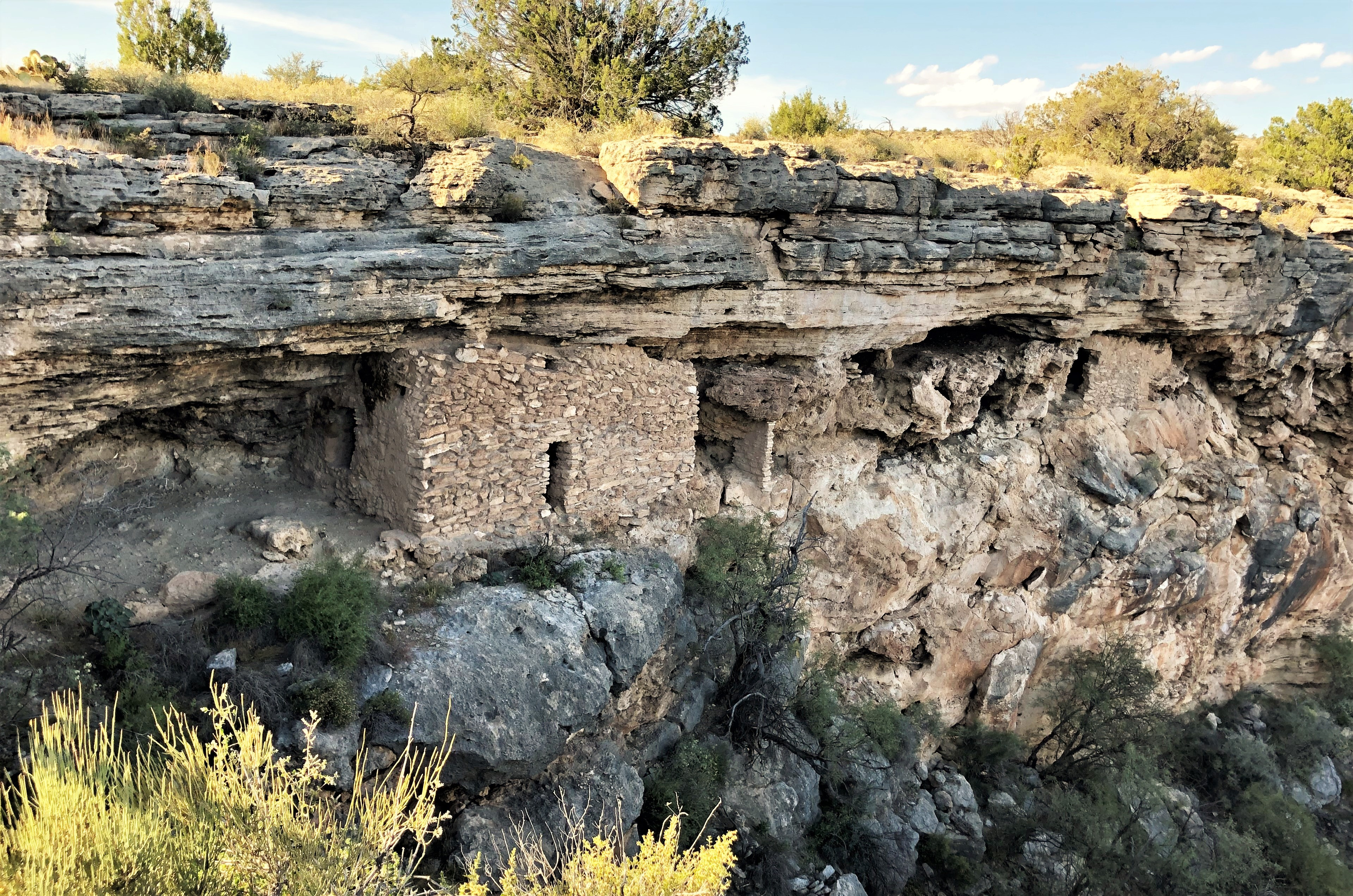
Cliff dwellings of the Sinagua people

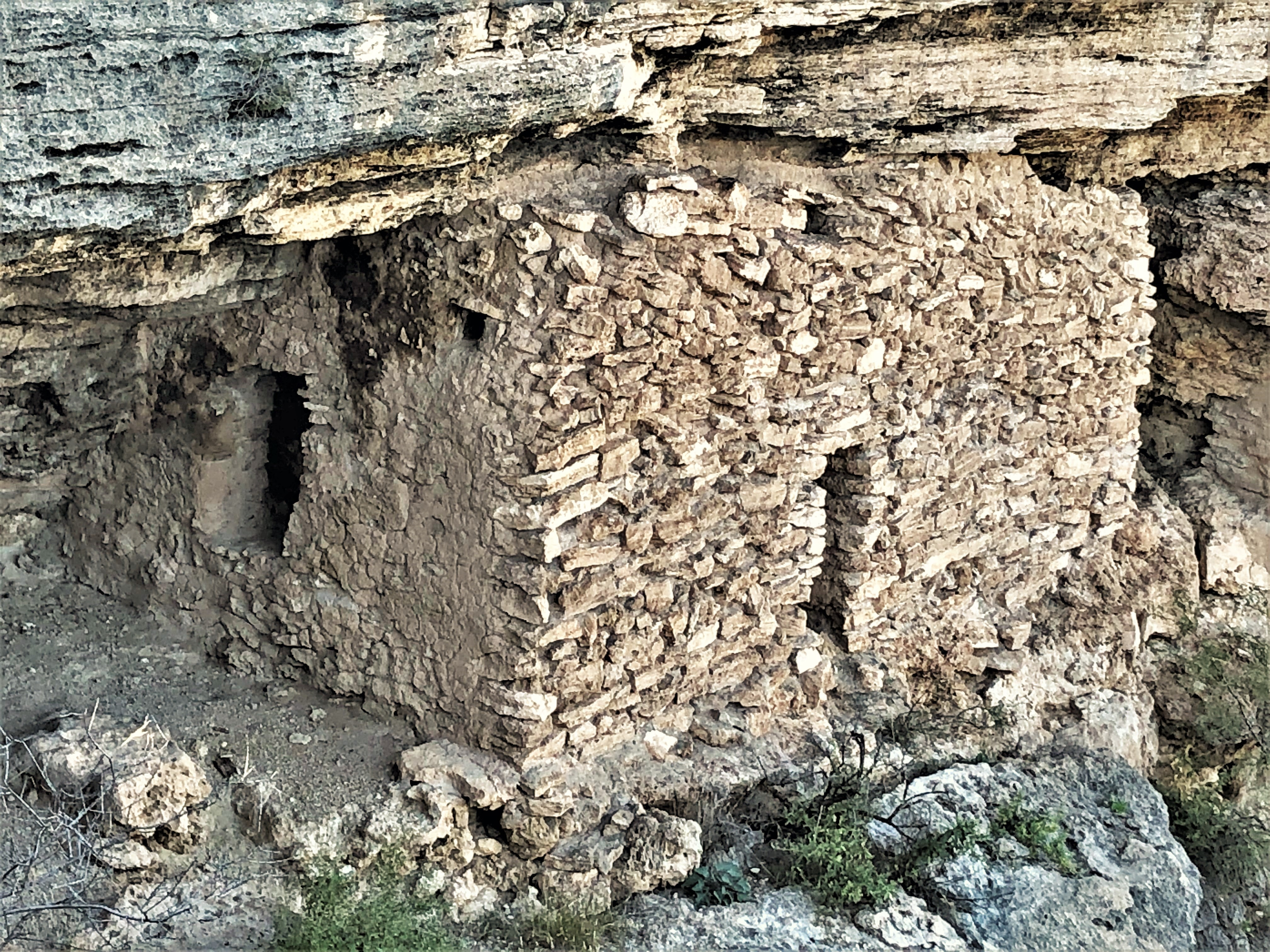
Close-up view of one of the cliff dwellings

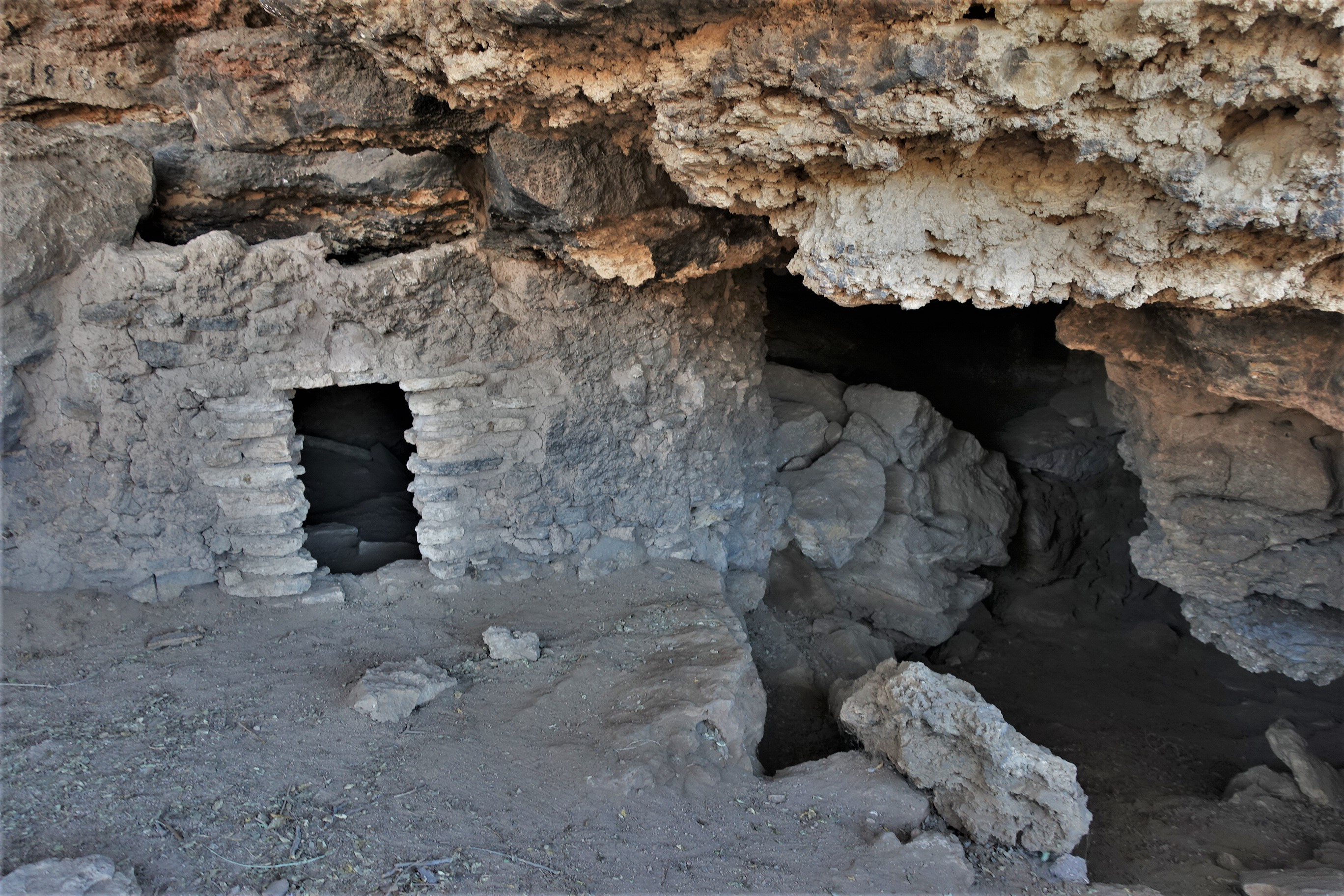
The Swallet ruin

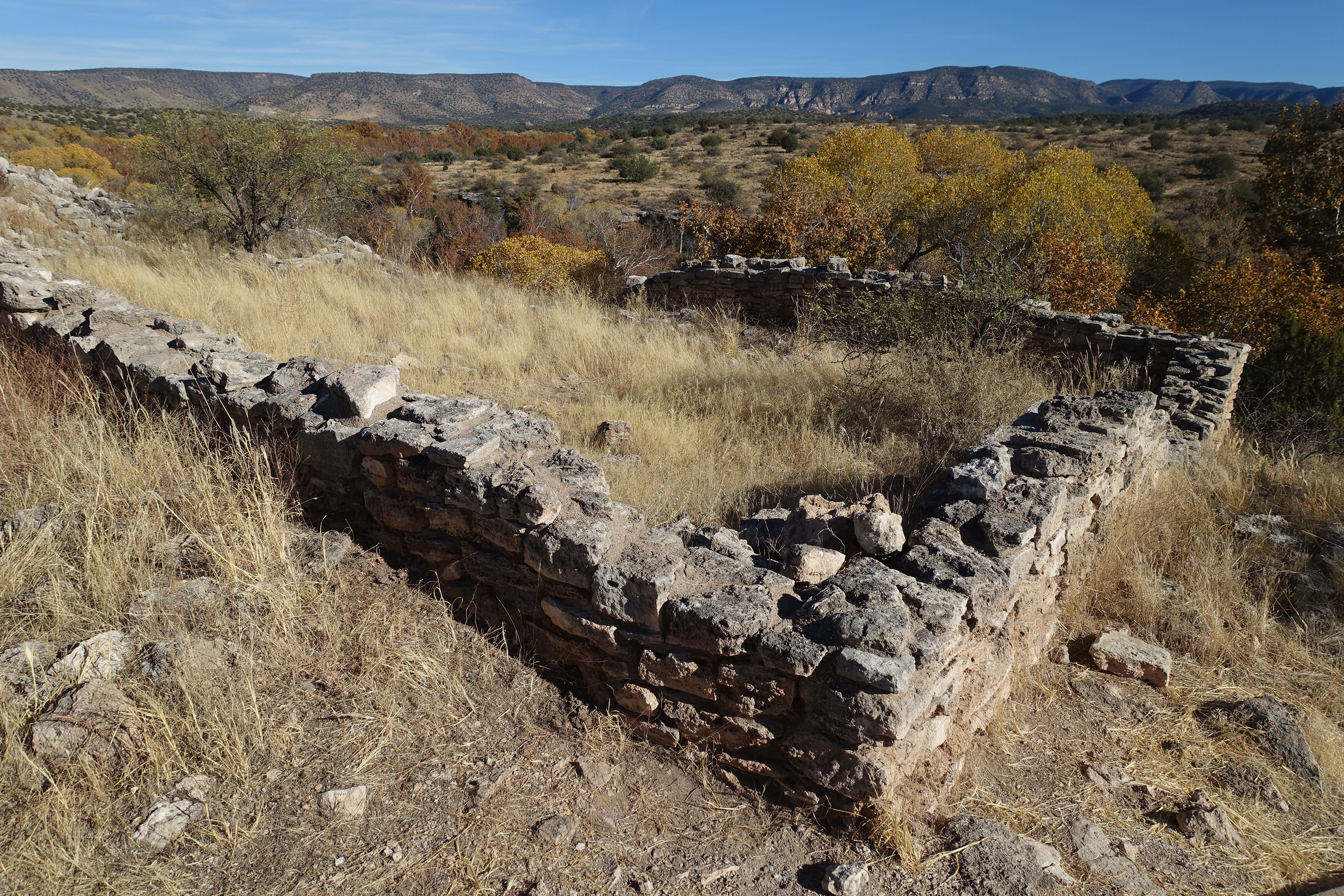
Ruins of a Sinagua house which dates back to 1050 CE

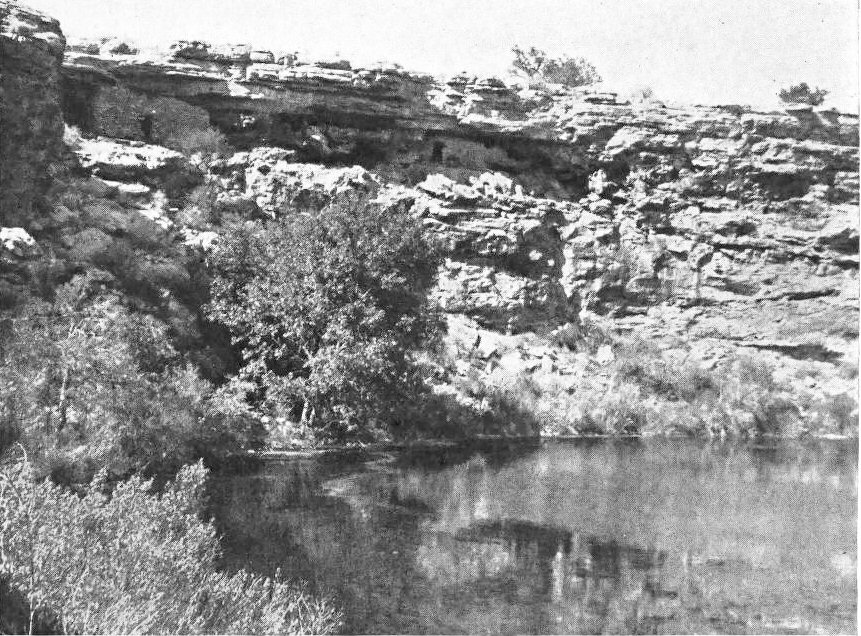
Northern Arizona, Montezuma's Well, photo by Earl K. Foreman (1924)

== See also ==
- List of sinkholes of the United States
