= Mimobdella =

Scientific classification
- Kingdom: Animalia
- Phylum: Annelida
- Clade: Pleistoannelida
- Clade: Sedentaria
- Class: Clitellata
- Subclass: Hirudinea
- Order: Arhynchobdellida
- Family: Salifidae
- Genus: Mimobdella; Blanchard, 1897

Genus of leeches

Mimobdella is a genus of leeches belonging to the family Salifidae.

The species of this genus are found in south east Asia.

== Species ==
Species:

- Mimobdella africana Moore, 1939
- Mimobdella buettikoferi Blanchard, 1897
- Mimobdella japonica Blanchard, 1897
