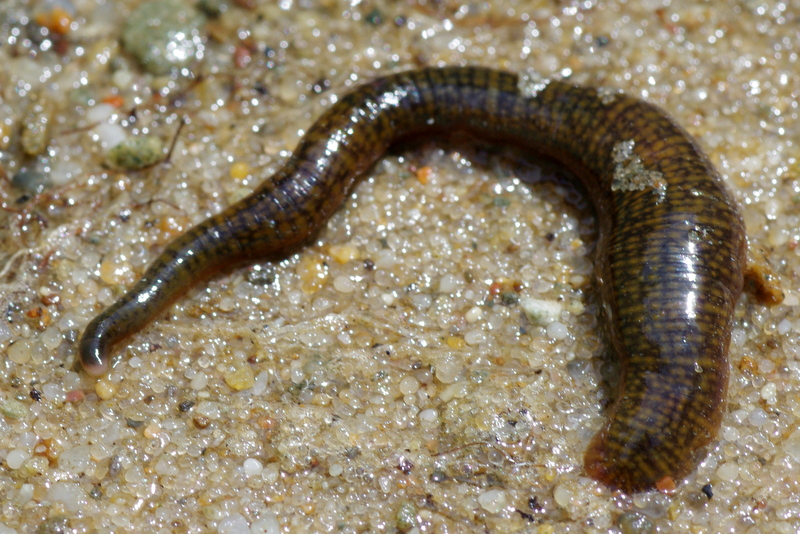
- Erpobdella octoculata

Scientific classification
- Kingdom: Animalia
- Phylum: Annelida
- Clade: Pleistoannelida
- Clade: Sedentaria
- Class: Clitellata
- Subclass: Hirudinea
- Order: Arhynchobdellida
- Family: Erpobdellidae
- Genus: Erpobdella; Blainville, 1818

Type species
- Erpobdella octoculata (Linnaeus, 1758)

Species
- See text

Synonyms
- Croatobranchus Kerovec, Kučinić & Jalžic, 1999; Mooreobdella Pawlowski, 1955; Nephelopsis Verrill, 1872; Semiscolecides Augener, 1930; Trocheta Dutrochet, 1817

= Erpobdella =

Genus of leeches

Erpobdella is a genus of leeches in the family Erpobdellidae. Members of the genus have three or four pairs of eyes, but never have true jaws, and are typically 20–50 millimetres (0.8–2.0 in) long. All members do not feed on blood, but instead are predators of small aquatic invertebrates, which they often swallow whole.

== Species ==
The genus includes species previously classified under the genera Croatobranchus, Mooreobdella, Trocheta and Nephelopsis. These were synonymized into Erpobdella by Sidall (2002) after morphogenetic analysis. There are over 30 currently accepted species:

- Erpobdella adani (Tessler, Siddall, & Oceguera-Figueroa, 2018)
- Erpobdella anoculata (Moore, 1898)
- Erpobdella bhatiai Nesemann, 2007
- Erpobdella borisi Chichocka et al., 2015
- Erpobdella bucera (Moore, 1953)
- Erpobdella bykowski (Gedroyc, 1913)
- Erpobdella concolor Annandale, 1913
- Erpobdella costata Sawyer & Shelley, 1976
- Erpobdella dubia (Moore & Meyer, 1951)
- Erpobdella fervida (Verrill, 1874)
- Erpobdella japonica (Pawlowski, 1952)
- Erpobdella johanssoni (Johansson, 1927)
- Erpobdella krasense (Sket, 1968)
- Erpobdella lahontana Hovingh & Klemm, 2000
- Erpobdella luguensis Liu, 1984
- Erpobdella melanostoma (Sawyer & Shelley, 1976)
- Erpobdella mestrovi (Kerovec, Kučinić & Jalžić, 1999)
- Erpobdella mexicana (Dugès, 1872)
- Erpobdella microstoma (Moore, 1901)
- Erpobdella monostriata (Lindenfeld et Pietruszynski, 1890)
- Erpobdella nigricollis (Brandes, 1900)
- Erpobdella obscura (Verrill, 1872)
- Erpobdella octoculata (Linnaeus, 1758)
- Erpobdella ochoterenai Caballero, 1932
- Erpobdella punctata (Leidy, 1870)
- Erpobdella quaternaria (Moore, 1930)
- Erpobdella sibirica Kaygorodova, 2024
- Erpobdella subviridis (Dutrochet, 1817)
- Erpobdella testacea (Savigny, 1820)
- Erpobdella tetragon (Sawyer & Shelley, 1976)
- Erpobdella triannulata Moore, 1908
- Erpobdella vilnensis (Liskiewicz, 1925)
- Erpobdella wuttkei Kutschera, 2004
