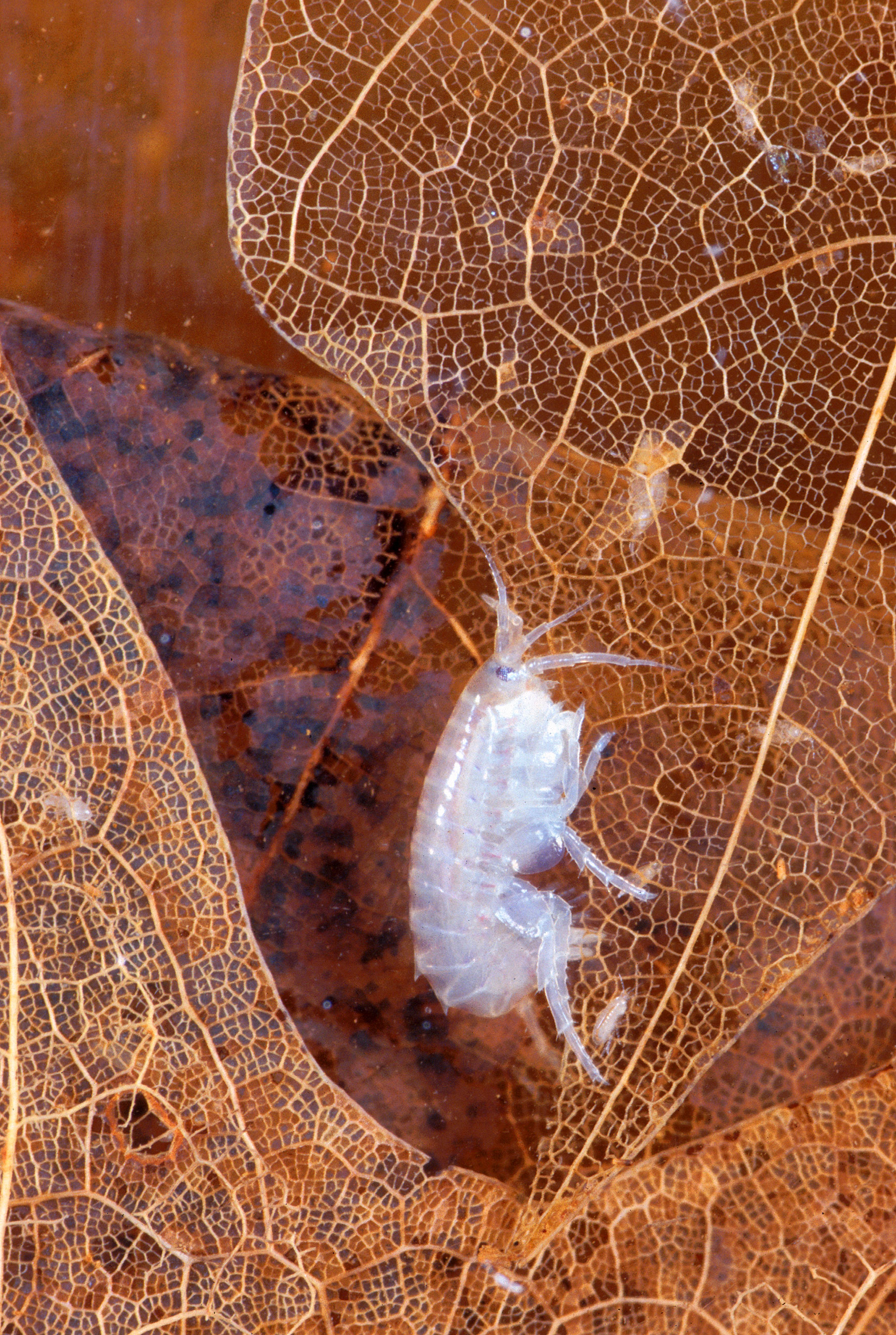
- Hyalella azteca

Scientific classification
- Kingdom: Animalia
- Phylum: Arthropoda
- Clade: Pancrustacea
- Class: Malacostraca
- Order: Amphipoda
- Parvorder: Talitridira
- Superfamily: Hyaloidea
- Family: Dogielinotidae; Gurjanova, 1953

Genera
- Dogielinotinae; Hyalellinae; Najniinae

= Dogielinotidae =

Family of crustaceans

Dogielinotidae is a family of amphipods. It is subdivided into three subfamilies, containing a total of twelve genera:

Dogielinotinae Gurjanova, 1953

- Allorchestes Dana, 1849
- Dogielinoides Bousfield, 1982
- Dogielinotus Gurjanova, 1953
- Eohaustorioides Bousfield & Tzvetkova, 1982
- Exhyalella Stebbing, 1917
- Haustorioides Oldevig, 1958
- Marinohyalella Lazo-Wasem & Gable, 2001
- Parhyalella Kunkel, 1910
- Proboscinotus Bousfield, 1982

Hyalellinae Bulycheva, 1957

- Hyalella Smith, 1874

Najniinae Barnard, 1972

- ?Insula Kunkel, 1910
- Najna Derzhavin, 1937
