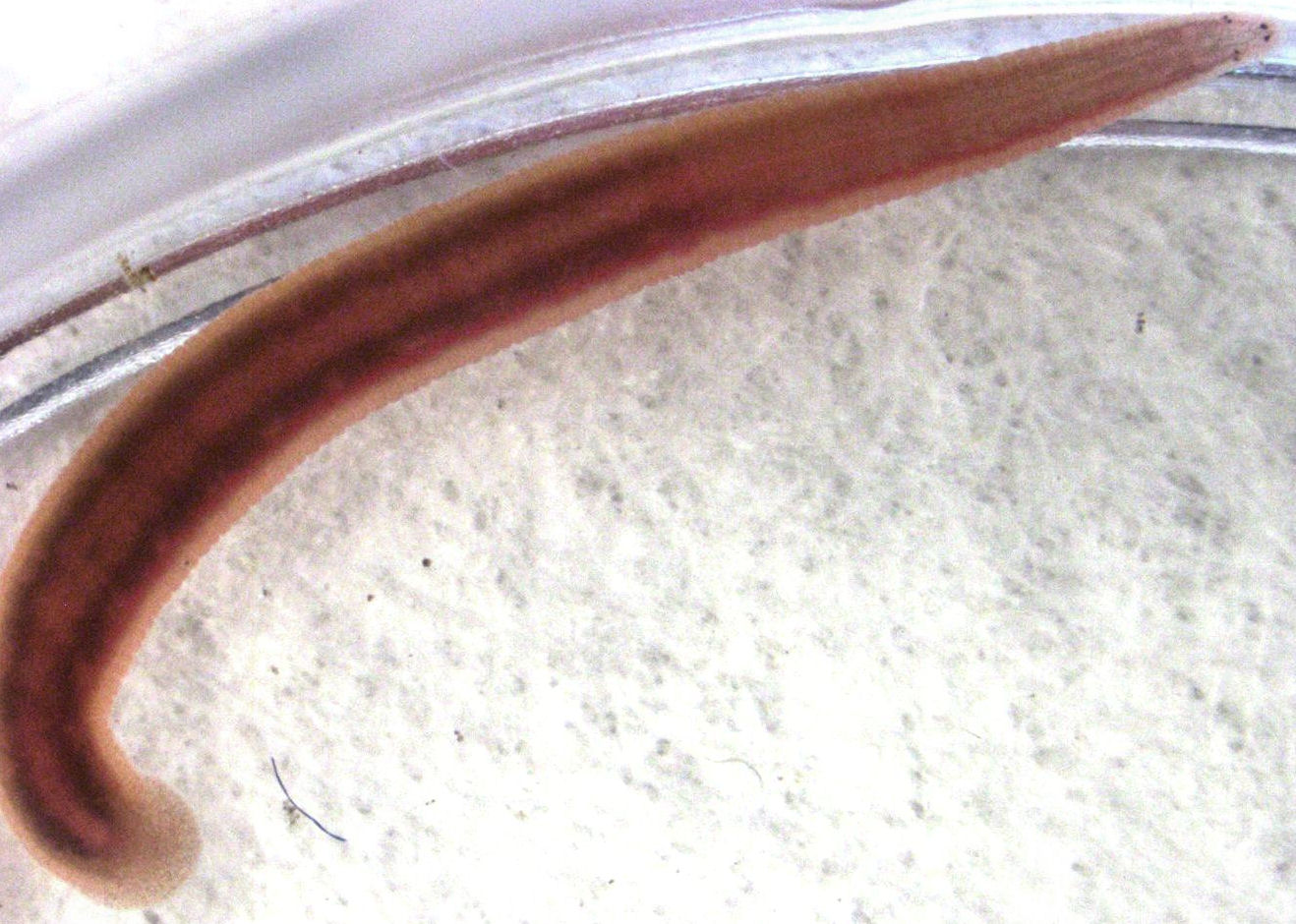
- Barbronia weberi

Scientific classification
- Kingdom: Animalia
- Phylum: Annelida
- Clade: Pleistoannelida
- Clade: Sedentaria
- Class: Clitellata
- Subclass: Hirudinea
- Order: Arhynchobdellida
- Suborder: Erpobdelliformes
- Family: Salifidae; Johansson, 1909

= Salifidae =

Family of annelid worms

Salifidae is a family of annelids belonging to the order Arhynchobdellida. Like all leeches, salifids are hermaphrodites and most are very good swimmers. Salifids live in aerated streams in Africa, Asia, and some Pacific islands. They are macrophagous carnivores, rather than haematophagous (blood-sucking), and swallow their prey whole. Prey animals include mainly chironomid larvae. Salifids have pharyngeal stylets rather than the jaws or probosces present in other leeches.

== Genera ==
GBIF includes:

1. Barbronia Johansson, 1918
2. Dineta Goddard, 1908
3. Linta Westergren & Siddall, 2004
4. Lumbricobdella Kennel, 1886
5. Mimobdella Blanchard, 1897
6. Odontobdella Oka, 1923
7. Salifa Blanchard, 1897
8. Sinodontobdella Nesemann et al., 2007
