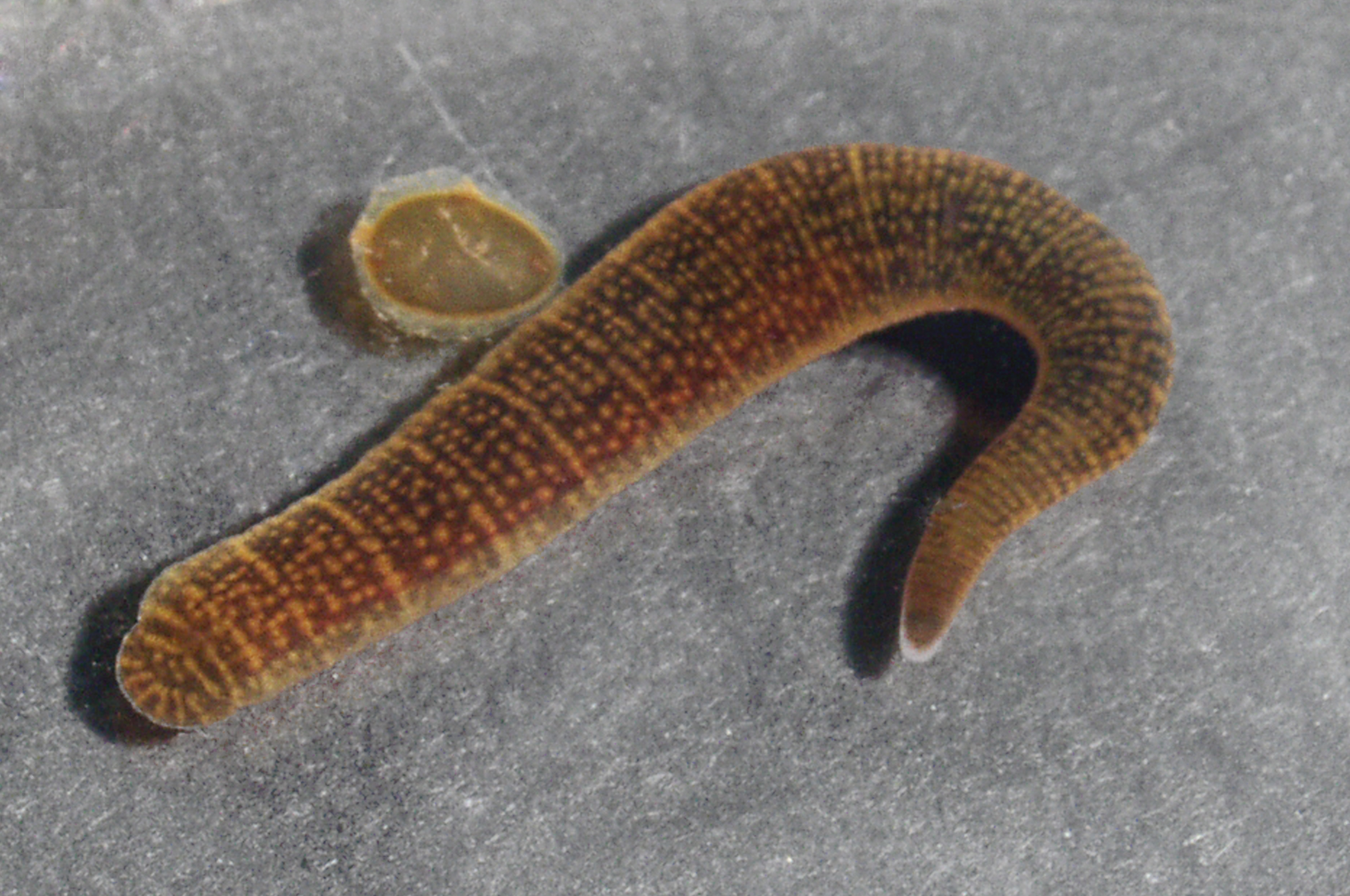
- Erpobdella octoculata

Scientific classification
- Kingdom: Animalia
- Phylum: Annelida
- Clade: Pleistoannelida
- Clade: Sedentaria
- Class: Clitellata
- Subclass: Hirudinea
- Order: Arhynchobdellida
- Suborder: Erpobdelliformes
- Family: Erpobdellidae; Blanchard, 1894

Genera
- Dina Blanchard, 1892; Erpobdella de Blainville, 1818; Motobdella Govedich, Blinn, Keim et Davies, 1998; Trocheta Dutrochet, 1817

= Erpobdellidae =

Family of annelids

Erpobdellidae is a family of leeches. It is one of the four families belonging to the suborder Erpobdelliformes of the proboscisless leeches order, Arhynchobdellida.

Their members have abandoned the blood feeding habits of their ancestors and are instead predators of aquatic invertebrates. The family previously contained seven genera, but Siddall (2002) synonymized five genera (Croatobranchus, Dina, Mooreobdella, Trocheta and Nephelopsis) into the genus Erpobdella based on morphogenetic analysis, with the remaining genus Motobdella possibly a sister group and thus retained. This decision was not accepted by scientific community.

The family currently contains 3 genera Erpobdella, Dina, Trocheta and Motobdella.

The genus Mimobdella was also sometimes included within Erpobdellidae or Gastrostomobdellidae but is now accepted to be under the family Salifidae.
