= Chromosome 11 =

Human chromosome

- Human chromosome 11 pair after G-banding. One is from mother, one is from father.

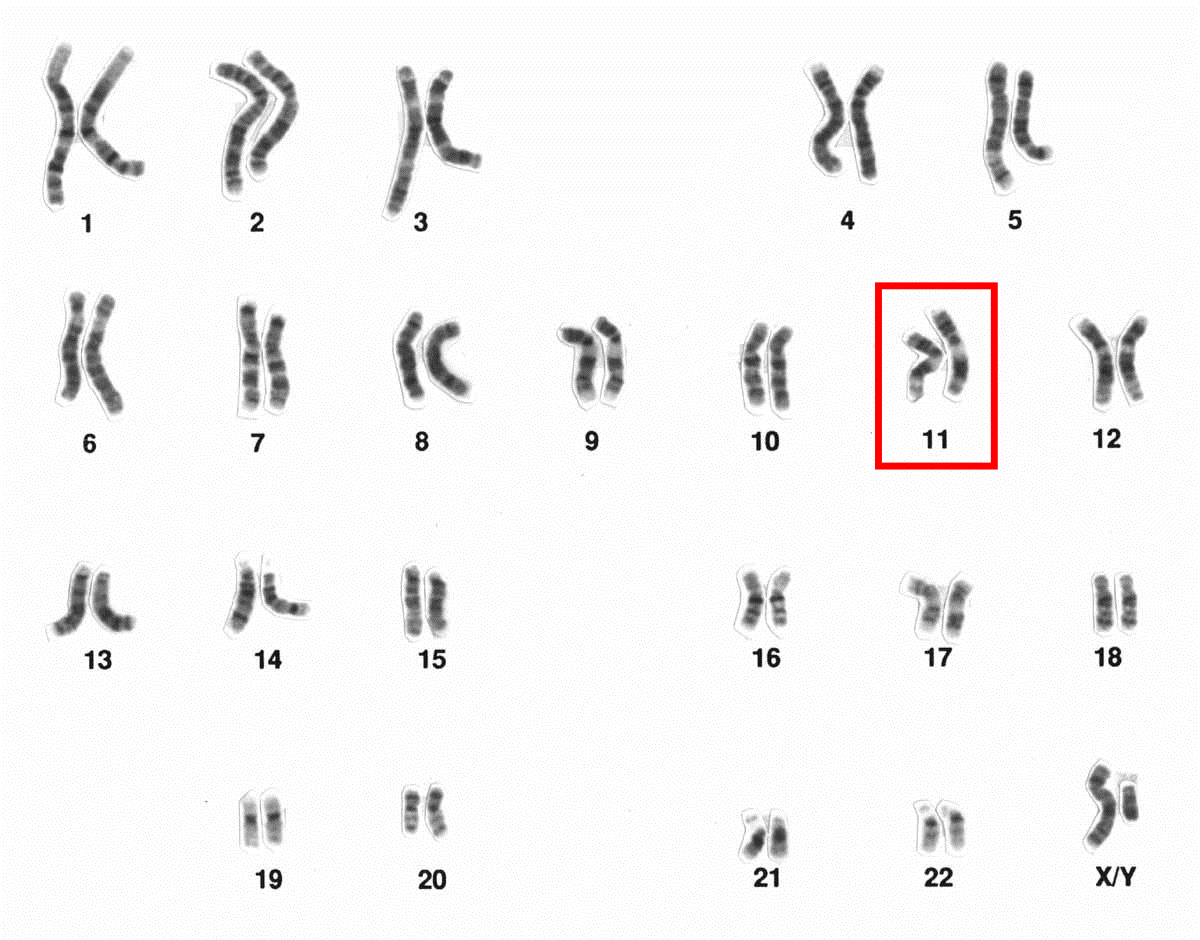
- Chromosome 11 pair in human male karyogram.

Features
- Length (bp): 135,127,769 bp (CHM13)
- No. of genes: 1,224 (CCDS)
- Type: Autosome
- Centromere position: Submetacentric (53.4 Mbp)

Complete gene lists
- CCDS: Gene list
- HGNC: Gene list
- UniProt: Gene list
- NCBI: Gene list

External map viewers
- Ensembl: Chromosome 11
- Entrez: Chromosome 11
- NCBI: Chromosome 11
- UCSC: Chromosome 11

Full DNA sequences
- RefSeq: NC_000011 (FASTA)
- GenBank: CM000673 (FASTA)

Chromosome 11 is one of the 23 pairs of chromosomes in humans. Humans normally have two copies of this chromosome. Chromosome 11 spans about 135 million base pairs (the building material of DNA) and represents between 4 and 4.5 percent of the total DNA in cells. The shorter arm (p arm) is termed 11p while the longer arm (q arm) is 11q. At about 21.5 genes per megabase, chromosome 11 is one of the most gene-rich, and disease-rich, chromosomes in the human genome.

More than 40% of the 856 olfactory receptor genes in the human genome are located in 28 single-gene and multi-gene clusters along the chromosome.

== Gene ==
=== Number of genes ===
The following are some of the gene count estimates of human chromosome 11. Because researchers use different approaches to genome annotation their predictions of the number of genes on each chromosome varies (for technical details, see gene prediction). Among various projects, the collaborative consensus coding sequence project (CCDS) takes an extremely conservative strategy. So CCDS's gene number prediction represents a lower bound on the total number of human protein-coding genes.

Estimated by	Protein-coding genes	Non-coding RNA genes	Pseudogenes	Source	Release date
CCDS	1,224	—	—		2016-09-08
HGNC	1,262	271	666		2017-05-12
Ensembl	1,301	1,060	811		2017-03-29
UniProt	1,327	—	—		2018-02-28
NCBI	1,314	860	839		2017-05-19

=== Gene list ===
The following is a partial list of genes on human chromosome 11. For complete list, see the links in the infobox on the right.

- ACAT1: acetyl-Coenzyme A acetyltransferase 1 (acetoacetyl Coenzyme A thiolase)
- ACRV1: encoding protein Acrosomal protein SP-10
- AKIP1: A kinase interacting protein 1
- ALKBH3 encoding protein AlkB homolog 3, alpha-ketoglutaratedependent dioxygenase
- AMOTL1: angiomotin-like protein 1
- AMPD3: encoding enzyme AMP deaminase 3
- API5: encoding protein Apoptosis inhibitor 5
- APLNR: Apelin receptor (APJ receptor)
- APOA4: apolipoprotein A-IV
- ARCN1 encoding protein Archain 1
- ART5: encoding protein Adp-ribosyltransferase 5
- ASRGL1: encoding enzyme L-asparaginase
- ATM: ataxia telangiectasia mutated (includes complementation groups A, C and D)
- B3GNT1: encoding enzyme N-acetyllactosaminide beta-1,3-N-acetylglucosaminyltransferase
- BATF2: encoding protein Basic leucine zipper transcription factor, ATF-like 2
- BDNF: secretes BDNF, a member of the Neurotrophin family of proteins
- C11orf1: encoding protein
- C11orf16: encoding protein Uncharacterized protein C11orf16
- C11orf49: encoding protein UPF0705 protein C11orf49
- C11orf52 encoding protein C11orf52
- C11orf53: encoding protein Chromosome 11 open reading frame 53
- BKGD: encoding protein Beta-keto L-gulonate decarboxylase
- C11orf80: encoding protein Chromosome 11 open reading frame 80
- C11orf86: encoding protein Uncharacterized protein C11orf86
- C1QTNF4 encoding protein C1q and tumor necrosis factor related protein 4
- C1QTNF5: encoding protein C1q and tumor necrosis factor related protein 5
- CAPRIN1: encoding protein, cell cycle associated protein 1
- CCDC88B: encoding protein Coiled-coil domain containing 88b
- CCDC90B: coiled coil domain containing 90B
- CCL9: Chemokine (C-C motif) ligand 9
- CD81: cluster of differentiation 81
- CDHR5: cadherin related family member 5
- CLDN25: encoding protein Claudin 25
- COMMD9: COMM domain-containing protein 9
- CPSF7: Cleavage and polyadenylation specificity factor subunit 7
- CPT1A: carnitine palmitoyltransferase 1A (liver)
- CREBZF encoding protein CREB/ATF bZIP transcription factor
- DAK: Triokinase/FMN cyclase
- DDI1: encoding protein DNA-damage inducible 1 homolog 1 (S. cerevisiae)
- DGAT2 encoding protein Diacylglycerol O-acyltransferase 2
- DHCR7: 7-dehydrocholesterol reductase
- DKK3: Dickkopf-related protein 3
- DPF2: Double PHD fingers 2
- DRD4: Dopamine receptor D4 at 11p15.5
- DSCAML1: encoding protein Down syndrome cell adhesion molecule like 1
- EI24: Etoposide-induced protein 2.4 homolog
- FAM118B: encoding protein Family with sequence similarity 118, member B
- FAM76B: Family with sequence similarity 76 member B
- FAR1: fatty acyl-coA reductase 1
- FAT3: fat atypical cadherin 3
- FHIP: FTS and Hook-interacting protein
- FNBP4: Formin-binding protein 4
- FOLR3: encoding protein Folate receptor gamma
- GLB1L3: galactosidase, beta 1-like 3
- GLYAT: Glycine-N-acyltransferase
- GLYATL2 encoding protein Glycine-N-acyltransferase like 2
- GPHA2: Glycoprotein hormone alpha-2
- GYLTL1B: Glycosyltransferase-like protein LARGE2
- HBB: hemoglobin, beta
- HBBP1: encoding protein Hemoglobin, beta pseudogene 1
- HIKESHI: chromosome 11, open reading frame 73
- HMBS: hydroxymethylbilane VIIA
- HRASLS3: adipose phospholipase A2
- HTATIP2: HIV-1 Tat interactive protein 2
- HYLS1: Hydroletalus (Finnish heritage disease) related gene
- HYOU1: hypoxia upregulated protein 1
- IFITM2 encoding protein Interferon induced transmembrane protein 2
- IFT46: intraflagellar transport protein 46 homolog
- IGF2-AS: encoding protein IGF2 antisense RNA
- INS: insulin gene
- KDM2A: lysine demethylase 2A
- KIAA1549L encoding protein KIAA1549-like
- KRTAP5-6: encoding protein Keratin associated protein 5-6
- LPXN: leupaxin
- LRFN4 encoding protein Leucine rich repeat and fibronectin type III domain containing 4
- MADD: MAP kinase-activating death domain protein
- MEN1: Multiple endocrine neoplasia type 1
- MIR210: encoding protein MicroRNA 210
- MIRLET7A2: microRNA let-7a-2
- MMP7: Matrix metalloproteinases (MMP family)
- MOGAT2: monoacylglycerol O-acyltransferase 2
- MTRNR2L8: encoding protein MT-RNR2-like 8
- NADSYN1: NAD synthetase 1
- NAP1L4: nucleosome assembly protein 1-like 4
- NFRKB: nuclear factor related to kappa-B binding protein
- NNMT: nicotinamide N-methyltransferase
- NRGN: neurogranin
- OR2AG2: encoding protein Olfactory receptor family 2 subfamily ag member 2
- P53AIP1: p53-regulated apoptosis-inducing protein 1
- PANO1: encoding protein PANO1
- PAX6: paired box 6
- PCNX3 encoding protein Pecanex homolog 3
- PGA3 encoding protein Pepsinogen 3, group I (pepsinogen A)
- PIWIL4 encoding protein Piwi like RNA-mediated gene silencing 4
- PLET1: encoding protein Placenta expressed transcript 1
- PRR5L: proline rich 5 like
- PTPRCAP: protein tyrosine phosphatase receptor type C associated protein
- PTS: 6-pyruvoyltetrahydropterin synthase
- QSER1: glutamine serine rich protein 1
- RAG1/RAG2: recombination activating genes
- RASSF7: encoding protein Ras association domain family member 7
- RASSF10: encoding protein Ras association domain family member 10
- RELT: tumor necrosis factor recepteor
- REXO2: RNA exonuclease 2
- RNH1: ribonuclease inhibitor 1
- RNU2-2: encoding protein RNA, U2 small nuclear 2
- ROM1: retinal outer segment membrane protein 1
- RPL27A: encoding protein 60S ribosomal protein L27a
- RPL36A: encoding protein 60S ribosomal protein L36a
- RSF1: remodeling and spacing factor 1
- SAA1: serum amyloid A1
- SAA2: serum amyloid A2
- SAC3D1: SAC3 domain-containing protein 1
- SART1: squamous cell carcinoma antigen recognized by T-cells 1
- SBF2: SET binding factor 2
- SCGB1D2: secretoglobin family 1D member 2
- SESN3 encoding protein Sestrin 3
- SIDT2 encoding protein SID1 transmembrane family member 2
- SLC17A6: encoding protein Solute carrier family 17 (vesicular glutamate transporter), member 6
- SLC25A22: encoding protein Solute carrier family 25 member 22
- SMAP1: small acidic protein
- SMCO4: encoding protein SMCO4
- SMPD1: sphingomyelin phosphodiesterase 1, acid lysosomal (acid sphingomyelinase)
- SNHG1: encoding protein Small nucleolar rna host gene 1
- SPA17: sperm autoantigenic protein 17
- SRPRA: Srp receptor alpha subunit
- Suppression of tumorigenicity 2: encoding protein Suppression of tumorigenicity 2
- TAF1D: TATA box binding protein associated factor RNA polymerase 1 subunit D
- TALDO1 encoding protein Transaldolase 1
- TBRG1: transforming growth factor beta regulator 1
- TECTA: tectorin alpha (nonsyndromic deafness)
- TH: tyrosine hydroxylase
- THRSP: thyroid hormone inducible hepatic protein
- THYN1: thymocyte nuclear protein 1
- TIMM10: translocase of inner mitochondrial membrane 10
- TIMM10B: Mitochondrial import inner membrane translocase subunit Tim9 B
- TM7SF2: transmembrane 7 superfamily member 2
- TMEM109: encoding protein Transmembrane protein 109
- TMEM123: transmembrane protein 123
- TMEM126B: transmembrane protein 126B
- TMEM134: transmembrane protein 134
- TMEM25: transmembrane protein 25
- TMPRSS4: encoding protein Transmembrane protease, serine 4
- TP53I11: tumor protein 53 inducible protein 11
- TRAPPC4: trafficking protein particle complex subunit 4
- TRIM34: encoding protein Tripartite motif containing 34
- TRPT1: tRNA 2'-phosphotransferase 1
- UNC93B1: Unc-93 homolog B1
- UPK2: uroplakin-2
- UQCC3: encoding protein Ubiquinol-cytochrome c reductase complex assembly factor 3
- USH1C: Usher syndrome 1C (autosomal recessive, severe)
- USP47: ubiquitin specific peptidase 47
- UVRAG: UV radiation resistance associated
- VPS26B: vacuolar protein sorting 26 homolog B
- VSIG2: V-set and immunoglobulin domain containing 2
- WT1: Wilms tumor protein
- YIF1A: Yip1 interacting factor homolog A
- ZFP91-CNTF
- ZNF408: zinc finger protein 408

== Diseases and disorders ==
The following diseases and disorders are some of those related to genes on chromosome 11:

- autism (NRXN2)
- acute intermittent porphyria
- albinism
- ataxia–telangiectasia
- Beckwith–Wiedemann syndrome
- Best's disease
- beta-ketothiolase deficiency
- beta thalassemia
- bipolar disorder
- bladder cancer
- breast cancer
- carnitine palmitoyltransferase I deficiency
- Charcot–Marie–Tooth disease
- Cystic fibrosis
- Depression
- Denys–Drash syndrome
- familial Mediterranean fever
- Tourette syndrome
- Hereditary angioedema OMIM: 106100
- Jacobsen syndrome
- Jervell and Lange-Nielsen syndrome
- Mantle cell lymphoma (t11;14)
- Meckel syndrome
- methemoglobinemia, beta-globin type
- Mixed lineage leukemia
- multiple endocrine neoplasia type 1
- Hereditary multiple exostoses
- Nestor-Guillermo progeria syndrome
- Niemann–Pick disease
- nonsyndromic deafness
- porphyria
- Potocki–Shaffer syndrome
- Romano–Ward syndrome
- Sickle cell anemia
- Smith–Lemli–Opitz syndrome
- tetrahydrobiopterin deficiency
- Usher syndrome
- WAGR syndrome
- Wiedemann–Steiner syndrome
- Wilms' tumor
- Mosaic variegated aneuploidy syndrome

== Cytogenetic band ==
G-banding ideograms of human chromosome 11

G-banding ideogram of human chromosome 11 in resolution 850 bphs. Band length in this diagram is proportional to base-pair length. This type of ideogram is generally used in genome browsers (e.g. Ensembl, UCSC Genome Browser).

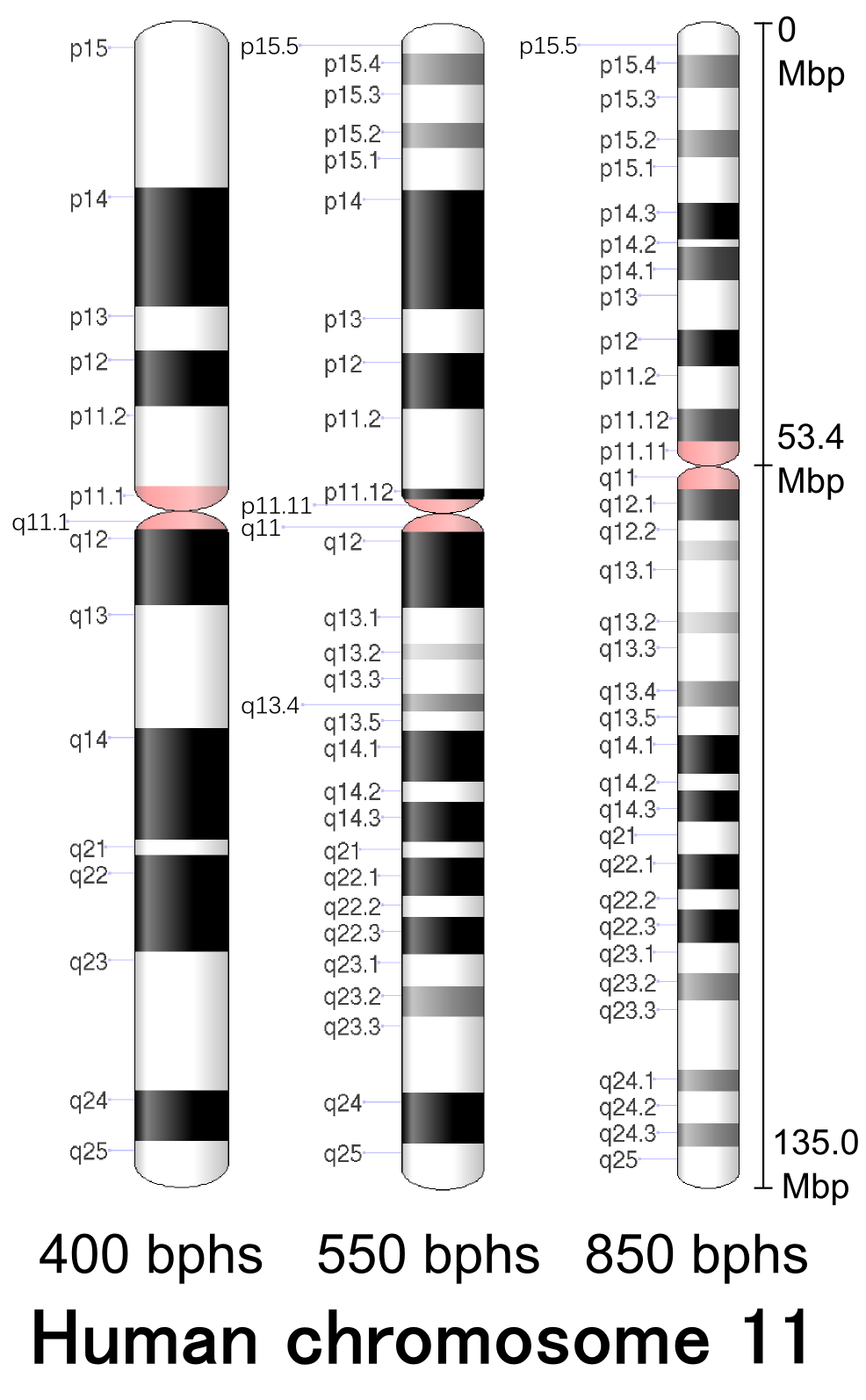
G-banding patterns of human chromosome 11 in three different resolutions (400, 550 and 850). Band length in this diagram is based on the ideograms from ISCN (2013). This type of ideogram represents actual relative band length observed under a microscope at the different moments during the mitotic process.

G-bands of human chromosome 11 in resolution 850 bphs
Chr.	Arm	Band	ISCN start	ISCN stop	Basepair start	Basepair stop	Stain	Density
11	p	15.5	0	230	1	2,800,000	gneg	
11	p	15.4	230	461	2,800,001	11,700,000	gpos	50
11	p	15.3	461	745	11,700,001	13,800,000	gneg	
11	p	15.2	745	935	13,800,001	16,900,000	gpos	50
11	p	15.1	935	1246	16,900,001	22,000,000	gneg	
11	p	14.3	1246	1490	22,000,001	26,200,000	gpos	100
11	p	14.2	1490	1545	26,200,001	27,200,000	gneg	
11	p	14.1	1545	1775	27,200,001	31,000,000	gpos	75
11	p	13	1775	2114	31,000,001	36,400,000	gneg	
11	p	12	2114	2357	36,400,001	43,400,000	gpos	100
11	p	11.2	2357	2655	43,400,001	48,800,000	gneg	
11	p	11.12	2655	2872	48,800,001	51,000,000	gpos	75
11	p	11.11	2872	3035	51,000,001	53,400,000	acen	
11	q	11	3035	3197	53,400,001	55,800,000	acen	
11	q	12.1	3197	3414	55,800,001	60,100,000	gpos	75
11	q	12.2	3414	3550	60,100,001	61,900,000	gneg	
11	q	12.3	3550	3685	61,900,001	63,600,000	gpos	25
11	q	13.1	3685	4037	63,600,001	66,100,000	gneg	
11	q	13.2	4037	4186	66,100,001	68,700,000	gpos	25
11	q	13.3	4186	4512	68,700,001	70,500,000	gneg	
11	q	13.4	4512	4688	70,500,001	75,500,000	gpos	50
11	q	13.5	4688	4877	75,500,001	77,400,000	gneg	
11	q	14.1	4877	5148	77,400,001	85,900,000	gpos	100
11	q	14.2	5148	5257	85,900,001	88,600,000	gneg	
11	q	14.3	5257	5474	88,600,001	93,000,000	gpos	100
11	q	21	5474	5690	93,000,001	97,400,000	gneg	
11	q	22.1	5690	5934	97,400,001	102,300,000	gpos	100
11	q	22.2	5934	6070	102,300,001	103,000,000	gneg	
11	q	22.3	6070	6300	103,000,001	110,600,000	gpos	100
11	q	23.1	6300	6503	110,600,001	112,700,000	gneg	
11	q	23.2	6503	6693	112,700,001	114,600,000	gpos	50
11	q	23.3	6693	7167	114,600,001	121,300,000	gneg	
11	q	24.1	7167	7316	121,300,001	124,000,000	gpos	50
11	q	24.2	7316	7533	124,000,001	127,900,000	gneg	
11	q	24.3	7533	7695	127,900,001	130,900,000	gpos	50
11	q	25	7695	7980	130,900,001	135,086,622	gneg	
