= RNH =

RHN could mean:

- Royal Naval Hospital, a hospital operated by the British Royal Navy
- Ryan Nugent-Hopkins, ice hockey player
- Ribonuclease H, a family of endonuclease enzymes
- RNH1, Ribonuclease inhibitor, human gene
- New Richmond Regional Airport, IATA code: RNH
