= Uroplakin-2 =

UPK2

Identifiers
- Aliases: UPK2, UP2, UPII, uroplakin 2
- External IDs: OMIM: 611558; MGI: 98913; HomoloGene: 4920; GeneCards: UPK2; OMA:UPK2 - orthologs

Gene location (Human)
Chr.	Chromosome 11 (human)
Band	11q23.3	Start	118,925,164 bp
Band	11q23.3	End	118,958,559 bp

Gene location (Mouse)
Chr.	Chromosome 9 (mouse)
Band	9 A5.2|9 24.84 cM	Start	44,364,012 bp
Band	9 A5.2|9 24.84 cM	End	44,366,273 bp
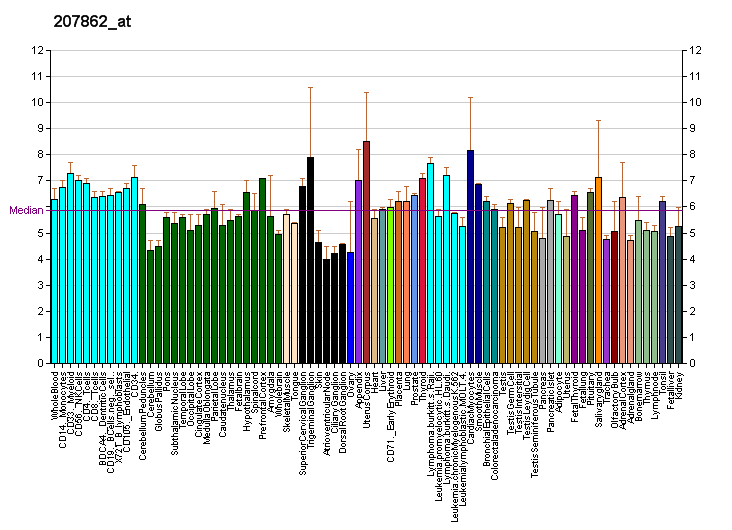
RNA expression pattern
Bgee	Human / Mouse (ortholog); Top expressed in: urinary bladder; ganglionic eminence; nucleus accumbens; mucosa of urinary bladder; cingulate gyrus; anterior cingulate cortex; ventricular zone; stromal cell of endometrium; putamen; caudate nucleus / Top expressed in: transitional epithelium of urinary bladder; humerus; Meckel's cartilage; sphenoid bone; fetal liver hematopoietic progenitor cell; rib; lesser wing of sphenoid bone; seminal vesicula; basisphenoid; lobe of prostate; More reference expression data
BioGPS	More reference expression data
Gene ontology
Molecular function	protein binding
Cellular component	integral component of membrane; plasma membrane; integral component of plasma membrane; extracellular exosome; apical plasma membrane; membrane
Biological process	multicellular organism development; epithelial cell differentiation
Sources:Amigo / QuickGO
Orthologs
Species	Human	Mouse
Entrez	7379	22269
Ensembl	ENSG00000110375	ENSMUSG00000041523
UniProt	O00526	P38575; Q3SXK0
RefSeq (mRNA)	NM_006760	NM_009476
RefSeq (protein)	NP_006751	NP_033502
Location (UCSC)	Chr 11: 118.93 – 118.96 Mb	Chr 9: 44.36 – 44.37 Mb
PubMed search
- Wikidata
View/Edit Human	View/Edit Mouse

Uroplakin-2 (UP2) is a protein that in humans is encoded by the UPK2 gene.
