= COMMD9 =

Protein-coding gene in humans

Identifiers
- Aliases: COMMD9, HSPC166, COMM domain containing 9, C11orf55, LINC00610
- External IDs: OMIM: 612299; MGI: 1923751; GeneCards: COMMD9
Available structures
PDB	Ortholog search: PDBe RCSB
PDB	List of PDB id codes 4NKN, 4OE9

Gene location (Human)
Chr.	Chromosome 11 (human)
Band	11p13	Start	36,269,284 bp
Band	11p13	End	36,289,449 bp

Gene location (Mouse)
Chr.	Chromosome 2 (mouse)
Band	2|2 E2	Start	101,716,592 bp
Band	2|2 E2	End	101,731,991 bp
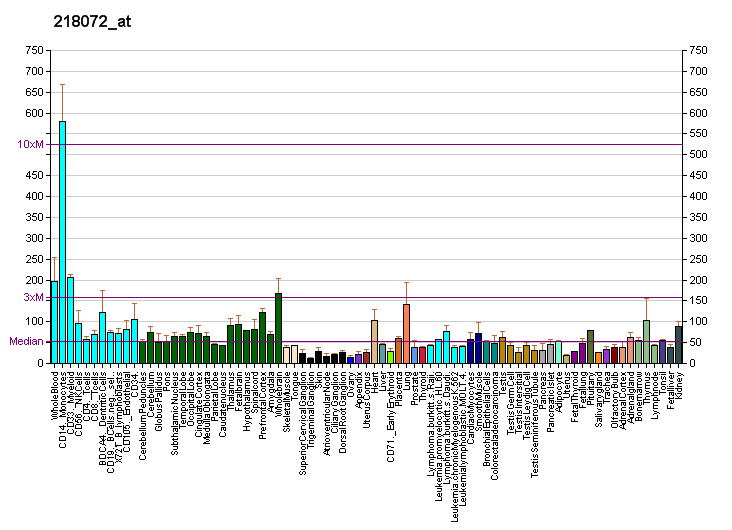
RNA expression pattern
Bgee	Human / Mouse (ortholog); Top expressed in: muscle of thigh; prefrontal cortex; monocyte; granulocyte; islet of Langerhans; C1 segment; anterior cingulate cortex; right adrenal gland; ganglionic eminence; right frontal lobe / Top expressed in: yolk sac; muscle of thigh; right kidney; lip; masseter muscle; ventricular zone; proximal tubule; ganglionic eminence; neural tube; skeletal muscle tissue; More reference expression data
BioGPS	More reference expression data
Gene ontology
Molecular function	protein binding
Cellular component	cytoplasmic vesicle; extracellular region; nucleus; Golgi apparatus; cytosol; secretory granule lumen; ficolin-1-rich granule lumen
Biological process	regulation of transcription, DNA-templated; ion transport; transcription, DNA-templated; sodium ion transport; neutrophil degranulation; cholesterol homeostasis
Sources:Amigo / QuickGO
Orthologs
Databases	NCBI: entry; OMA: entry
Species	Human	Mouse
Entrez	29099	76501
Ensembl	ENSG00000110442	ENSMUSG00000027163
UniProt	Q9P000	Q8K2Q0
RefSeq (mRNA)	NM_001101653; NM_001307932; NM_001307937; NM_014186; NM_207428	NM_029635
RefSeq (protein)	NP_001095123; NP_001294861; NP_001294866; NP_054905	NP_083911
Location (UCSC)	Chr 11: 36.27 – 36.29 Mb	Chr 2: 101.72 – 101.73 Mb
PubMed search
- Wikidata
View/Edit Human	View/Edit Mouse

COMM domain-containing protein 9 is a protein that in humans is encoded by the COMMD9 gene.
