= TBRG1 =

Protein-coding gene in the species Homo sapiens

Available structures
PDB	Ortholog search: PDBe RCSB
PDB	List of PDB id codes 2WZO

Identifiers
- Aliases: TBRG1, NIAM, TB-5, transforming growth factor beta regulator 1
- External IDs: OMIM: 610614; MGI: 1100877; HomoloGene: 18102; GeneCards: TBRG1; OMA:TBRG1 - orthologs

Gene location (Human)
Chr.	Chromosome 11 (human)
Band	11q24.2	Start	124,622,836 bp
Band	11q24.2	End	124,635,926 bp

Gene location (Mouse)
Chr.	Chromosome 9 (mouse)
Band	9|9 A4	Start	37,560,059 bp
Band	9|9 A4	End	37,568,608 bp
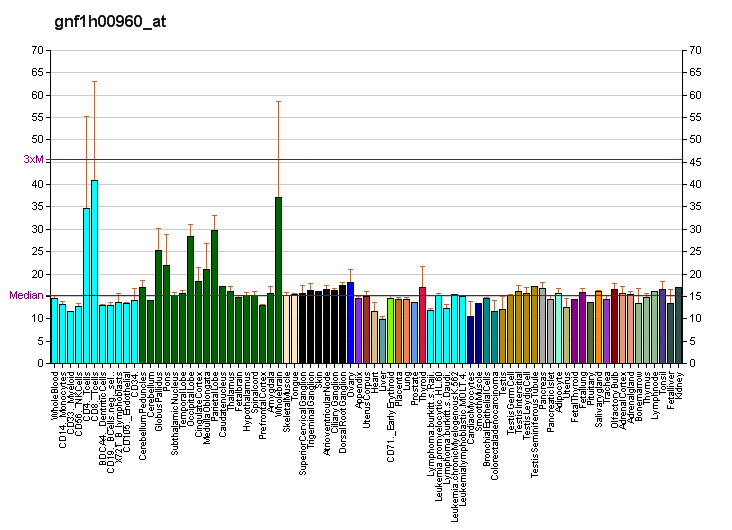

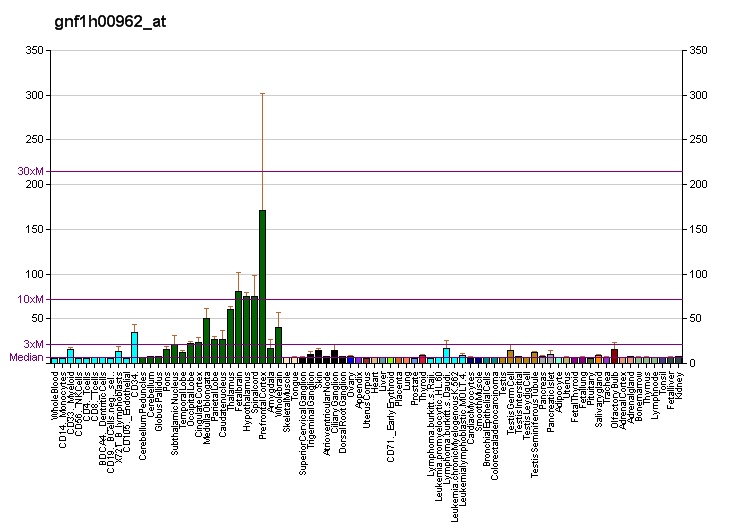
RNA expression pattern
Bgee	Human / Mouse (ortholog); Top expressed in: granulocyte; gastric mucosa; rectum; monocyte; right lung; appendix; body of pancreas; spleen; tibia; prefrontal cortex / Top expressed in: dermis; endocardial cushion; Gonadal ridge; decidua; seminal vesicula; yolk sac; tooth; molar; migratory enteric neural crest cell; skin of external ear; More reference expression data
BioGPS	More reference expression data
Gene ontology
Molecular function	protein binding
Cellular component	nucleus
Biological process	DNA replication; cell cycle; protein stabilization; negative regulation of cell population proliferation; protein localization to nucleoplasm
Sources:Amigo / QuickGO
Orthologs
Species	Human	Mouse
Entrez	84897	21376
Ensembl	ENSG00000154144	ENSMUSG00000011114
UniProt	Q3YBR2	Q3UB74
RefSeq (mRNA)	NM_032811	NM_025289
RefSeq (protein)	NP_116200	NP_079565
Location (UCSC)	Chr 11: 124.62 – 124.64 Mb	Chr 9: 37.56 – 37.57 Mb
PubMed search
- Wikidata
View/Edit Human	View/Edit Mouse

Transforming growth factor beta regulator 1 is a protein that in humans is encoded by the TBRG1 gene.
