= MADD (gene) =

Protein-coding gene in the species Homo sapiens

Identifiers
- Aliases: MADD, DENN, IG20, RAB3GEP, MAP kinase activating death domain
- External IDs: OMIM: 603584; MGI: 2444672; GeneCards: MADD

Gene location (Human)
Chr.	Chromosome 11 (human)
Band	11p11.2	Start	47,269,161 bp
Band	11p11.2	End	47,330,031 bp

Gene location (Mouse)
Chr.	Chromosome 2 (mouse)
Band	2|2 E1	Start	91,137,360 bp
Band	2|2 E1	End	91,183,837 bp
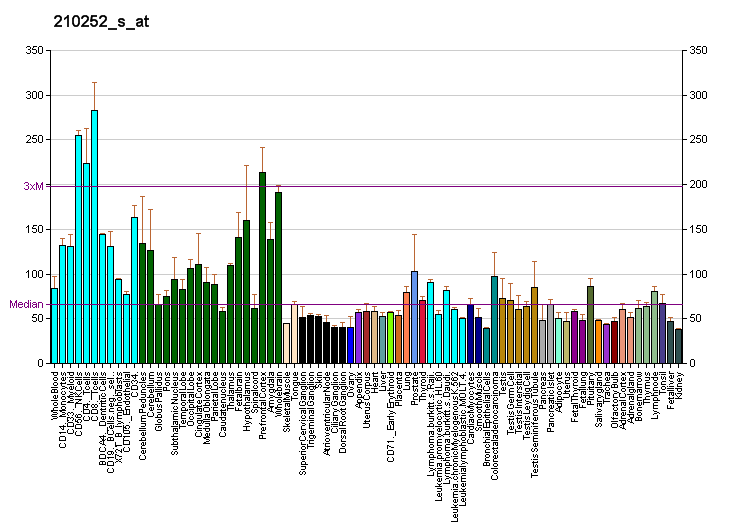

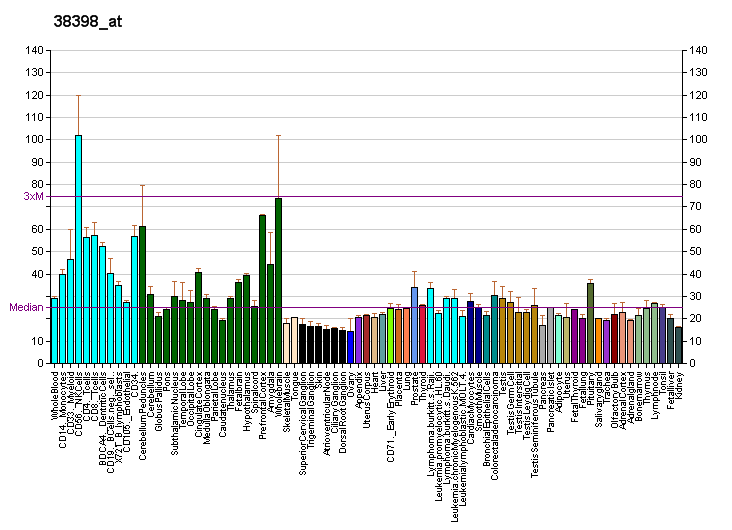
RNA expression pattern
Bgee	Human / Mouse (ortholog); Top expressed in: right hemisphere of cerebellum; right frontal lobe; anterior pituitary; Brodmann area 9; prefrontal cortex; apex of heart; cingulate gyrus; left testis; anterior cingulate cortex; right testis / Top expressed in: neural layer of retina; dentate gyrus of hippocampal formation granule cell; superior frontal gyrus; cerebellar cortex; primary visual cortex; supraoptic nucleus; nucleus of stria terminalis; Region I of hippocampus proper; lobe of cerebellum; medial dorsal nucleus; More reference expression data
BioGPS	More reference expression data
Gene ontology
Molecular function	death receptor binding; guanyl-nucleotide exchange factor activity; protein kinase activator activity; protein binding
Cellular component	integral component of membrane; membrane; plasma membrane; cytoplasm; cytosol
Biological process	regulation of apoptotic process; regulation of extrinsic apoptotic signaling pathway; execution phase of apoptosis; regulation of tumor necrosis factor-mediated signaling pathway; regulation of Rab protein signal transduction; regulation of cell cycle; cell surface receptor signaling pathway; regulation of extrinsic apoptotic signaling pathway via death domain receptors; apoptotic process
Sources:Amigo / QuickGO
Orthologs
Databases	NCBI: entry; OMA: entry
Species	Human	Mouse
Entrez	8567	228355
Ensembl	ENSG00000110514	ENSMUSG00000040687
UniProt	Q8WXG6	Q80U28
RefSeq (mRNA)	NM_001135943; NM_001135944; NM_003682; NM_130470; NM_130471 NM_130472; NM_130473; NM_130474; NM_130475; NM_130476	NM_001177719; NM_001177720; NM_001177721; NM_001177722; NM_001177723 NM_001177724; NM_001177725; NM_001177726; NM_001177727; NM_001177728; NM_001177729; NM_145527
RefSeq (protein)	NP_001129415; NP_001129416; NP_003673; NP_569826; NP_569827 NP_569828; NP_569829; NP_569830; NP_569831; NP_569832; NP_001363500; NP_001363501; NP_001363502; NP_001363503; NP_001363504; NP_001363505; NP_001363506; NP_001363507; NP_001363508; NP_001363509; NP_001363510; NP_001363511; NP_001363512; NP_001363513; NP_001363514; NP_001363515; NP_001363522; NP_001363523; NP_001363524; NP_001363525; NP_001363526; NP_001363527; NP_001363528; NP_001363529; NP_001363530; NP_001363531; NP_001363532; NP_001363533; NP_001363534; NP_001363535; NP_001363536; NP_001363537; NP_001363538; NP_001363539; NP_001363540; NP_001363541; NP_001363542; NP_001363543; NP_001363544; NP_001363545; NP_001363546; NP_001363547; NP_001363548; NP_001363549; NP_001363550; NP_001363551; NP_001363552; NP_001363553; NP_001363554; NP_001363555; NP_001363556; NP_001363557; NP_001363558; NP_001363559; NP_001363560; NP_001363561; NP_001363562; NP_001363563; NP_001363564; NP_001363565; NP_001363566; NP_001363567; NP_001363568; NP_001363569; NP_001363570; NP_001363571; NP_001363572; NP_001363573; NP_001363574; NP_001363575; NP_001363576; NP_001363577; NP_001363578; NP_001363579; NP_001363580; NP_001363581; NP_001363582; NP_001363583; NP_001363584; NP_001363585; NP_001363586; NP_001363587; NP_001363588; NP_001363589; NP_001363590; NP_001363591; NP_001363592	NP_001171190; NP_001171191; NP_663502
Location (UCSC)	Chr 11: 47.27 – 47.33 Mb	Chr 2: 91.14 – 91.18 Mb
PubMed search
- Wikidata
View/Edit Human	View/Edit Mouse

MAP kinase-activating death domain protein is an enzyme that in humans is encoded by the MADD gene. MADD is one out of four of the splice variants of the human IG20 (insulinoma-glucagonoma clone 20) gene which is located on human chromosome 11.

Tumor necrosis factor alpha (TNF-alpha) is a signaling molecule that interacts with one of two receptors on cells targeted for apoptosis. The apoptotic signal is transduced inside these cells by cytoplasmic adaptor proteins. The protein encoded by this gene is a death domain-containing adaptor protein that interacts with the death domain of TNF-alpha receptor 1 to activate mitogen-activated protein kinase (MAPK) and propagate the apoptotic signal. It is membrane-bound and expressed at a higher level in neoplastic cells than in normal cells. Several transcript variants encoding different isoforms have been described for this gene. MADD is mostly expressed in the cell membrane with some cytoplasmic expression in human cells.
