= AlkB homolog 3, alpha-ketoglutarate-dependent dioxygenase =

Protein-coding gene in the species Homo sapiens

ALKBH3

Identifiers
- Aliases: ALKBH3, ABH3, DEPC-1, DEPC1, PCA1, hABH3, alkB homolog 3, alpha-ketoglutarate-dependent dioxygenase, alkB homolog 3, alpha-ketoglutaratedependent dioxygenase, alkB homolog 3, alpha-ketoglutarate dependent dioxygenase
- External IDs: OMIM: 610603; MGI: 1916363; GeneCards: ALKBH3
Available structures
PDB	Ortholog search: PDBe RCSB
PDB	List of PDB id codes 2IUW
Enzyme activity
EC #	BRENDA	ExPASy	KEGG	MetaCyc
1.14.11.33	↗	↗	↗	↗
1.14.11.54	↗	↗	↗	↗

Gene location (Human)
Chr.	Chromosome 11 (human)
Band	11p11.2	Start	43,880,811 bp
Band	11p11.2	End	43,920,274 bp

Gene location (Mouse)
Chr.	Chromosome 2 (mouse)
Band	2|2 E1	Start	93,810,895 bp
Band	2|2 E1	End	93,841,152 bp
RNA expression pattern
Bgee	Human / Mouse (ortholog); Top expressed in: right uterine tube; Achilles tendon; muscle of thigh; gonad; gastrocnemius muscle; stromal cell of endometrium; islet of Langerhans; body of pancreas; skin of leg; left ovary / Top expressed in: interventricular septum; seminiferous tubule; muscle of thigh; gastrocnemius muscle; soleus muscle; medial head of gastrocnemius muscle; triceps brachii muscle; lumbar spinal ganglion; skeletal muscle tissue; vastus lateralis muscle; More reference expression data
BioGPS	n/a
Gene ontology
Molecular function	protein binding; L-ascorbic acid binding; dioxygenase activity; metal ion binding; DNA-N1-methyladenine dioxygenase activity; oxidoreductase activity; ferrous iron binding; mRNA N1-methyladenosine dioxygenase activity; 2-oxoglutarate-dependent dioxygenase activity; cytosine C-5 DNA demethylase activity
Cellular component	nucleus; mitochondrion; nucleoplasm; cytoplasm; cytosol
Biological process	cell population proliferation; cellular response to DNA damage stimulus; DNA dealkylation involved in DNA repair; oxidative single-stranded DNA demethylation; oxidative single-stranded RNA demethylation; DNA repair
Sources:Amigo / QuickGO
Orthologs
Databases	NCBI: entry; OMA: entry
Species	Human	Mouse
Entrez	221120	69113
Ensembl	ENSG00000166199	ENSMUSG00000040174
UniProt	Q96Q83	Q8K1E6
RefSeq (mRNA)	NM_139178	NM_026944
RefSeq (protein)	NP_631917	NP_081220
Location (UCSC)	Chr 11: 43.88 – 43.92 Mb	Chr 2: 93.81 – 93.84 Mb
PubMed search
- Wikidata
View/Edit Human	View/Edit Mouse

AlkB homolog 3, alpha-ketoglutarate-dependent dioxygenase is a protein that in humans is encoded by the ALKBH3 gene.

== Function ==
The Escherichia coli AlkB protein protects against the cytotoxicity of methylating agents by repair of the specific DNA lesions generated in single-stranded DNA. ALKBH2 (MIM 610602) and ALKBH3 are E. coli AlkB homologs that catalyze the removal of 1-methyladenine and 3-methylcytosine (Duncan et al., 2002 [PubMed 12486230]).
