= SAC3D1 =

Protein-coding gene in the species Homo sapiens

Identifiers
- Aliases: SAC3D1, HSU79266, SHD1, SAC3 domain containing 1
- External IDs: MGI: 1913656; HomoloGene: 40867; GeneCards: SAC3D1; OMA:SAC3D1 - orthologs

Gene location (Human)
Chr.	Chromosome 11 (human)
Band	11q13.1	Start	65,040,901 bp
Band	11q13.1	End	65,044,828 bp

Gene location (Mouse)
Chr.	Chromosome 19 (mouse)
Band	19|19 A	Start	6,166,030 bp
Band	19|19 A	End	6,168,680 bp
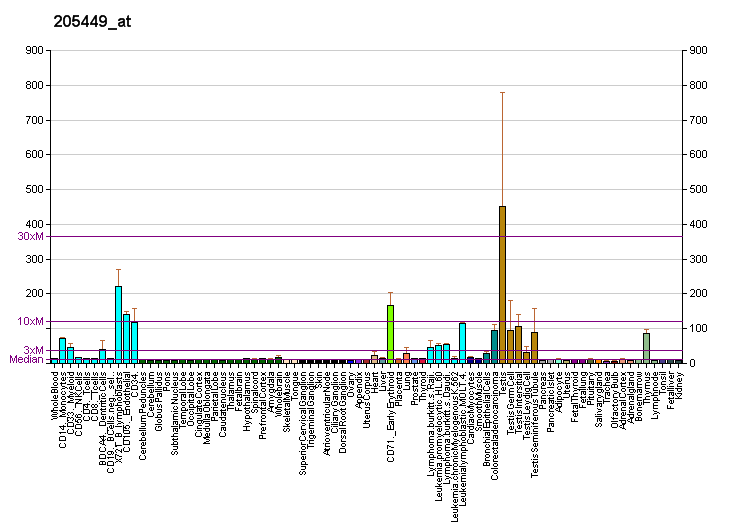
RNA expression pattern
Bgee	Human / Mouse (ortholog); Top expressed in: right testis; left testis; tendon of biceps brachii; gingival epithelium; sperm; mucosa of transverse colon; internal globus pallidus; gonad; amniotic fluid; palpebral conjunctiva / Top expressed in: embryo; embryo; external carotid artery; fetal liver hematopoietic progenitor cell; internal carotid artery; epiblast; neural tube; proximal tubule; medial ganglionic eminence; right kidney; More reference expression data
BioGPS	More reference expression data
Gene ontology
Molecular function	protein binding
Cellular component	cytoplasm; microtubule organizing center; spindle; cytoskeleton; nucleus; centrosome
Biological process	cell cycle; cell division; spindle assembly; centrosome duplication
Sources:Amigo / QuickGO
Orthologs
Species	Human	Mouse
Entrez	29901	66406
Ensembl	ENSG00000168061	ENSMUSG00000024790
UniProt	A6NKF1	A6H687
RefSeq (mRNA)	NM_013299	NM_133678
RefSeq (protein)	NP_037431; NP_001354414; NP_001354415; NP_001354416; NP_001354417	NP_598439
Location (UCSC)	Chr 11: 65.04 – 65.04 Mb	Chr 19: 6.17 – 6.17 Mb
PubMed search
- Wikidata
View/Edit Human	View/Edit Mouse

SAC3 domain-containing protein 1 is a protein that in humans is encoded by the SAC3D1 gene.
