= Glycine-N-acyltransferase like 2 =

Protein-coding gene in the species Homo sapiens

GLYATL2

Identifiers
- Aliases: GLYATL2, BXMAS2-10, GATF-B, glycine-N-acyltransferase like 2
- External IDs: OMIM: 614762; GeneCards: GLYATL2
Enzyme activity
EC #	BRENDA	ExPASy	KEGG	MetaCyc
2.3.1.13	↗	↗	↗	↗

Gene location (Human)
Chr.	Chromosome 11 (human)
Band	11q12.1	Start	58,834,065 bp
Band	11q12.1	End	58,904,215 bp
RNA expression pattern
Bgee	Human / Mouse (ortholog); Top expressed in: minor salivary glands; gallbladder; ventricular zone; ganglionic eminence; gonad; olfactory zone of nasal mucosa; Achilles tendon; C1 segment; monocyte; skin of hip / n/a; More reference expression data
BioGPS	n/a
Gene ontology
Molecular function	transferase activity; acyltransferase activity; glycine N-acyltransferase activity
Cellular component	mitochondrion; endoplasmic reticulum
Biological process	long-chain fatty acid catabolic process; medium-chain fatty acid catabolic process; monounsaturated fatty acid catabolic process
Sources:Amigo / QuickGO
Orthologs
Databases	NCBI: entry; OMA: entry
Species	Human	Mouse
Entrez	219970	n/a
Ensembl	ENSG00000156689	n/a
UniProt	Q8WU03	n/a
RefSeq (mRNA)	NM_145016	n/a
RefSeq (protein)	NP_659453	n/a
Location (UCSC)	Chr 11: 58.83 – 58.9 Mb	n/a
PubMed search		n/a
- Wikidata
View/Edit Human

Glycine-N-acyltransferase like 2 is a protein that in humans is encoded by the GLYATL2 gene.
