= ZNF408 =

Protein-coding gene in the species Homo sapiens

Identifiers
- Aliases: ZNF408, EVR6, RP72, zinc finger protein 408
- External IDs: OMIM: 616454; MGI: 2685857; GeneCards: ZNF408

Gene location (Human)
Chr.	Chromosome 11 (human)
Band	11p11.2	Start	46,701,030 bp
Band	11p11.2	End	46,705,912 bp

Gene location (Mouse)
Chr.	Chromosome 2 (mouse)
Band	2|2 E1	Start	91,474,014 bp
Band	2|2 E1	End	91,480,136 bp
RNA expression pattern
Bgee	Human / Mouse (ortholog); Top expressed in: endothelial cell; tendon of biceps brachii; granulocyte; amniotic fluid; right lobe of liver; mucosa of transverse colon; gonad; thymus; parotid gland; sural nerve / Top expressed in: otic vesicle; granulocyte; ascending aorta; otolith organ; genital tubercle; utricle; cumulus cell; tail of embryo; aortic valve; supraoptic nucleus; More reference expression data
BioGPS	n/a
Gene ontology
Molecular function	DNA binding; protein binding; metal ion binding; identical protein binding; nucleic acid binding; DNA-binding transcription factor activity, RNA polymerase II-specific
Cellular component	nucleus
Biological process	regulation of transcription, DNA-templated; transcription, DNA-templated; regulation of transcription by RNA polymerase II
Sources:Amigo / QuickGO
Orthologs
Databases	NCBI: entry; OMA: entry
Species	Human	Mouse
Entrez	79797	381410
Ensembl	ENSG00000175213	ENSMUSG00000075040
UniProt	Q9H9D4	n/a
RefSeq (mRNA)	NM_024741; NM_001184751	NM_001033451; NM_001347175
RefSeq (protein)	NP_001171680; NP_079017	n/a
Location (UCSC)	Chr 11: 46.7 – 46.71 Mb	Chr 2: 91.47 – 91.48 Mb
PubMed search
- Wikidata
View/Edit Human	View/Edit Mouse

Zinc finger protein 408 is a protein that in humans is encoded by the ZNF408 gene.
