= Olfactory receptor family 2 subfamily AG member 2 =

Protein-coding gene in the species Homo sapiens

OR2AG2

Identifiers
- Aliases: OR2AG2, OR11-76, OR2AG2P, olfactory receptor family 2 subfamily AG member 2
- External IDs: MGI: 3030535; GeneCards: OR2AG2

Gene location (Human)
Chr.	Chromosome 11 (human)
Band	11p15.4	Start	6,765,626 bp
Band	11p15.4	End	6,771,976 bp

Gene location (Mouse)
Chr.	Chromosome 7 (mouse)
Band	7|7 E3	Start	106,413,336 bp
Band	7|7 E3	End	106,420,679 bp
RNA expression pattern
Bgee	Human / Mouse (ortholog); Top expressed in: testicle; gonad; prefrontal cortex; duodenum; primary visual cortex; urinary bladder; appendix; muscle tissue; olfactory zone of nasal mucosa; islet of Langerhans / Top expressed in: spermatid; olfactory epithelium; zygote; lumbar subsegment of spinal cord; seminiferous tubule; lumbar spinal ganglion; oocyte; gastrula; primary oocyte; secondary oocyte; More reference expression data
BioGPS	n/a
Gene ontology
Molecular function	G protein-coupled receptor activity; olfactory receptor activity; signal transducer activity
Cellular component	integral component of membrane; plasma membrane; membrane
Biological process	sensory perception of smell; signal transduction; response to stimulus; detection of chemical stimulus involved in sensory perception of smell; G protein-coupled receptor signaling pathway
Sources:Amigo / QuickGO
Orthologs
Databases	NCBI: entry; OMA: entry
Species	Human	Mouse
Entrez	338755	66786
Ensembl	ENSG00000188124	ENSMUSG00000036744
UniProt	A6NM03	n/a
RefSeq (mRNA)	NM_001004490; NM_001386053	NM_028910; NM_001360747
RefSeq (protein)	NP_001004490	n/a
Location (UCSC)	Chr 11: 6.77 – 6.77 Mb	Chr 7: 106.41 – 106.42 Mb
PubMed search
- Wikidata
View/Edit Human	View/Edit Mouse

Olfactory receptor family 2 subfamily AG member 2 is a protein that in humans is encoded by the OR2AG2 gene.

== Function ==
Olfactory receptors interact with odorant molecules in the nose, to initiate a neuronal response that triggers the perception of a smell. The olfactory receptor proteins are members of a large family of G-protein-coupled receptors (GPCR) arising from single coding-exon genes. Olfactory receptors share a 7-transmembrane domain structure with many neurotransmitter and hormone receptors and are responsible for the recognition and G protein-mediated transduction of odorant signals. The olfactory receptor gene family is the largest in the genome. The nomenclature assigned to the olfactory receptor genes and proteins for this organism is independent of other organisms. [provided by RefSeq, Jul 2008].
