= Keratin associated protein 5-6 =

Protein-coding gene in the species Homo sapiens

KRTAP5-6

Identifiers
- Aliases: KRTAP5-6, KRTAP5.6, keratin associated protein 5-6
- External IDs: GeneCards: KRTAP5-6

Gene location (Human)
| Chr. | Chromosome 11 (human) |
| Band | 11p15.5 | Start | 1,697,195 bp |
| Band | 11p15.5 | End | 1,697,755 bp |
RNA expression pattern
| Bgee | Human / Mouse (ortholog); Top expressed in: right lobe of liver; placenta; stromal cell of endometrium; ventricular zone; ganglionic eminence; gallbladder; C1 segment; prefrontal cortex; lymph node; skin of leg / n/a; More reference expression data |
| BioGPS | n/a |
Gene ontology
| Molecular function | protein binding |
| Cellular component | intermediate filament; cytosol; keratin filament |
| Biological process | keratinization |
Sources:Amigo / QuickGO
Orthologs
| Databases | NCBI: entry; OMA: entry |
| Species | Human | Mouse |
| Entrez | 440023 | n/a |
| Ensembl | ENSG00000205864; ENSG00000277389 | n/a |
| UniProt | Q6L8G9 | n/a |
| RefSeq (mRNA) | NM_001012416 | n/a |
| RefSeq (protein) | NP_001012416 | n/a |
| Location (UCSC) | Chr 11: 1.7 – 1.7 Mb | n/a |
| PubMed search | | n/a |
- Wikidata
| View/Edit Human |

Keratin associated protein 5-6 is a protein that in humans is encoded by the KRTAP5-6 gene.
