= Claudin 25 =

Protein-coding gene in the species Homo sapiens

CLDN25

Identifiers
- Aliases: CLDN25, claudin 25
- External IDs: GeneCards: CLDN25

Gene location (Human)
Chr.	Chromosome 11 (human)
Band	11q23.2	Start	113,779,796 bp
Band	11q23.2	End	113,780,485 bp
RNA expression pattern
Bgee	Human / Mouse (ortholog); Top expressed in: olfactory zone of nasal mucosa; anterior pituitary; skeletal muscle tissue; muscle of leg; gastrocnemius muscle / n/a; More reference expression data
BioGPS	n/a
Orthologs
Databases	NCBI: entry; OMA: entry
Species	Human	Mouse
Entrez	644672	n/a
Ensembl	ENSG00000228607	n/a
UniProt	C9JDP6	n/a
RefSeq (mRNA)	NM_001101389	n/a
RefSeq (protein)	NP_001094859	n/a
Location (UCSC)	Chr 11: 113.78 – 113.78 Mb	n/a
PubMed search		n/a
- Wikidata
View/Edit Human

Claudin 25 is a protein that in humans is encoded by the CLDN25 gene.

== Function ==
This gene encodes a member of the claudin family. Claudins are integral membrane proteins and components of tight junction strands. Tight junction strands serve as a physical barrier to prevent solutes and water from passing freely through the paracellular space between epithelial or endothelial cell sheets, and also play critical roles in maintaining cell polarity and signal transductions. [provided by RefSeq, Jun 2010].
