= NFRKB =

Protein-coding gene in the species Homo sapiens

Identifiers
- Aliases: NFRKB, INO80G, nuclear factor related to kappaB binding protein
- External IDs: OMIM: 164013; MGI: 2442410; GeneCards: NFRKB
Available structures
PDB	Ortholog search: PDBe RCSB
PDB	List of PDB id codes 3U21, 4UF6, 4WLP

Gene location (Human)
Chr.	Chromosome 11 (human)
Band	11q24.3	Start	129,863,636 bp
Band	11q24.3	End	129,895,590 bp

Gene location (Mouse)
Chr.	Chromosome 9 (mouse)
Band	9|9 A4	Start	31,297,488 bp
Band	9|9 A4	End	31,332,629 bp
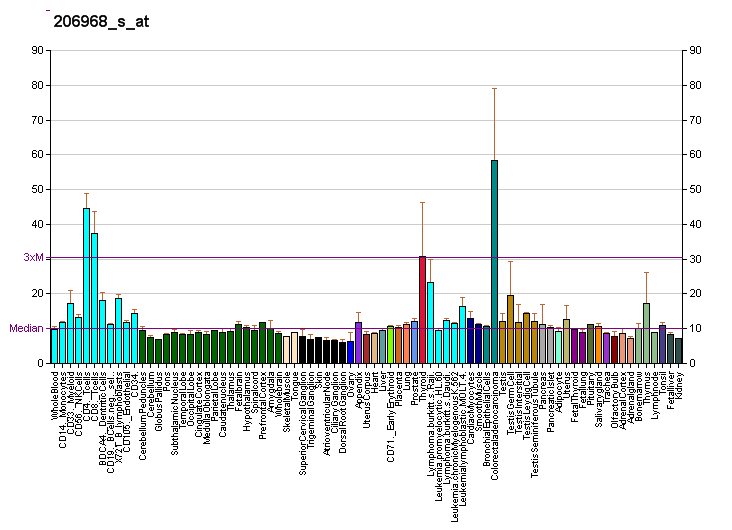

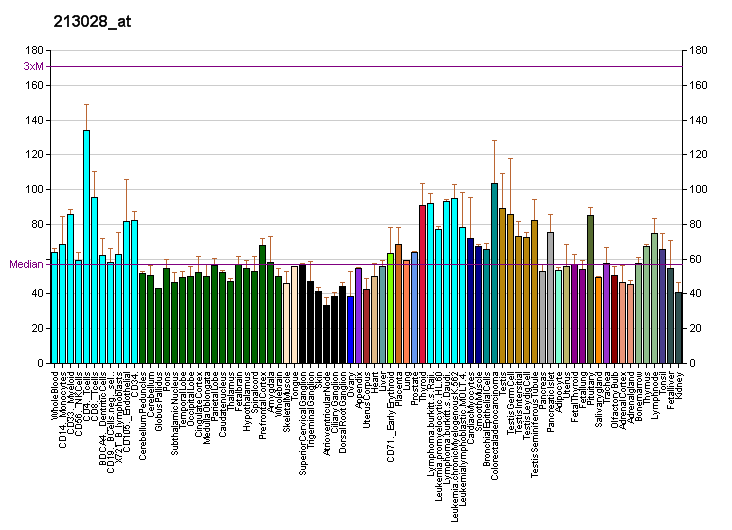
RNA expression pattern
Bgee	Human / Mouse (ortholog); Top expressed in: buccal mucosa cell; secondary oocyte; testicle; endothelial cell; left lobe of thyroid gland; right uterine tube; right lobe of thyroid gland; gonad; skin of leg; left ovary / Top expressed in: secondary oocyte; superior cervical ganglion; primary oocyte; hand; otolith organ; zygote; utricle; medullary collecting duct; spermatocyte; thymus; More reference expression data
BioGPS	More reference expression data
Gene ontology
Molecular function	protease binding; DNA binding; protein binding
Cellular component	nucleus; Ino80 complex; nucleoplasm
Biological process	DNA recombination; inflammatory response; regulation of transcription, DNA-templated; transcription by RNA polymerase II; DNA repair; transcription, DNA-templated; cellular response to DNA damage stimulus; protein deubiquitination
Sources:Amigo / QuickGO
Orthologs
Databases	NCBI: entry; OMA: entry
Species	Human	Mouse
Entrez	4798	235134
Ensembl	ENSG00000170322	ENSMUSG00000042185
UniProt	Q6P4R8	Q6PIJ4
RefSeq (mRNA)	NM_001143835; NM_006165	NM_172766; NM_001359654
RefSeq (protein)	NP_001137307; NP_006156; NP_001137307.1	NP_766354; NP_001346583; NP_001392026; NP_001392027; NP_001392028 NP_001392030; NP_001392031
Location (UCSC)	Chr 11: 129.86 – 129.9 Mb	Chr 9: 31.3 – 31.33 Mb
PubMed search
- Wikidata
View/Edit Human	View/Edit Mouse

Nuclear factor related to kappa-B-binding protein is a protein that in humans is encoded by the NFRKB gene.
