= LPXN =

Protein-coding gene in the species Homo sapiens

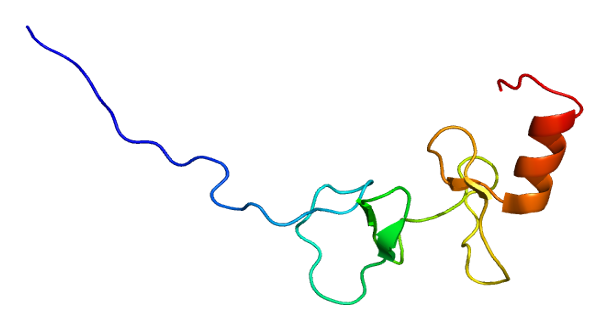

Identifiers
- Aliases: LPXN, LDPL, leupaxin
- External IDs: OMIM: 605390; MGI: 2147677; GeneCards: LPXN
Available structures
PDB	Ortholog search: PDBe RCSB
PDB	List of PDB id codes 1X3H, 4XEF, 4XEK, 4XEV

Gene location (Human)
Chr.	Chromosome 11 (human)
Band	11q12.1	Start	58,526,871 bp
Band	11q12.1	End	58,578,220 bp

Gene location (Mouse)
Chr.	Chromosome 19 (mouse)
Band	19|19 A	Start	12,773,557 bp
Band	19|19 A	End	12,811,171 bp
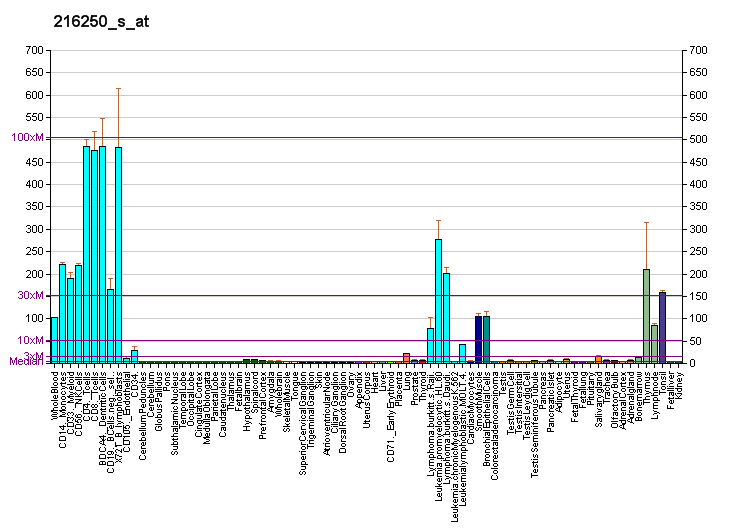
RNA expression pattern
Bgee	Human / Mouse (ortholog); Top expressed in: thymus; granulocyte; mononuclear cell; monocyte; appendix; lymph node; blood; spleen; mucosa of ileum; epithelium of nasopharynx / Top expressed in: mesenteric lymph nodes; spermatocyte; stroma of bone marrow; spleen; thymus; seminiferous tubule; blood; spermatid; medulla of thymus; subcutaneous adipose tissue; More reference expression data
BioGPS	More reference expression data
Gene ontology
Molecular function	protein binding; transcription coregulator activity; metal ion binding
Cellular component	cytoplasm; perinuclear region of cytoplasm; podosome; cell junction; plasma membrane; cell projection; nucleus; focal adhesion; membrane; cytosol; nuclear speck
Biological process	negative regulation of B cell receptor signaling pathway; negative regulation of cell adhesion; cell adhesion; regulation of cell adhesion mediated by integrin; regulation of transcription, DNA-templated; transcription, DNA-templated; signal transduction; protein-containing complex assembly; regulation of nucleic acid-templated transcription
Sources:Amigo / QuickGO
Orthologs
Databases	NCBI: entry; OMA: entry
Species	Human	Mouse
Entrez	9404	107321
Ensembl	ENSG00000110031	ENSMUSG00000024696
UniProt	O60711	Q99N69
RefSeq (mRNA)	NM_001143995; NM_001307951; NM_004811	NM_134152; NM_001361971
RefSeq (protein)	NP_001137467; NP_001294880; NP_004802	NP_598913; NP_001348900
Location (UCSC)	Chr 11: 58.53 – 58.58 Mb	Chr 19: 12.77 – 12.81 Mb
PubMed search
- Wikidata
View/Edit Human	View/Edit Mouse

Leupaxin is a protein that in humans is encoded by the LPXN gene.

The product encoded by this gene is preferentially expressed in hematopoietic cells and is most homologous to the focal adhesion protein, paxillin. It may function in cell type-specific signaling by associating with PYK2, a member of focal adhesion kinase family. As a substrate for a tyrosine kinase in lymphoid cells, this protein may also function in, and be regulated by tyrosine kinase activity.
