= THYN1 =

Protein-coding gene in the species Homo sapiens

Available structures
PDB	Ortholog search: PDBe RCSB
PDB	List of PDB id codes 3EOP, 5J3E

Identifiers
- Aliases: THYN1, MDS012, MY105, THY28, THY28KD, HSPC144, thymocyte nuclear protein 1
- External IDs: OMIM: 613739; MGI: 1925112; HomoloGene: 8575; GeneCards: THYN1; OMA:THYN1 - orthologs

Gene location (Human)
Chr.	Chromosome 11 (human)
Band	11q25	Start	134,248,279 bp
Band	11q25	End	134,253,370 bp

Gene location (Mouse)
Chr.	Chromosome 9 (mouse)
Band	9|9 A4	Start	26,911,006 bp
Band	9|9 A4	End	26,918,632 bp
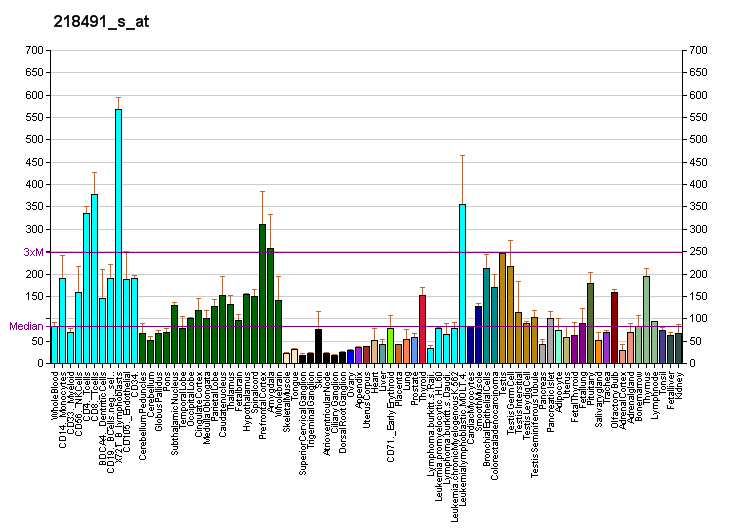
RNA expression pattern
Bgee	Human / Mouse (ortholog); Top expressed in: oocyte; right hemisphere of cerebellum; right frontal lobe; anterior pituitary; Brodmann area 9; left ovary; nucleus accumbens; anterior cingulate cortex; ganglionic eminence; right ovary / Top expressed in: genital tubercle; embryo; tail of embryo; ventricular zone; embryo; neural layer of retina; endocardial cushion; Epithelium of choroid plexus; spermatocyte; cerebellar cortex; More reference expression data
BioGPS	More reference expression data
Orthologs
Species	Human	Mouse
Entrez	29087	77862
Ensembl	ENSG00000151500	ENSMUSG00000035443
UniProt	Q9P016	Q91YJ3
RefSeq (mRNA)	NM_001037304; NM_001037305; NM_014174; NM_199297; NM_199298	NM_144543; NM_001326361
RefSeq (protein)	NP_001032381; NP_001032382; NP_054893; NP_954994; NP_954995	NP_001313290; NP_653126
Location (UCSC)	Chr 11: 134.25 – 134.25 Mb	Chr 9: 26.91 – 26.92 Mb
PubMed search
- Wikidata
View/Edit Human	View/Edit Mouse

Thymocyte nuclear protein 1 is a protein that in humans is encoded by the THYN1 gene.

This gene encodes a protein that is highly conserved among vertebrates and plant species and may be involved in the induction of apoptosis. Alternatively spliced transcript variants encoding different isoforms have been described.
