= MTRNR2L8 =

Protein-coding gene in the species Homo sapiens

Identifiers
- Aliases: MTRNR2L8, HN8, MT-RNR2-like 8, MT-RNR2 like 8, MT-RNR2 like 8 (pseudogene)
- External IDs: GeneCards: MTRNR2L8; OMA:MTRNR2L8 - orthologs

Gene location (Human)
Chr.	Chromosome 11 (human)
Band	11p15.4	Start	10,507,894 bp
Band	11p15.4	End	10,509,186 bp
RNA expression pattern
Bgee	Human / Mouse (ortholog); Top expressed in: sural nerve; stomach; heart; colon; brain; adrenal gland; left ventricle / n/a; More reference expression data
BioGPS	n/a
Gene ontology
Molecular function	receptor antagonist activity
Cellular component	cytoplasm; extracellular region
Biological process	extracellular negative regulation of signal transduction; negative regulation of execution phase of apoptosis; negative regulation of signaling receptor activity
Sources:Amigo / QuickGO
Orthologs
Species	Human	Mouse
Entrez	100463486	n/a
Ensembl	ENSG00000255823	n/a
UniProt	P0CJ75	n/a
RefSeq (mRNA)	NM_001190702	n/a
RefSeq (protein)	NP_001177631	n/a
Location (UCSC)	Chr 11: 10.51 – 10.51 Mb	n/a
PubMed search		n/a
- Wikidata
View/Edit Human

MT-RNR2-like 8 is a protein in humans that is encoded by the MTRNR2L8 gene.
