= Pecanex homolog 3 =

Protein-coding gene in the species Homo sapiens

PCNX3

Identifiers
- Aliases: PCNX3, PCNXL3, pecanex homolog 3 (Drosophila), pecanex homolog 3, pecanex 3
- External IDs: OMIM: 617657; MGI: 1861733; HomoloGene: 17000; GeneCards: PCNX3; OMA:PCNX3 - orthologs

Gene location (Human)
Chr.	Chromosome 11 (human)
Band	11q13.1	Start	65,615,776 bp
Band	11q13.1	End	65,637,439 bp

Gene location (Mouse)
Chr.	Chromosome 19 (mouse)
Band	19|19 A	Start	5,714,663 bp
Band	19|19 A	End	5,738,936 bp
RNA expression pattern
Bgee	Human / Mouse (ortholog); Top expressed in: granulocyte; stromal cell of endometrium; mucosa of transverse colon; spleen; blood; sural nerve; anterior pituitary; apex of heart; right hemisphere of cerebellum; body of stomach / Top expressed in: genital tubercle; tail of embryo; granulocyte; neural layer of retina; thymus; yolk sac; lip; primary visual cortex; ventricular zone; tibiofemoral joint; More reference expression data
BioGPS	n/a
Orthologs
Species	Human	Mouse
Entrez	399909	104401
Ensembl	ENSG00000197136	ENSMUSG00000054874
UniProt	Q9H6A9	Q8VI59
RefSeq (mRNA)	NM_032223	NM_144868
RefSeq (protein)	NP_115599	NP_659117
Location (UCSC)	Chr 11: 65.62 – 65.64 Mb	Chr 19: 5.71 – 5.74 Mb
PubMed search
- Wikidata
View/Edit Human	View/Edit Mouse

Pecanex homolog 3 is a protein that in humans is encoded by the PCNX3 gene.
