= TP53I11 =

Protein-coding gene in the species Homo sapiens

Identifiers
- Aliases: TP53I11, PIG11, tumor protein p53 inducible protein 11
- External IDs: OMIM: 617867; MGI: 2670995; HomoloGene: 4404; GeneCards: TP53I11; OMA:TP53I11 - orthologs

Gene location (Human)
Chr.	Chromosome 11 (human)
Band	11p11.2	Start	44,885,903 bp
Band	11p11.2	End	44,951,306 bp

Gene location (Mouse)
Chr.	Chromosome 2 (mouse)
Band	2|2 E1	Start	93,017,893 bp
Band	2|2 E1	End	93,032,104 bp
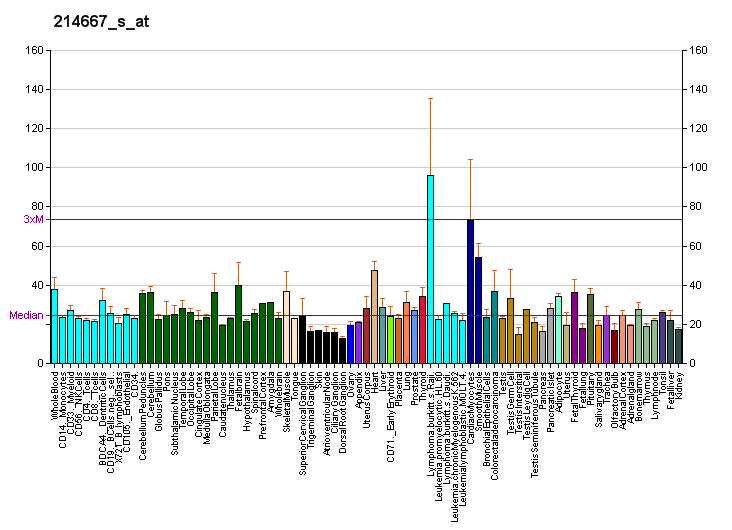
RNA expression pattern
Bgee	Human / Mouse (ortholog); Top expressed in: right hemisphere of cerebellum; right auricle of heart; right uterine tube; left uterine tube; ganglionic eminence; apex of heart; mucosa of transverse colon; popliteal artery; tibial arteries; upper lobe of left lung / Top expressed in: superior cervical ganglion; genital tubercle; tail of embryo; thymus; ventricular zone; habenula; transitional epithelium of urinary bladder; interventricular septum; suprachiasmatic nucleus; dentate gyrus of hippocampal formation granule cell; More reference expression data
BioGPS	More reference expression data
Orthologs
Species	Human	Mouse
Entrez	9537	277414
Ensembl	ENSG00000175274	ENSMUSG00000068735
UniProt	O14683	Q4QQM4
RefSeq (mRNA)	NM_001076787; NM_001258320; NM_001258321; NM_001258322; NM_001258323 NM_001258324; NM_006034; NM_001318384; NM_001318385; NM_001318386; NM_001318387; NM_001318388; NM_001318389; NM_001318390	NM_001025246; NM_001356535; NM_001356536; NM_001356537
RefSeq (protein)	NP_001245249; NP_001245250; NP_001245251; NP_001245252; NP_001245253 NP_001305313; NP_001305314; NP_001305315; NP_001305316; NP_001305317; NP_001305318; NP_001305319; NP_006025	NP_001020417; NP_001343464; NP_001343465; NP_001343466
Location (UCSC)	Chr 11: 44.89 – 44.95 Mb	Chr 2: 93.02 – 93.03 Mb
PubMed search
- Wikidata
View/Edit Human	View/Edit Mouse

Tumor protein p53-inducible protein 11 is a protein that in humans is encoded by the TP53I11 gene.
