= SIDT2 =

Protein-coding gene in the species Homo sapiens

Identifiers
- Aliases: SIDT2, CGI-40, SID1 transmembrane family member 2
- External IDs: OMIM: 617551; MGI: 2446134; GeneCards: SIDT2

Gene location (Human)
Chr.	Chromosome 11 (human)
Band	11q23.3	Start	117,178,736 bp
Band	11q23.3	End	117,197,445 bp

Gene location (Mouse)
Chr.	Chromosome 9 (mouse)
Band	9|9 A5.2	Start	45,849,155 bp
Band	9|9 A5.2	End	45,866,556 bp
RNA expression pattern
Bgee	Human / Mouse (ortholog); Top expressed in: endothelial cell; parotid gland; tibia; pancreatic ductal cell; tendon of biceps brachii; jejunal mucosa; visceral pleura; mucosa of ileum; body of pancreas; parietal pleura / Top expressed in: granulocyte; lip; adrenal gland; zone of skin; esophagus; ovary; thymus; white adipose tissue; urinary bladder; muscle of thigh; More reference expression data
BioGPS	n/a
Gene ontology
Molecular function	RNA transmembrane transporter activity; double-stranded RNA binding; AP-2 adaptor complex binding; AP-1 adaptor complex binding; nucleic acid transmembrane transporter activity; DNA binding; RNA binding
Cellular component	integral component of membrane; lysosomal membrane; membrane; lysosome; plasma membrane
Biological process	regulation of insulin secretion involved in cellular response to glucose stimulus; type B pancreatic cell development; response to glucose; type B pancreatic cell proliferation; glucose homeostasis; cell morphogenesis; dsRNA transport; RNA catabolic process; RNA transport
Sources:Amigo / QuickGO
Orthologs
Databases	NCBI: entry; OMA: entry
Species	Human	Mouse
Entrez	51092	214597
Ensembl	ENSG00000149577	ENSMUSG00000034908
UniProt	Q8NBJ9	Q8CIF6
RefSeq (mRNA)	NM_015996; NM_001040455	NM_001289668; NM_172257; NM_001359653
RefSeq (protein)	NP_001035545	NP_001276597; NP_758461; NP_001346582
Location (UCSC)	Chr 11: 117.18 – 117.2 Mb	Chr 9: 45.85 – 45.87 Mb
PubMed search
- Wikidata
View/Edit Human	View/Edit Mouse

SID1 transmembrane family member 2 is a protein that in humans is encoded by the SIDT2 gene.
