= TOP6BL =

Protein found in humans

Identifiers
- Aliases: TOP6BL, TOPOVIBL, chromosome 11 open reading frame 80, HYDM4, C11orf80
- External IDs: OMIM: 616109; MGI: 2685806; HomoloGene: 69381; GeneCards: TOP6BL; OMA:TOP6BL - orthologs

Gene location (Human)
| Chr. | Chromosome 11 (human) |
| Band | 11q13.2 | Start | 66,744,451 bp |
| Band | 11q13.2 | End | 66,843,516 bp |

Gene location (Mouse)
| Chr. | Chromosome 19 (mouse) |
| Band | 19|19 A | Start | 4,675,762 bp |
| Band | 19|19 A | End | 4,748,696 bp |
RNA expression pattern
| Bgee | Human / Mouse (ortholog); Top expressed in: skin of abdomen; skin of leg; cerebellar hemisphere; right hemisphere of cerebellum; right testis; left testis; ganglionic eminence; mucosa of transverse colon; minor salivary glands; right adrenal cortex / Top expressed in: white adipose tissue; embryo; embryo; spermatocyte; spermatid; cerebellar cortex; mesencephalon; neural tube; zygote; ventricular zone; More reference expression data |
| BioGPS | n/a |
Orthologs
| Species | Human | Mouse |
| Entrez | 79703 | 381196 |
| Ensembl | ENSG00000173715 | ENSMUSG00000071691 |
| UniProt | Q8N6T0 | A0A182DWE7 |
| RefSeq (mRNA) | NM_024650; NM_001302084 | NM_001033447 |
| RefSeq (protein) | NP_001289013; NP_078926 | NP_001028619 |
| Location (UCSC) | Chr 11: 66.74 – 66.84 Mb | Chr 19: 4.68 – 4.75 Mb |
| PubMed search |
- Wikidata
| View/Edit Human | View/Edit Mouse |

Type 2 DNA topoisomerase 6 subunit B-like is a protein that in humans is encoded by the gene TOP6BL (previously C11orf80). This protein is predicted to be involved in the process of meiosis.
