= Ras association domain family member 7 =

Protein-coding gene in the species Homo sapiens

RASSF7

Identifiers
- Aliases: RASSF7, C11orf13, HRAS1, HRC1, Ras association domain family member 7, CFAP88, FAP88
- External IDs: OMIM: 143023; MGI: 1914235; GeneCards: RASSF7

Gene location (Human)
Chr.	Chromosome 11 (human)
Band	11p15.5	Start	560,404 bp
Band	11p15.5	End	564,025 bp

Gene location (Mouse)
Chr.	Chromosome 7 (mouse)
Band	7|7 F5	Start	140,795,773 bp
Band	7|7 F5	End	140,798,571 bp
RNA expression pattern
Bgee	Human / Mouse (ortholog); Top expressed in: right uterine tube; mucosa of transverse colon; right lobe of liver; right lung; body of pancreas; right hemisphere of cerebellum; human kidney; olfactory zone of nasal mucosa; skin of leg; skin of abdomen / Top expressed in: esophagus; transitional epithelium of urinary bladder; lip; right kidney; intestinal villus; yolk sac; duodenum; jejunum; proximal tubule; left colon; More reference expression data
BioGPS	n/a
Gene ontology
Molecular function	protein binding
Cellular component	cytoplasm; cytoskeleton; microtubule organizing center
Biological process	signal transduction; apoptotic process; regulation of microtubule cytoskeleton organization
Sources:Amigo / QuickGO
Orthologs
Databases	NCBI: entry; OMA: entry
Species	Human	Mouse
Entrez	8045	66985
Ensembl	ENSG00000273859; ENSG00000099849	ENSMUSG00000038618
UniProt	Q02833	Q9DD19
RefSeq (mRNA)	NM_001143993; NM_001143994; NM_003475	NM_025886
RefSeq (protein)	NP_001137465; NP_001137466; NP_003466	NP_080162
Location (UCSC)	Chr 11: 0.56 – 0.56 Mb	Chr 7: 140.8 – 140.8 Mb
PubMed search
- Wikidata
View/Edit Human	View/Edit Mouse

Ras association domain family member 7 is a protein that in humans is encoded by the RASSF7 gene.
