= Piwi like rna-mediated gene silencing 4 =

Protein-coding gene in the species Homo sapiens

PIWIL4

Identifiers
- Aliases: PIWIL4, HIWI2, MIWI2, piwi like RNA-mediated gene silencing 4
- External IDs: OMIM: 610315; MGI: 3041167; HomoloGene: 45122; GeneCards: PIWIL4; OMA:PIWIL4 - orthologs

Gene location (Human)
Chr.	Chromosome 11 (human)
Band	11q21	Start	94,543,840 bp
Band	11q21	End	94,621,421 bp

Gene location (Mouse)
Chr.	Chromosome 9 (mouse)
Band	9|9 A2	Start	14,607,526 bp
Band	9|9 A2	End	14,652,036 bp
RNA expression pattern
Bgee	Human / Mouse (ortholog); Top expressed in: testicle; gonad; bone marrow; body of pancreas; bone marrow cell; trabecular bone; tibia; Achilles tendon; mucosa of transverse colon; ascending aorta / Top expressed in: pineal gland; blastocyst; Gonadal ridge; Paneth cell; left lung lobe; embryo; cumulus cell; embryo; tail of embryo; lumbar subsegment of spinal cord; More reference expression data
BioGPS	n/a
Gene ontology
Molecular function	piRNA binding; RNA binding; nucleic acid binding; endoribonuclease activity
Cellular component	cytoplasm; piP-body; nucleus; P granule
Biological process	multicellular organism development; cell differentiation; meiosis; regulation of translation; DNA methylation involved in gamete generation; spermatogenesis; gene silencing; piRNA metabolic process; negative regulation of transposition; RNA phosphodiester bond hydrolysis, endonucleolytic; epithelial structure maintenance
Sources:Amigo / QuickGO
Orthologs
Species	Human	Mouse
Entrez	143689	330890
Ensembl	ENSG00000134627	ENSMUSG00000036912
UniProt	Q7Z3Z4	Q8CGT6
RefSeq (mRNA)	NM_152431	NM_177905; NM_001368831; NM_001368832; NM_001368836
RefSeq (protein)	NP_689644	NP_001355760; NP_001355761; NP_001355765
Location (UCSC)	Chr 11: 94.54 – 94.62 Mb	Chr 9: 14.61 – 14.65 Mb
PubMed search
- Wikidata
View/Edit Human	View/Edit Mouse

Piwi like RNA-mediated gene silencing 4 is a protein that in humans is encoded by the PIWIL4 gene.

== Function ==
PIWIL4 belongs to the Argonaute family of proteins, which function in development and maintenance of germline stem cells (Sasaki et al., 2003 [PubMed 12906857]).
