= GPHA2 =

Protein-coding gene in the species Homo sapiens

Identifiers
- Aliases: GPHA2, A2, GPA2, ZSIG51, glycoprotein hormone alpha 2, glycoprotein hormone subunit alpha 2
- External IDs: OMIM: 609651; MGI: 2156541; GeneCards: GPHA2

Gene location (Human)
Chr.	Chromosome 11 (human)
Band	11q13.1	Start	64,934,471 bp
Band	11q13.1	End	64,935,893 bp

Gene location (Mouse)
Chr.	Chromosome 19 (mouse)
Band	19|19 A	Start	6,276,410 bp
Band	19|19 A	End	6,277,798 bp
RNA expression pattern
Bgee	Human / Mouse (ortholog); Top expressed in: oocyte; body of pancreas; gonad; gallbladder; secondary oocyte; testicle; right testis; pituitary gland; left testis; anterior pituitary / Top expressed in: adrenal gland; morula; blastocyst; embryo; zone of skin; embryo; lip; urinary bladder; ovary; testicle; More reference expression data
BioGPS	n/a
Gene ontology
Molecular function	hormone activity; thyrotropin-releasing hormone receptor binding; protein heterodimerization activity; protein binding; hormone receptor binding
Cellular component	extracellular region; intracellular anatomical structure; extracellular space
Biological process	cell surface receptor signaling pathway; regulation of signaling receptor activity; G protein-coupled receptor signaling pathway; adenylate cyclase-activating G protein-coupled receptor signaling pathway
Sources:Amigo / QuickGO
Orthologs
Databases	NCBI: entry; OMA: entry
Species	Human	Mouse
Entrez	170589	170458
Ensembl	ENSG00000149735	ENSMUSG00000024784
UniProt	Q96T91	Q925Q5
RefSeq (mRNA)	NM_130769	NM_130453
RefSeq (protein)	NP_570125	NP_569720
Location (UCSC)	Chr 11: 64.93 – 64.94 Mb	Chr 19: 6.28 – 6.28 Mb
PubMed search
- Wikidata
View/Edit Human	View/Edit Mouse

Glycoprotein hormone alpha-2 is a protein that in humans is encoded by the GPHA2 gene.

GPHA2 is a cystine knot-forming polypeptide and a subunit of the dimeric glycoprotein hormone family (Hsu et al., 2002). (Supplied by OMIM.)
