= CDHR5 =

Protein-coding gene in humans

Identifiers
- Aliases: CDHR5, MU-PCDH, MUCDHL, MUPCDH, MLPCDH, cadherin related family member 5
- External IDs: OMIM: 606839; MGI: 1919290; GeneCards: CDHR5

Gene location (Human)
Chr.	Chromosome 11 (human)
Band	11p15.5	Start	616,577 bp
Band	11p15.5	End	626,078 bp

Gene location (Mouse)
Chr.	Chromosome 7 (mouse)
Band	7|7 F5	Start	140,848,996 bp
Band	7|7 F5	End	140,856,699 bp
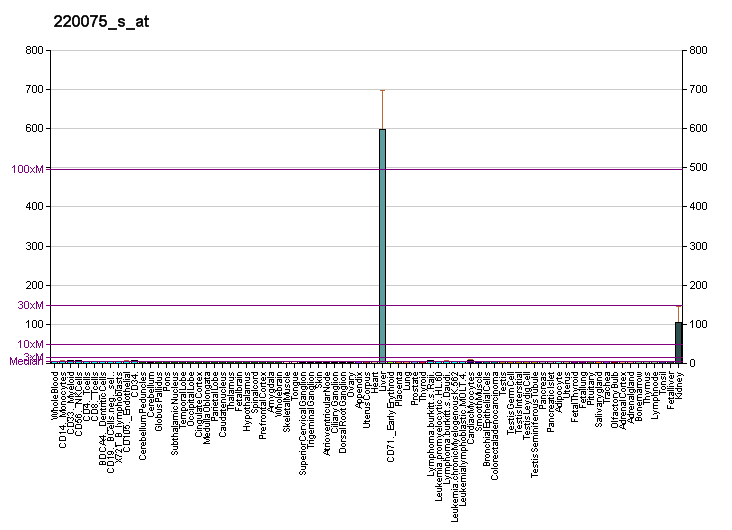

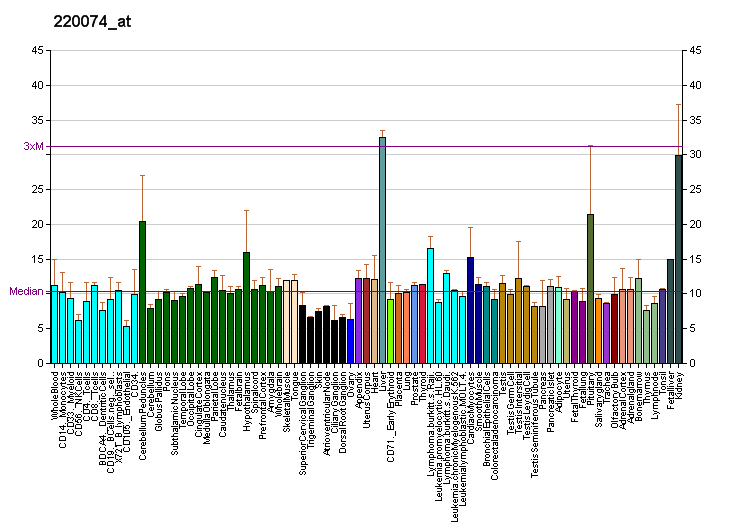

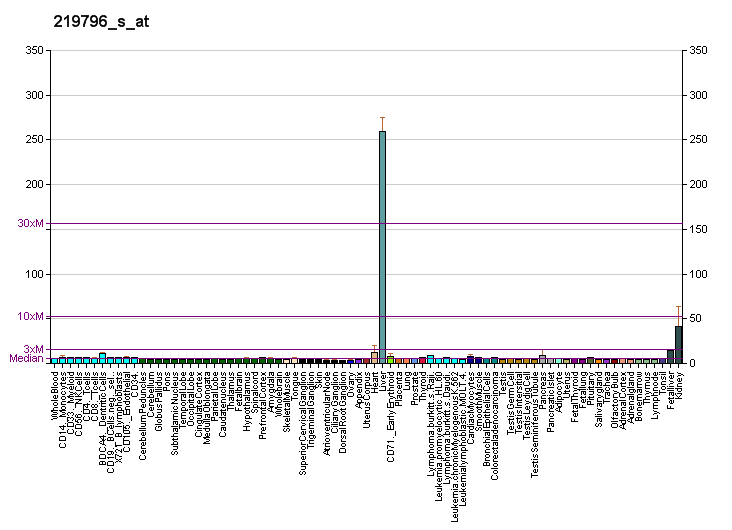
RNA expression pattern
Bgee	Human / Mouse (ortholog); Top expressed in: duodenum; mucosa of transverse colon; rectum; right lobe of liver; human kidney; testicle; epithelium of colon; gallbladder; sural nerve; appendix / Top expressed in: duodenum; large intestine; colon; right kidney; jejunum; crypt of lieberkuhn of small intestine; ileum; left colon; human kidney; proximal tubule; More reference expression data
BioGPS	More reference expression data
Gene ontology
Molecular function	calcium ion binding; beta-catenin binding; protein binding; cell adhesion molecule binding
Cellular component	integral component of membrane; spanning component of plasma membrane; brush border membrane; clathrin-coated pit; plasma membrane; extracellular exosome; membrane; cell projection; microvillus membrane; apical plasma membrane
Biological process	cell adhesion; regulation of microvillus length; homophilic cell adhesion via plasma membrane adhesion molecules; intermicrovillar adhesion; cell differentiation
Sources:Amigo / QuickGO
Orthologs
Databases	NCBI: entry; OMA: entry
Species	Human	Mouse
Entrez	53841	72040
Ensembl	ENSG00000099834; ENSG00000273572	ENSMUSG00000025497
UniProt	Q9HBB8	Q8VHF2
RefSeq (mRNA)	NM_001171968; NM_017717; NM_021924; NM_031264; NM_031265	NM_001114322; NM_028069
RefSeq (protein)	NP_001165439; NP_068743; NP_112554	NP_001107794; NP_082345
Location (UCSC)	Chr 11: 0.62 – 0.63 Mb	Chr 7: 140.85 – 140.86 Mb
PubMed search
- Wikidata
View/Edit Human	View/Edit Mouse

Cadherin-related family member 5 is a protein that in humans is encoded by the CDHR5 gene (previously MUPCDH).

This gene is a novel mucin-like gene that is a member of the cadherin superfamily. While encoding nonpolymorphic tandem repeats rich in proline, serine and threonine similar to mucin proteins, the gene also contains sequence encoding calcium-binding motifs found in all cadherins. The role of the hybrid extracellular region and the specific function of this protein have not yet been determined. Alternative splicing has been identified, with observed variation resulting in the presence or absence of domains. In addition, splicing occurs in the 5' UTR but transcripts including these variations have not been described completely.
