= Ras association domain family member 10 =

Protein-coding gene in the species Homo sapiens

RASSF10

Identifiers
- Aliases: RASSF10, Ras association domain family member 10
- External IDs: OMIM: 614713; MGI: 1925998; GeneCards: RASSF10

Gene location (Human)
Chr.	Chromosome 11 (human)
Band	11p15.3	Start	13,009,316 bp
Band	11p15.3	End	13,012,119 bp

Gene location (Mouse)
Chr.	Chromosome 7 (mouse)
Band	7|7 F1	Start	112,553,169 bp
Band	7|7 F1	End	112,556,664 bp
RNA expression pattern
Bgee	Human / Mouse (ortholog); Top expressed in: bronchial epithelial cell; testicle; oral cavity; gums; lactiferous duct; olfactory zone of nasal mucosa; buccal mucosa cell; nipple; pancreatic ductal cell; gingival epithelium / Top expressed in: otolith organ; utricle; lumbar spinal ganglion; hair follicle; trigeminal ganglion; vestibular membrane of cochlear duct; Paneth cell; aortic valve; renal corpuscle; ciliary body; More reference expression data
BioGPS	n/a
Orthologs
Databases	NCBI: entry; OMA: entry
Species	Human	Mouse
Entrez	644943	78748
Ensembl	ENSG00000189431	ENSMUSG00000098132
UniProt	A6NK89	Q8BL43
RefSeq (mRNA)	NM_001080521	NM_175279
RefSeq (protein)	NP_001073990	NP_780488
Location (UCSC)	Chr 11: 13.01 – 13.01 Mb	Chr 7: 112.55 – 112.56 Mb
PubMed search
- Wikidata
View/Edit Human	View/Edit Mouse

Ras association domain family member 10 is a protein that in humans is encoded by the RASSF10 gene.
