= TM7SF2 =

Protein-coding gene in the species Homo sapiens

Identifiers
- Aliases: TM7SF2, ANG1, DHCR14A, NET47, transmembrane 7 superfamily member 2, C14SR
- External IDs: OMIM: 603414; MGI: 1920416; GeneCards: TM7SF2
Enzyme activity
EC #	BRENDA	ExPASy	KEGG	MetaCyc
1.3.1.70	↗	↗	↗	↗

Gene location (Human)
Chr.	Chromosome 11 (human)
Band	11q13.1	Start	65,111,845 bp
Band	11q13.1	End	65,116,384 bp

Gene location (Mouse)
Chr.	Chromosome 19 (mouse)
Band	19|19 A	Start	6,112,851 bp
Band	19|19 A	End	6,118,403 bp
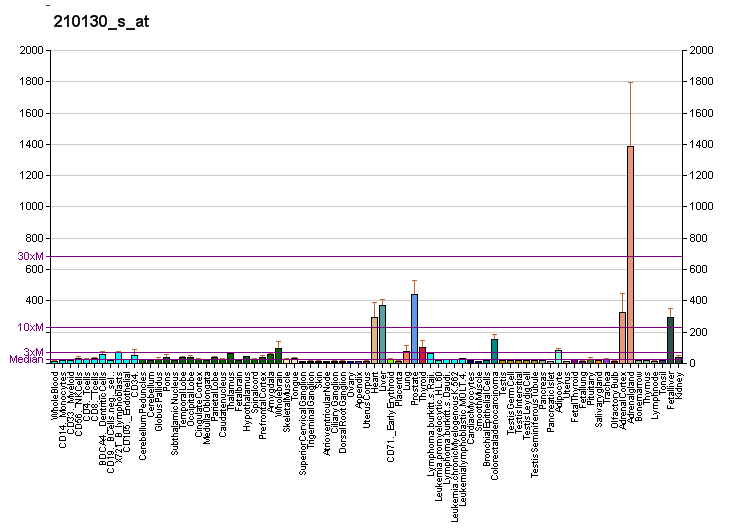
RNA expression pattern
Bgee	Human / Mouse (ortholog); Top expressed in: right adrenal cortex; left adrenal cortex; body of pancreas; right lobe of liver; apex of heart; skin of abdomen; skin of leg; vulva; prefrontal cortex; left ovary / Top expressed in: left lobe of liver; otic vesicle; ciliary body; spinal ganglia; otic placode; iris; esophagus; medial dorsal nucleus; neural layer of retina; pyloric antrum; More reference expression data
BioGPS	More reference expression data
Gene ontology
Molecular function	oxidoreductase activity, acting on the CH-CH group of donors; oxidoreductase activity, acting on the CH-CH group of donors, NAD or NADP as acceptor; oxidoreductase activity; delta14-sterol reductase activity; NADP binding
Cellular component	organelle membrane; integral component of membrane; endoplasmic reticulum membrane; membrane; receptor complex; integral component of plasma membrane; integral component of endoplasmic reticulum membrane; nuclear inner membrane; endoplasmic reticulum; intracellular membrane-bounded organelle
Biological process	steroid metabolic process; sterol biosynthetic process; lipid metabolism; cholesterol metabolic process; cholesterol biosynthetic process; steroid biosynthetic process; regulation of cholesterol biosynthetic process
Sources:Amigo / QuickGO
Orthologs
Databases	NCBI: entry; OMA: entry
Species	Human	Mouse
Entrez	7108	73166
Ensembl	ENSG00000149809	ENSMUSG00000024799
UniProt	O76062	Q71KT5
RefSeq (mRNA)	NM_001277233; NM_003273	NM_028454
RefSeq (protein)	NP_001264162; NP_003264	NP_082730
Location (UCSC)	Chr 11: 65.11 – 65.12 Mb	Chr 19: 6.11 – 6.12 Mb
PubMed search
- Wikidata
View/Edit Human	View/Edit Mouse

Delta(14)-sterol reductase is an enzyme that in humans is encoded by the TM7SF2 gene.
