= Placenta expressed transcript 1 =

Protein-coding gene in the species Homo sapiens

PLET1

Identifiers
- Aliases: PLET1, C11orf34, placenta expressed transcript 1
- External IDs: OMIM: 611904; MGI: 1923759; HomoloGene: 49928; GeneCards: PLET1; OMA:PLET1 - orthologs

Gene location (Human)
Chr.	Chromosome 11 (human)
Band	11q23.1	Start	112,248,153 bp
Band	11q23.1	End	112,260,860 bp

Gene location (Mouse)
Chr.	Chromosome 9 (mouse)
Band	9|9 A5.3	Start	50,405,825 bp
Band	9|9 A5.3	End	50,416,782 bp
RNA expression pattern
Bgee	Human / Mouse (ortholog); Top expressed in: testicle; epithelium of colon; sural nerve; Achilles tendon; islet of Langerhans; gastric mucosa; right lung; left adrenal cortex; anterior pituitary; right adrenal gland / Top expressed in: submandibular gland; parotid gland; corneal stroma; transitional epithelium of urinary bladder; lacrimal gland; lactiferous gland; epithelium of stomach; conjunctival fornix; uterus; prostate; More reference expression data
BioGPS	n/a
Orthologs
Species	Human	Mouse
Entrez	349633	76509
Ensembl	ENSG00000188771	ENSMUSG00000032068
UniProt	Q6UQ28	Q8VEN2
RefSeq (mRNA)	NM_001145024	NM_029639
RefSeq (protein)	NP_001138496	NP_083915
Location (UCSC)	Chr 11: 112.25 – 112.26 Mb	Chr 9: 50.41 – 50.42 Mb
PubMed search
- Wikidata
View/Edit Human	View/Edit Mouse

Placenta expressed transcript 1 is a protein that in humans is encoded by the PLET1 gene.
