= Transmembrane protein 134 =

Protein-coding gene in the species Homo sapiens

TMEM134

Identifiers
- Aliases: TMEM134, 2410001H17Rik, AI463452, transmembrane protein 134
- External IDs: MGI: 1914240; HomoloGene: 11837; GeneCards: TMEM134; OMA:TMEM134 - orthologs

Gene location (Human)
Chr.	Chromosome 11 (human)
Band	11q13.2	Start	67,461,710 bp
Band	11q13.2	End	67,469,272 bp

Gene location (Mouse)
Chr.	Chromosome 19 (mouse)
Band	19|19 A	Start	4,175,934 bp
Band	19|19 A	End	4,182,306 bp
RNA expression pattern
Bgee	Human / Mouse (ortholog); Top expressed in: skin of abdomen; skin of leg; body of pancreas; nipple; muscle of thigh; apex of heart; mucosa of pharynx; right uterine tube; olfactory zone of nasal mucosa; body of stomach / Top expressed in: lip; granulocyte; muscle of thigh; right kidney; yolk sac; ventricular zone; esophagus; proximal tubule; embryo; superior frontal gyrus; More reference expression data
BioGPS	n/a
Orthologs
Species	Human	Mouse
Entrez	80194	66990
Ensembl	ENSG00000172663	ENSMUSG00000024845
UniProt	Q9H6X4	Q8R0J4
RefSeq (mRNA)	NM_001078650; NM_001078651; NM_025124	NM_001078649; NM_025889
RefSeq (protein)	NP_001072118; NP_001072119; NP_079400	NP_001072117; NP_080165
Location (UCSC)	Chr 11: 67.46 – 67.47 Mb	Chr 19: 4.18 – 4.18 Mb
PubMed search
- Wikidata
View/Edit Human	View/Edit Mouse

Transmembrane protein 134 is a protein encoded by the TMEM134 gene. TMEM134 does not have any other known aliases. There are two transmembrane domains and a domain of unknown function (DUF872). Evolutionary, the majority of the organisms that have this gene are primates and mammals, although there are some organisms dating back to Drosophila and C. elegans. Through current research, there has not been any confirmed function of TMEM134.

== Gene Structure ==
The gene is composed of 6 exons spanning from 67464348 to 67469277 kilo bases. It is located on chromosome 11q13.2, which is the minus strand of the chromosome. The gene does have three isoforms; a, b, and c.

== Protein ==
=== Protein Structure ===
The protein is encoded by TMEM134 gene and is 195 amino acids in length. The protein contains two transmembrane domains but does not contain a signal peptide. This suggests that there is an internal signal peptide upstream of the translated portion of the protein. The protein is overall considering normal with its amino acid content but does have two regions of high hydrophobicity, which occur during the transmembrane regions of the protein. This gives the protein an isoelectric point of 6.08. The overall weight of the protein is 21.6 kilodaltons, which is conserved throughout the different orthologs. The protein also contains a domain of unknown function 872 (DUF872). Currently there is no thought to the possible function of this domain.

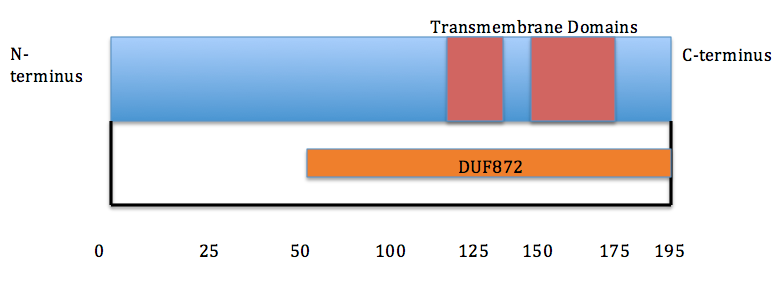
This is a protein construct of TMEM134 containing the two transmembrane domains and DUF872.

=== Regulation and Translation ===
TMEM134 is regulated by the promoter GXP50275. There are 870 amino acids in the promoter and 15 transcripts variants of it. The promoter is well conserved in mammals. There are some conserved binding regions in the promoter including EGR/nerve factor and Huntington's disease gene regulatory region.

=== Location ===
The final protein is thought to be in the endoplasmic reticulum and the nuclear membrane. The protein is anchored in two different regions, from 123-145 and 155-177. The portion of the protein that extends into the cytosol is heavily phosphorylated. These phosphorylation sites are conserved into bony fishes.

=== Post-Translational Modification ===
The only post-translational modification that occurs is phosphorylation. There is no glycosylation, sulfination, or sumoylation sites.

=== Interactions ===
TMEM134 has one interaction with another protein, ELAVL1. This protein binds to AU rich elements in FOS and IL3/interleukin-3 mRNAs.

== Expression ==
Microarray analysis of GEO profiles were conducted and TMEM134 is shown to be ubiquitously expressed in the majority of human tissues. Even though there is ubiquitous expression in the human tissues, there are other tissues that have higher expression levels, such as the heart, breast tissue, and prostate tissue.

== Homology ==
As discussed earlier, there is quite a bit of conservation in primates and mammals but there are some distant orthologs of zebrafish and Drosophila, and a homolog of C. elegans.

Genus and species	Common name	Length	Accession	Percent identity
Homo sapiens	Human	195 aa	NP_079400	100%
Papio anubis	Olive baboon	195 aa	XP_003905916.1	97%
Sus scrofa	Wild boar	246 aa	XP_003480710	95%
Orincus ocra	Orca	195 aa	XP_004278064	94%
Equua callabus	Horse	208 aa	XP_005598525	92%
Ceratotherium simum simum	White rhinocerus	186 aa	XP_004437766	89%
Bos taurus	Cow	229 aa	XP_005227097	78%
Drosophilia melanogstar	Fruit fly	170 aa	NP_001261296	32%
Caenorhabditis elegans	Worm	168 aa	NP_001021401	26%
