= KIAA1549L =

Protein-coding gene in the species Homo sapiens

Identifiers
- Aliases: KIAA1549L, C11orf41, C11orf69, G2, KIAA1549-like, KIAA1549 like
- External IDs: OMIM: 612297; MGI: 2181743; GeneCards: KIAA1549L

Gene location (Human)
Chr.	Chromosome 11 (human)
Band	11p13	Start	33,376,108 bp
Band	11p13	End	33,674,102 bp

Gene location (Mouse)
Chr.	Chromosome 2 (mouse)
Band	2 E2|2 54.59 cM	Start	103,973,418 bp
Band	2 E2|2 54.59 cM	End	104,241,358 bp
RNA expression pattern
Bgee	Human / Mouse (ortholog); Top expressed in: middle temporal gyrus; Brodmann area 23; postcentral gyrus; superior frontal gyrus; endothelial cell; entorhinal cortex; primary visual cortex; prefrontal cortex; dorsolateral prefrontal cortex; right frontal lobe / Top expressed in: sciatic nerve; otolith organ; utricle; facial motor nucleus; visual cortex; primary visual cortex; dentate gyrus of hippocampal formation granule cell; primary motor cortex; Rostral migratory stream; superior frontal gyrus; More reference expression data
BioGPS	n/a
Orthologs
Databases	NCBI: entry; OMA: entry
Species	Human	Mouse
Entrez	25758	241589
Ensembl	ENSG00000110427	ENSMUSG00000068373
UniProt	Q6ZVL6	n/a
RefSeq (mRNA)	NM_012194	NM_001033347; NM_001368844
RefSeq (protein)	NP_036326	n/a
Location (UCSC)	Chr 11: 33.38 – 33.67 Mb	Chr 2: 103.97 – 104.24 Mb
PubMed search
- Wikidata
View/Edit Human	View/Edit Mouse

KIAA1549-like is a protein that in humans is encoded by the KIAA1549L gene. KIAA1549L is thought be primarily located in the cell membrane. As its name suggests, it is a paralog of KIAA1549, a protein that is best known for fusing with BRAF in certain brain cancers.
