= P53AIP1 =

Protein-coding gene in the species Homo sapiens

TP53AIP1

Identifiers
- Aliases: TP53AIP1, P53AIP1, tumor protein p53 regulated apoptosis inducing protein 1
- External IDs: OMIM: 605426; HomoloGene: 137360; GeneCards: TP53AIP1; OMA:TP53AIP1 - orthologs

Gene location (Human)
Chr.	Chromosome 11 (human)
Band	11q24.3	Start	128,934,731 bp
Band	11q24.3	End	128,943,399 bp
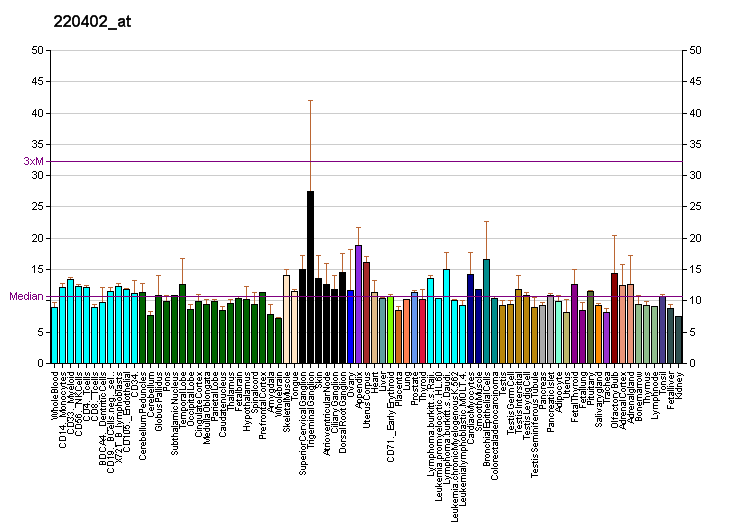

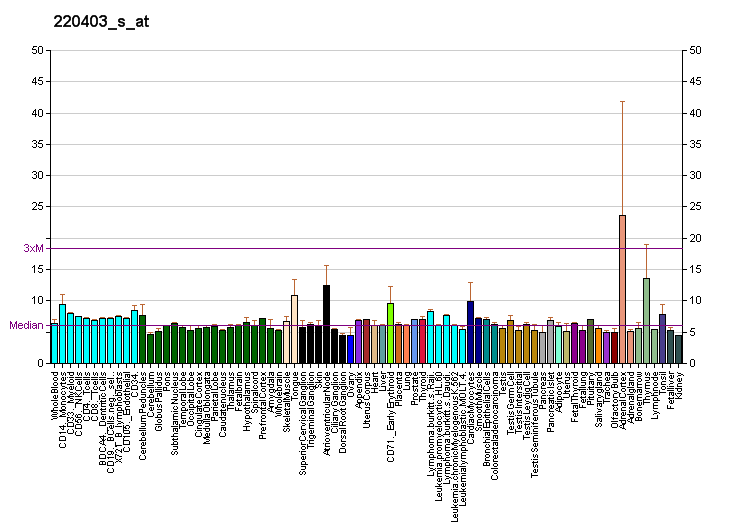
RNA expression pattern
Bgee	Human / Mouse (ortholog); Top expressed in: buccal mucosa cell; hair follicle; gingival epithelium; skin of abdomen; skin of limb; skin of leg; skin of arm; testicle; vagina; vulva / n/a; More reference expression data
BioGPS	More reference expression data
Gene ontology
Molecular function	molecular function
Cellular component	mitochondrion; mitochondrial matrix
Biological process	apoptotic process; regulation of apoptotic process
Sources:Amigo / QuickGO
Orthologs
Species	Human	Mouse
Entrez	63970	n/a
Ensembl	ENSG00000120471	n/a
UniProt	Q9HCN2	n/a
RefSeq (mRNA)	NM_022112; NM_001195194; NM_001195195; NM_001251964	n/a
RefSeq (protein)	NP_001182123; NP_001182124; NP_001238893; NP_071395	n/a
Location (UCSC)	Chr 11: 128.93 – 128.94 Mb	n/a
PubMed search		n/a
- Wikidata
View/Edit Human

p53-regulated apoptosis-inducing protein 1 is a protein that in humans is encoded by the TP53AIP1 gene.
