= FAM118B =

Protein-coding gene in the species Homo sapiens

Identifiers
- Aliases: FAM118B, family with sequence similarity 118 member B
- External IDs: OMIM: 616587; MGI: 1924483; HomoloGene: 11584; GeneCards: FAM118B; OMA:FAM118B - orthologs

Gene location (Human)
Chr.	Chromosome 11 (human)
Band	11q24.2	Start	126,211,724 bp
Band	11q24.2	End	126,262,984 bp

Gene location (Mouse)
Chr.	Chromosome 9 (mouse)
Band	9|9 A4	Start	35,128,261 bp
Band	9|9 A4	End	35,179,101 bp
RNA expression pattern
Bgee	Human / Mouse (ortholog); Top expressed in: oocyte; secondary oocyte; mucosa of sigmoid colon; rectum; mucosa of transverse colon; tendon of biceps brachii; mucosa of ileum; right ventricle; nucleus accumbens; monocyte / Top expressed in: spermatocyte; spermatid; seminiferous tubule; secondary oocyte; ganglionic eminence; yolk sac; endocardial cushion; muscle of thigh; ileum; epithelium of small intestine; More reference expression data
BioGPS	n/a
Gene ontology
Molecular function	protein binding
Cellular component	Cajal body; nucleus
Biological process	Cajal body organization
Sources:Amigo / QuickGO
Orthologs
Species	Human	Mouse
Entrez	79607	109229
Ensembl	ENSG00000197798	ENSMUSG00000050471
UniProt	Q9BPY3	Q8C569
RefSeq (mRNA)	NM_024556; NM_001330446	NM_001286604; NM_175411; NM_194257
RefSeq (protein)	NP_001317375; NP_078832	NP_001273533; NP_780620; NP_919233
Location (UCSC)	Chr 11: 126.21 – 126.26 Mb	Chr 9: 35.13 – 35.18 Mb
PubMed search
- Wikidata
View/Edit Human	View/Edit Mouse

Family with sequence similarity 118, member B is a protein that in humans is encoded by the FAM118B gene.
