= TMPRSS4 =

Protein-coding gene in the species Homo sapiens

Identifiers
- Aliases: TMPRSS4, CAPH2, MT-SP2, TMPRSS3, transmembrane protease, serine 4, transmembrane serine protease 4, CAP2
- External IDs: OMIM: 606565; MGI: 2384877; GeneCards: TMPRSS4

Gene location (Human)
| Chr. | Chromosome 11 (human) |
| Band | 11q23.3 | Start | 118,077,012 bp |
| Band | 11q23.3 | End | 118,121,890 bp |

Gene location (Mouse)
| Chr. | Chromosome 9 (mouse) |
| Band | 9|9 A5.2 | Start | 45,084,024 bp |
| Band | 9|9 A5.2 | End | 45,115,390 bp |
RNA expression pattern
| Bgee | Human / Mouse (ortholog); Top expressed in: mucosa of transverse colon; nasal epithelium; palpebral conjunctiva; rectum; olfactory zone of nasal mucosa; epithelium of nasopharynx; gallbladder; mucosa of sigmoid colon; mucosa of ileum; epithelium of colon / Top expressed in: duodenum; Paneth cell; lip; ileum; crypt of lieberkuhn of small intestine; conjunctival fornix; left colon; jejunum; intestinal villus; cervix; More reference expression data |
| BioGPS | n/a |
Gene ontology
| Molecular function | scavenger receptor activity; peptidase activity; serine-type peptidase activity; protein binding; hydrolase activity; serine-type endopeptidase activity |
| Cellular component | integral component of membrane; membrane; secretory granule |
| Biological process | receptor-mediated endocytosis; proteolysis; response to wounding; regulation of gene expression; negative regulation of growth rate; vesicle-mediated transport; endocytosis |
Sources:Amigo / QuickGO
Orthologs
| Databases | NCBI: entry; OMA: entry |
| Species | Human | Mouse |
| Entrez | 56649 | 214523 |
| Ensembl | ENSG00000137648 | ENSMUSG00000032091 |
| UniProt | Q9NRS4 | Q8VCA5 |
| RefSeq (mRNA) | NM_001083947; NM_001173551; NM_001173552; NM_001290094; NM_001290096 NM_019894; NM_183247 | NM_145403; NM_001364528 |
| RefSeq (protein) | NP_001077416; NP_001167022; NP_001167023; NP_001277023; NP_001277025 NP_063947 | NP_663378; NP_001351457 |
| Location (UCSC) | Chr 11: 118.08 – 118.12 Mb | Chr 9: 45.08 – 45.12 Mb |
| PubMed search |
- Wikidata
| View/Edit Human | View/Edit Mouse |

Transmembrane protease, serine 4 is a protein in humans that is encoded by the TMPRSS4 gene.

This gene encodes a member of the serine protease family. Serine proteases are known to be involved in a variety of biological processes, whose malfunction often leads to human diseases and disorders. This gene was identified as a gene overexpressed in pancreatic carcinoma. The encoded protein is membrane bound with a N-terminal anchor sequence and a glycosylated extracellular region containing the serine protease domain. Multiple transcript variants encoding different isoforms have been found for this gene.
