= Adp-ribosyltransferase 5 =

Protein found in humans

ART5

Identifiers
- Aliases: ART5, ARTC5, ADP-ribosyltransferase 5
- External IDs: OMIM: 610625; MGI: 107948; GeneCards: ART5
Enzyme activity
EC #	BRENDA	ExPASy	KEGG	MetaCyc
2.4.2.31	↗	↗	↗	↗

Gene location (Human)
Chr.	Chromosome 11 (human)
Band	11p15.4	Start	3,638,512 bp
Band	11p15.4	End	3,642,316 bp

Gene location (Mouse)
Chr.	Chromosome 7 (mouse)
Band	7 E2|7 54.71 cM	Start	101,746,086 bp
Band	7 E2|7 54.71 cM	End	101,758,696 bp
RNA expression pattern
Bgee	Human / Mouse (ortholog); Top expressed in: left testis; testicle; right testis; gonad; muscle of thigh; gastrocnemius muscle; left ovary; right ovary; apex of heart; ectocervix / Top expressed in: spermatid; spermatocyte; muscle of thigh; masseter muscle; soleus muscle; seminiferous tubule; plantaris muscle; temporal muscle; extensor digitorum longus muscle; extraocular muscle; More reference expression data
BioGPS	n/a
Gene ontology
Molecular function	NAD+ ADP-ribosyltransferase activity; NAD+ nucleosidase activity; NAD+-protein-arginine ADP-ribosyltransferase activity; transferase activity; glycosyltransferase activity
Cellular component	extracellular region; membrane
Biological process	protein ADP-ribosylation; peptidyl-arginine ADP-ribosylation
Sources:Amigo / QuickGO
Orthologs
Databases	NCBI: entry; OMA: entry
Species	Human	Mouse
Entrez	116969	11875
Ensembl	ENSG00000167311	ENSMUSG00000070424
UniProt	Q96L15	P70352
RefSeq (mRNA)	NM_001079536; NM_001297668; NM_053017	NM_001291354; NM_007491
RefSeq (protein)	NP_001073004; NP_001284597; NP_443750	NP_001278283; NP_031517
Location (UCSC)	Chr 11: 3.64 – 3.64 Mb	Chr 7: 101.75 – 101.76 Mb
PubMed search
- Wikidata
View/Edit Human	View/Edit Mouse

ADP-ribosyltransferase 5 is a protein that in humans is encoded by the ART5 gene.

== Function ==
The protein encoded by this gene belongs to the ARG -specific ADP - ribosyltransferase family. Proteins in this family regulate the function of target proteins by attaching ADP -ribose to specific amino acid residues in their target proteins. The mouse homolog lacks a glycosylphosphatidylinositol-anchor signal sequence and is predicted to be a secretory enzyme. Several transcripts encoding different isoforms have been found for this gene. [provided by RefSeq, Jul 2014].
