= Coiled-coil domain containing 88B =

Protein found in humans

CCDC88B

Identifiers
- Aliases: CCDC88B, BRLZ, CCDC88, HKRP3, gipie, coiled-coil domain containing 88B
- External IDs: OMIM: 611205; MGI: 1925567; HomoloGene: 49992; GeneCards: CCDC88B; OMA:CCDC88B - orthologs

Gene location (Human)
Chr.	Chromosome 11 (human)
Band	11q13.1	Start	64,340,204 bp
Band	11q13.1	End	64,357,534 bp

Gene location (Mouse)
Chr.	Chromosome 19 (mouse)
Band	19|19 A	Start	6,821,991 bp
Band	19|19 A	End	6,835,579 bp
RNA expression pattern
Bgee	Human / Mouse (ortholog); Top expressed in: granulocyte; cerebellar hemisphere; right hemisphere of cerebellum; spleen; appendix; monocyte; bone marrow cell; blood; mucosa of transverse colon; lymph node / Top expressed in: granulocyte; thymus; mesenteric lymph nodes; neural layer of retina; spermatocyte; spermatid; bone marrow; spleen; blood; seminiferous tubule; More reference expression data
BioGPS	n/a
Gene ontology
Molecular function	microtubule binding; dynein light intermediate chain binding
Cellular component	membrane; cytoplasm; endoplasmic reticulum; Golgi apparatus; centrosome; cytoskeleton
Biological process	positive regulation of T cell activation; positive regulation of T cell proliferation; positive regulation of cytokine production; defense response to protozoan; cytoskeleton-dependent intracellular transport; cytoplasmic microtubule organization
Sources:Amigo / QuickGO
Orthologs
Species	Human	Mouse
Entrez	283234	78317
Ensembl	ENSG00000168071	ENSMUSG00000047810
UniProt	A6NC98	Q4QRL3
RefSeq (mRNA)	NM_032251	NM_001081291; NM_198008
RefSeq (protein)	NP_115627	NP_001074760
Location (UCSC)	Chr 11: 64.34 – 64.36 Mb	Chr 19: 6.82 – 6.84 Mb
PubMed search
- Wikidata
View/Edit Human	View/Edit Mouse

Coiled-coil domain containing 88B is a protein that in humans is encoded by the CCDC88B gene.

== Function ==
This gene encodes a member of the hook-related protein family. Members of this family are characterized by an N-terminal potential microtubule binding domain, a central coiled-coiled and a C-terminal Hook-related domain. The encoded protein may be involved in linking organelles to microtubules. [provided by RefSeq, Oct 2009].
