= GLB1L3 =

Protein

Identifiers
- Aliases: GLB1L3, galactosidase beta 1 like 3
- External IDs: MGI: 1918143; GeneCards: GLB1L3
Enzyme activity
EC #	BRENDA	ExPASy	KEGG	MetaCyc
3.2.1.23	↗	↗	↗	↗

Gene location (Human)
Chr.	Chromosome 11 (human)
Band	11q25	Start	134,274,245 bp
Band	11q25	End	134,319,564 bp

Gene location (Mouse)
Chr.	Chromosome 9 (mouse)
Band	9|9 A4	Start	26,729,249 bp
Band	9|9 A4	End	26,772,186 bp
RNA expression pattern
Bgee	Human / Mouse (ortholog); Top expressed in: testicle; secondary oocyte; gonad; right hemisphere of cerebellum; primary visual cortex; prostate; Brodmann area 23; right frontal lobe; seminal vesicula; Brodmann area 9 / Top expressed in: seminiferous tubule; spermatocyte; spermatid; neural layer of retina; seminal vesicula; pineal gland; retinal pigment epithelium; zygote; adrenal gland; right lung lobe; More reference expression data
BioGPS	n/a
Gene ontology
Molecular function	beta-galactosidase activity; hydrolase activity, hydrolyzing O-glycosyl compounds; hydrolase activity; hydrolase activity, acting on glycosyl bonds
Cellular component	vacuole
Biological process	metabolism; carbohydrate metabolic process
Sources:Amigo / QuickGO
Orthologs
Databases	NCBI: entry; OMA: entry
Species	Human	Mouse
Entrez	112937	70893
Ensembl	ENSG00000166105	ENSMUSG00000031966
UniProt	Q8NCI6	A2RSQ1
RefSeq (mRNA)	NM_001080407; NM_138416	NM_001113323
RefSeq (protein)	NP_001073876	NP_001106794
Location (UCSC)	Chr 11: 134.27 – 134.32 Mb	Chr 9: 26.73 – 26.77 Mb
PubMed search
- Wikidata
View/Edit Human	View/Edit Mouse

Galactosidase, beta 1-like 3 is a protein in humans that is encoded by the GLB1L3 gene.
