= TIMM10B =

Protein-coding gene in the species Homo sapiens

Identifiers
- Aliases: TIMM10B, FXC1, TIM10B, Tim9b, translocase of inner mitochondrial membrane 10 homolog B (yeast), translocase of inner mitochondrial membrane 10B
- External IDs: OMIM: 607388; MGI: 1315196; GeneCards: TIMM10B
Available structures
PDB	Ortholog search: PDBe RCSB
PDB	List of PDB id codes 2BSK

Gene location (Human)
Chr.	Chromosome 11 (human)
Band	11p15.4	Start	6,481,501 bp
Band	11p15.4	End	6,484,681 bp

Gene location (Mouse)
Chr.	Chromosome 7 (mouse)
Band	7|7 E3	Start	105,640,056 bp
Band	7|7 E3	End	105,643,637 bp
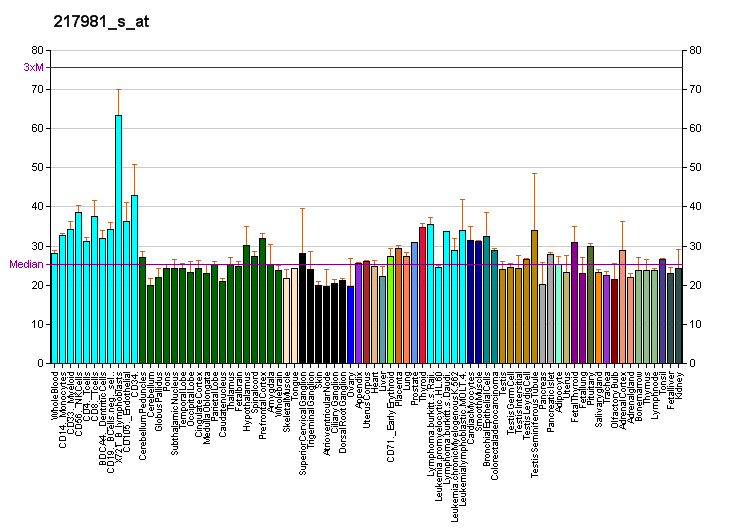
RNA expression pattern
Bgee	Human / Mouse (ortholog); Top expressed in: secondary oocyte; tibia; sperm; gonad; saphenous vein; epithelium of colon; superior vestibular nucleus; spinal ganglia; ventral tegmental area; amniotic fluid / Top expressed in: granulocyte; right kidney; embryo; embryo; muscle of thigh; lip; ventricular zone; superior frontal gyrus; yolk sac; cerebellar cortex; More reference expression data
BioGPS	More reference expression data
Gene ontology
Molecular function	metal ion binding; protein binding
Cellular component	mitochondrial inner membrane; mitochondrial intermembrane space; mitochondrial intermembrane space protein transporter complex; mitochondrion; membrane; TIM22 mitochondrial import inner membrane insertion complex
Biological process	protein transport; protein targeting to mitochondrion; cell-matrix adhesion
Sources:Amigo / QuickGO
Orthologs
Databases	NCBI: entry; OMA: entry
Species	Human	Mouse
Entrez	26515	14356
Ensembl	ENSG00000132286	ENSMUSG00000089847
UniProt	Q9Y5J6	Q9WV96
RefSeq (mRNA)	NM_012192	NM_019502
RefSeq (protein)	NP_036324	NP_062375; NP_001346981; NP_001346982; NP_001346983; NP_001346984 NP_001346985; NP_001346987; NP_001346988; NP_001346989; NP_001346990
Location (UCSC)	Chr 11: 6.48 – 6.48 Mb	Chr 7: 105.64 – 105.64 Mb
PubMed search
- Wikidata
View/Edit Human	View/Edit Mouse

Mitochondrial import inner membrane translocase subunit Tim9 B is an enzyme that in humans is encoded by the FXC1 gene.

FXC1, or TIMM10B, belongs to a family of evolutionarily conserved proteins that are organized in heterooligomeric complexes in the mitochondrial intermembrane space. These proteins mediate the import and insertion of hydrophobic membrane proteins into the mitochondrial inner membrane.[supplied by OMIM]
