= TRPT1 =

Protein-coding gene in the species Homo sapiens

Identifiers
- Aliases: TRPT1, entrez:83707, tRNA phosphotransferase 1
- External IDs: OMIM: 610470; MGI: 1333115; HomoloGene: 12878; GeneCards: TRPT1; OMA:TRPT1 - orthologs

Gene location (Human)
| Chr. | Chromosome 11 (human) |
| Band | 11q13.1 | Start | 64,223,799 bp |
| Band | 11q13.1 | End | 64,226,254 bp |

Gene location (Mouse)
| Chr. | Chromosome 19 (mouse) |
| Band | 19|19 A | Start | 6,973,499 bp |
| Band | 19|19 A | End | 6,976,414 bp |
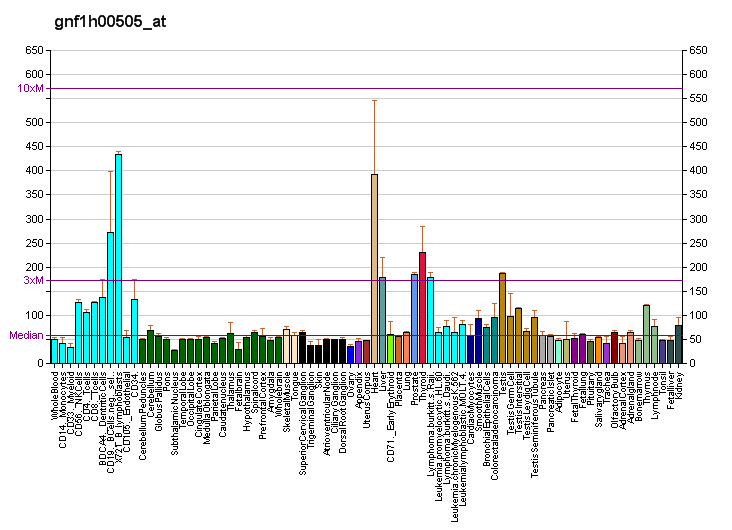
RNA expression pattern
| Bgee | Human / Mouse (ortholog); Top expressed in: gastrocnemius muscle; myocardium of left ventricle; apex of heart; muscle of thigh; mucosa of transverse colon; tibialis anterior muscle; cardiac muscle tissue of right atrium; right auricle of heart; quadriceps femoris muscle; body of pancreas / Top expressed in: interventricular septum; muscle of thigh; skeletal muscle tissue; extraocular muscle; digastric muscle; sternocleidomastoid muscle; triceps brachii muscle; temporal muscle; quadriceps femoris muscle; tibialis anterior muscle; More reference expression data |
| BioGPS | More reference expression data |
Orthologs
| Species | Human | Mouse |
| Entrez | 83707 | 107328 |
| Ensembl | ENSG00000149743 | ENSMUSG00000047656 |
| UniProt | Q86TN4 | Q8K3A2 |
| RefSeq (mRNA) | NM_001033678; NM_001160389; NM_001160390; NM_001160392; NM_001160393 NM_031472; NM_001330298 | NM_153597 |
| RefSeq (protein) | NP_001028850; NP_001153861; NP_001153862; NP_001153864; NP_001153865 NP_001317227; NP_113660; NP_113660.1 | NP_705825 |
| Location (UCSC) | Chr 11: 64.22 – 64.23 Mb | Chr 19: 6.97 – 6.98 Mb |
| PubMed search |
- Wikidata
| View/Edit Human | View/Edit Mouse |

tRNA 2'-phosphotransferase 1 is an enzyme that in humans is encoded by the TRPT1 gene.
