= TMEM25 =

Protein-coding gene in the species Homo sapiens

Identifiers
- Aliases: TMEM25, transmembrane protein 25
- External IDs: OMIM: 613934; MGI: 1918937; GeneCards: TMEM25

Gene location (Human)
Chr.	Chromosome 11 (human)
Band	11q23.3	Start	118,531,041 bp
Band	11q23.3	End	118,547,280 bp

Gene location (Mouse)
Chr.	Chromosome 9 (mouse)
Band	9|9 A5.2	Start	44,793,769 bp
Band	9|9 A5.2	End	44,799,307 bp
RNA expression pattern
Bgee	Human / Mouse (ortholog); Top expressed in: right hemisphere of cerebellum; right frontal lobe; Brodmann area 9; prefrontal cortex; cingulate gyrus; anterior cingulate cortex; nucleus accumbens; anterior pituitary; caudate nucleus; right adrenal cortex / Top expressed in: facial motor nucleus; anterior horn of spinal cord; substantia nigra; left lobe of liver; medial dorsal nucleus; cerebellar cortex; right kidney; medial geniculate nucleus; inferior colliculi; lateral geniculate nucleus; More reference expression data
BioGPS	n/a
Orthologs
Databases	NCBI: entry; OMA: entry
Species	Human	Mouse
Entrez	84866	71687
Ensembl	ENSG00000149582	ENSMUSG00000002032
UniProt	Q86YD3	Q9DCF1
RefSeq (mRNA)	NM_001144034; NM_001144035; NM_001144036; NM_001144037; NM_001144038 NM_032780; NM_001318755; NM_001318757	NM_027865
RefSeq (protein)	NP_001137506; NP_001137507; NP_001137508; NP_001137509; NP_001137510 NP_001305684; NP_001305686; NP_116169	NP_082141; NP_001344312; NP_001344313; NP_001344314; NP_001344315
Location (UCSC)	Chr 11: 118.53 – 118.55 Mb	Chr 9: 44.79 – 44.8 Mb
PubMed search
- Wikidata
View/Edit Human	View/Edit Mouse

Transmembrane protein 25 is a protein that in humans is encoded by the TMEM25 gene.
