= Vesicular glutamate transporter 2 =

Protein-coding gene in the species Homo sapiens

SLC17A6

Identifiers
- Aliases: SLC17A6, DNPI, VGLUT2, solute carrier family 17 member 6
- External IDs: OMIM: 607563; MGI: 2156052; GeneCards: SLC17A6

Gene location (Human)
Chr.	Chromosome 11 (human)
Band	11p14.3	Start	22,338,381 bp
Band	11p14.3	End	22,379,503 bp

Gene location (Mouse)
Chr.	Chromosome 7 (mouse)
Band	7|7 B4	Start	51,271,754 bp
Band	7|7 B4	End	51,320,867 bp
RNA expression pattern
Bgee	Human / Mouse (ortholog); Top expressed in: lateral nuclear group of thalamus; pons; buccal mucosa cell; medulla oblongata; superior vestibular nucleus; middle temporal gyrus; ventral tegmental area; ganglionic eminence; Brodmann area 23; primary visual cortex / Top expressed in: medial dorsal nucleus; pineal gland; mammillary body; habenula; inferior colliculi; ventral tegmental area; dorsomedial hypothalamic nucleus; medial geniculate nucleus; ventromedial nucleus; lateral geniculate nucleus; More reference expression data
BioGPS	n/a
Gene ontology
Molecular function	symporter activity; L-glutamate transmembrane transporter activity; neurotransmitter transmembrane transporter activity
Cellular component	integral component of membrane; neuron projection; cell junction; synapse; synaptic vesicle membrane; membrane; cytoplasmic vesicle; integral component of synaptic vesicle membrane; excitatory synapse
Biological process	neurotransmitter transport; ion transport; sodium ion transport; transport; transmembrane transport; L-glutamate transmembrane transport; synaptic transmission, glutamatergic; regulation of synapse structure or activity; neurotransmitter loading into synaptic vesicle
Sources:Amigo / QuickGO
Orthologs
Databases	NCBI: entry; OMA: entry
Species	Human	Mouse
Entrez	57084	140919
Ensembl	ENSG00000091664	ENSMUSG00000030500
UniProt	Q9P2U8	Q8BLE7
RefSeq (mRNA)	NM_020346	NM_080853; NM_001355150
RefSeq (protein)	NP_065079	NP_543129; NP_001342079
Location (UCSC)	Chr 11: 22.34 – 22.38 Mb	Chr 7: 51.27 – 51.32 Mb
PubMed search
- Wikidata
View/Edit Human	View/Edit Mouse

Vesicular glutamate transporter 2, also known as Solute carrier family 17 member 6, is a protein that in humans is encoded by the SLC17A6 gene.
