= SESN3 =

Protein-coding gene in the species Homo sapiens

Identifiers
- Aliases: SESN3, SEST3, sestrin 3
- External IDs: OMIM: 607768; MGI: 1922997; GeneCards: SESN3

Gene location (Human)
Chr.	Chromosome 11 (human)
Band	11q21	Start	95,165,513 bp
Band	11q21	End	95,232,541 bp

Gene location (Mouse)
Chr.	Chromosome 9 (mouse)
Band	9|9 A1	Start	14,186,363 bp
Band	9|9 A1	End	14,244,397 bp
RNA expression pattern
Bgee	Human / Mouse (ortholog); Top expressed in: sperm; lateral nuclear group of thalamus; retinal pigment epithelium; internal globus pallidus; trigeminal ganglion; mucosa of paranasal sinus; epithelium of nasopharynx; Achilles tendon; spinal ganglia; external globus pallidus / Top expressed in: ventromedial nucleus; lateral septal nucleus; molar; olfactory tubercle; saccule; mammillary body; ciliary body; nucleus accumbens; amygdala; retinal pigment epithelium; More reference expression data
BioGPS	n/a
Gene ontology
Molecular function	oxidoreductase activity; protein binding; oxidoreductase activity, acting on peroxide as acceptor; leucine binding
Cellular component	nucleus; cytoplasm; GATOR2 complex; TORC2 complex
Biological process	regulation of response to reactive oxygen species; negative regulation of TORC1 signaling; response to insulin; glucose homeostasis; regulation of protein kinase B signaling; TORC2 signaling; regulation of insulin receptor signaling pathway; cellular response to amino acid starvation; cellular response to glucose starvation; cellular response to amino acid stimulus; positive regulation of macroautophagy; cellular response to leucine; cellular response to leucine starvation
Sources:Amigo / QuickGO
Orthologs
Databases	NCBI: entry; OMA: entry
Species	Human	Mouse
Entrez	143686	75747
Ensembl	ENSG00000149212	ENSMUSG00000032009
UniProt	P58005	Q9CYP7
RefSeq (mRNA)	NM_001271594; NM_144665	NM_030261
RefSeq (protein)	NP_001258523; NP_653266	NP_084537
Location (UCSC)	Chr 11: 95.17 – 95.23 Mb	Chr 9: 14.19 – 14.24 Mb
PubMed search
- Wikidata
View/Edit Human	View/Edit Mouse

Sestrin 3 is a protein that in humans is encoded by the SESN3 gene.

== Function ==
This gene encodes a member of the sestrin family of stress-induced proteins. The encoded protein reduces the levels of intracellular reactive oxygen species induced by activated Ras downstream of RAC-alpha serine/threonine-protein kinase (Akt) and FoxO transcription factor. The protein is required for normal regulation of blood glucose, insulin resistance and plays a role in lipid storage in obesity. Alternative splicing results in multiple transcript variants.
