= TMEM109 =

Protein-coding gene in the species Homo sapiens

Identifiers
- Aliases: TMEM109, transmembrane protein 109
- External IDs: MGI: 1915789; HomoloGene: 11458; GeneCards: TMEM109; OMA:TMEM109 - orthologs

Gene location (Human)
Chr.	Chromosome 11 (human)
Band	11q12.2	Start	60,914,158 bp
Band	11q12.2	End	60,923,443 bp

Gene location (Mouse)
Chr.	Chromosome 19 (mouse)
Band	19|19 A	Start	10,848,024 bp
Band	19|19 A	End	10,859,365 bp
RNA expression pattern
Bgee	Human / Mouse (ortholog); Top expressed in: thoracic aorta; ascending aorta; right coronary artery; apex of heart; Descending thoracic aorta; body of uterus; left coronary artery; tibial nerve; popliteal artery; tibial arteries / Top expressed in: ascending aorta; aortic valve; tunica media of zone of aorta; tunica adventitia of aorta; conjunctival fornix; vastus lateralis muscle; internal carotid artery; masseter muscle; intercostal muscle; medial head of gastrocnemius muscle; More reference expression data
BioGPS	n/a
Gene ontology
Molecular function	voltage-gated ion channel activity; molecular function; protein binding
Cellular component	sarcoplasmic reticulum membrane; extracellular exosome; endoplasmic reticulum membrane; nucleus; membrane; sarcoplasmic reticulum; nuclear outer membrane; integral component of membrane; endoplasmic reticulum
Biological process	ion transport; negative regulation of cell death; cellular response to gamma radiation; intrinsic apoptotic signaling pathway in response to DNA damage by p53 class mediator; regulation of ion transmembrane transport; transport; ion transmembrane transport
Sources:Amigo / QuickGO
Orthologs
Species	Human	Mouse
Entrez	79073	68539
Ensembl	ENSG00000110108	ENSMUSG00000034659
UniProt	Q9BVC6	Q3UBX0
RefSeq (mRNA)	NM_024092	NM_134142
RefSeq (protein)	NP_076997	NP_598903
Location (UCSC)	Chr 11: 60.91 – 60.92 Mb	Chr 19: 10.85 – 10.86 Mb
PubMed search
- Wikidata
View/Edit Human	View/Edit Mouse

Transmembrane protein 109 is a protein that in humans is encoded by the TMEM109 gene.
