= HBBP1 =

Pseudogene in the species Homo sapiens

Identifiers
- Aliases: HBBP1, HBH1, HBHP, hemoglobin subunit beta pseudogene 1
- External IDs: GeneCards: HBBP1
Orthologs
Databases	NCBI: entry; OMA: entry
Species	Human	Mouse
Entrez	3044	n/a
Ensembl	ENSG00000229988	n/a
UniProt	n a	n/a
RefSeq (mRNA)	n/a	n/a
RefSeq (protein)	n/a	n/a
Location (UCSC)	n/a	n/a
PubMed search		n/a
- Wikidata
View/Edit Human

Hemoglobin, beta pseudogene 1 is a human pseudogene with symbol HBBP1.
