= Small nucleolar RNA host gene 1 =

SNHG1

Identifiers
- Aliases: SNHG1, LINC00057, NCRNA00057, U22HG, UHG, small nucleolar RNA host gene 1, lncRNA16
- External IDs: OMIM: 603222; GeneCards: SNHG1
Orthologs
Databases	NCBI: entry; OMA: entry
Species	Human	Mouse
Entrez	23642	n/a
Ensembl	ENSG00000255717	n/a
UniProt	n a	n/a
RefSeq (mRNA)	n/a	n/a
RefSeq (protein)	n/a	n/a
Location (UCSC)	n/a	n/a
PubMed search		n/a
- Wikidata
View/Edit Human

Small nucleolar RNA host gene 1 is a non-protein coding RNA that in humans is encoded by the SNHG1 gene.

== Function ==
This locus represents a small nucleolar RNA host gene that produces multiple alternatively spliced long non-coding RNAs. This gene is upregulated in cancers and is thought to act as promoter of cell proliferation. This transcript negatively regulates tumor suppressor genes such as tumor protein p53. Expression of this locus may be a marker of tumor progression. [provided by RefSeq, Dec 2017].
