= RNH1 =

Protein-coding gene in the species Homo sapiens

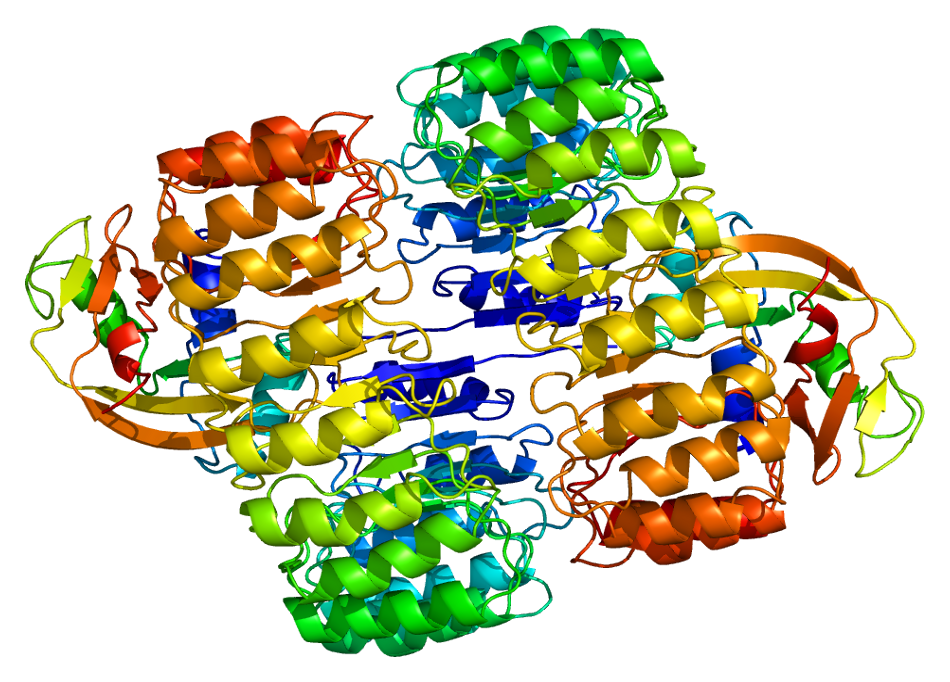
Available structures
PDB	Ortholog search: PDBe RCSB
PDB	List of PDB id codes 1Z7X, 1A4Y, 2BEX, 2Q4G

Identifiers
- Aliases: RNH1, RAI, RNH, ribonuclease/angiogenin inhibitor 1
- External IDs: OMIM: 173320; MGI: 1195456; HomoloGene: 2204; GeneCards: RNH1; OMA:RNH1 - orthologs

Gene location (Human)
Chr.	Chromosome 11 (human)
Band	11p15.5	Start	494,512 bp
Band	11p15.5	End	507,300 bp

Gene location (Mouse)
Chr.	Chromosome 7 (mouse)
Band	7|7 F5	Start	140,740,239 bp
Band	7|7 F5	End	140,752,770 bp
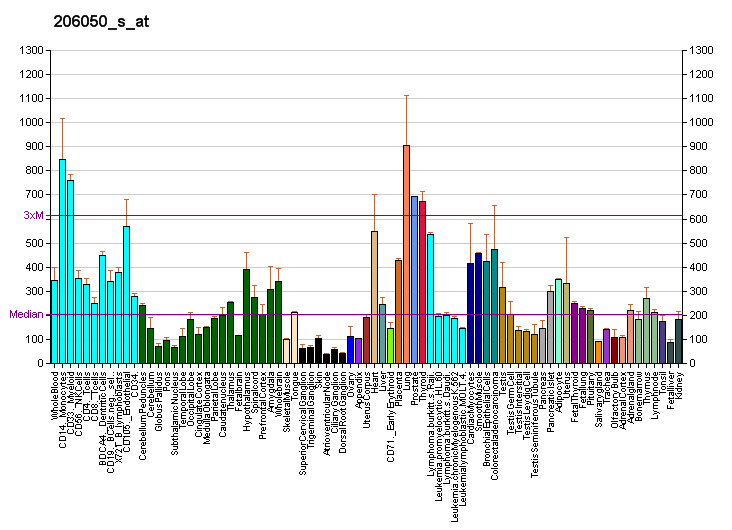
RNA expression pattern
Bgee	Human / Mouse (ortholog); Top expressed in: skin of leg; skin of abdomen; ectocervix; right coronary artery; mucosa of esophagus; vagina; left coronary artery; right auricle of heart; left uterine tube; upper lobe of left lung / Top expressed in: calvaria; gastrula; lip; esophagus; stroma of bone marrow; skin of external ear; endothelial cell of lymphatic vessel; cervix; corneal stroma; umbilical cord; More reference expression data
BioGPS	More reference expression data
Gene ontology
Molecular function	ribonuclease inhibitor activity; protein binding
Cellular component	angiogenin-PRI complex; extracellular exosome; nucleoplasm; cytoplasm; cytosol
Biological process	regulation of angiogenesis; mRNA catabolic process; negative regulation of catalytic activity
Sources:Amigo / QuickGO
Orthologs
Species	Human	Mouse
Entrez	6050	107702
Ensembl	ENSG00000276230; ENSG00000023191	ENSMUSG00000038650
UniProt	P13489	Q91VI7
RefSeq (mRNA)	NM_002939; NM_203383; NM_203384; NM_203385; NM_203386 NM_203387; NM_203388; NM_203389	NM_001172100; NM_001172101; NM_145135
RefSeq (protein)	NP_002930; NP_976317; NP_976318; NP_976319; NP_976320 NP_976321; NP_976322; NP_976323	NP_001165571; NP_001165572; NP_660117
Location (UCSC)	Chr 11: 0.49 – 0.51 Mb	Chr 7: 140.74 – 140.75 Mb
PubMed search
- Wikidata
View/Edit Human	View/Edit Mouse

Ribonuclease inhibitor is an enzyme that in humans is encoded by the RNH1 gene.
