= ZFP91-CNTF =

Non-coding RNA in the species Homo sapiens

Identifiers
- Aliases: ZFP91-CNTF, ZFP91-CNTF readthrough (NMD candidate), ZNF757, ZFP91, Zfp-91
- External IDs: GeneCards: ZFP91-CNTF; OMA:ZFP91-CNTF - orthologs
Orthologs
Species	Human	Mouse
Entrez	386607	n/a
Ensembl	ENSG00000255073	n/a
UniProt	n a	n/a
RefSeq (mRNA)	NM_170768	n/a
RefSeq (protein)	n/a	n/a
Location (UCSC)	n/a	n/a
PubMed search		n/a
- Wikidata
View/Edit Human

Zinc finger protein 91 homolog (mouse), ciliary neurotrophic factor transcription unit, also known as ZFP91-CNTF, is a human gene.

The genes ZFP91 and CNTF are adjacent on chromosome 11. In addition to a monocistronic transcript from each locus, a co-transcribed transcript also exists. The co-transcribed mRNA encodes an isoform of ZFP91 but does not appear to encode a CNTF protein.
