= Suppression of tumorigenicity 2 =

Suppression of tumorigenicity 2 is a gene that in humans is located on chromosome 11p14.3-p12. This region (ST2; GeneID: 6761) on chromosome 11 represents a putative locus that is associated with various forms of cancer.

It has been confused in the published literature with the IL1RL1 gene (GeneID: 9173), which has the alias ST2, but is located on chromosome 2 and encodes a member of the interleukin 1 receptor family, IL1RL1.
