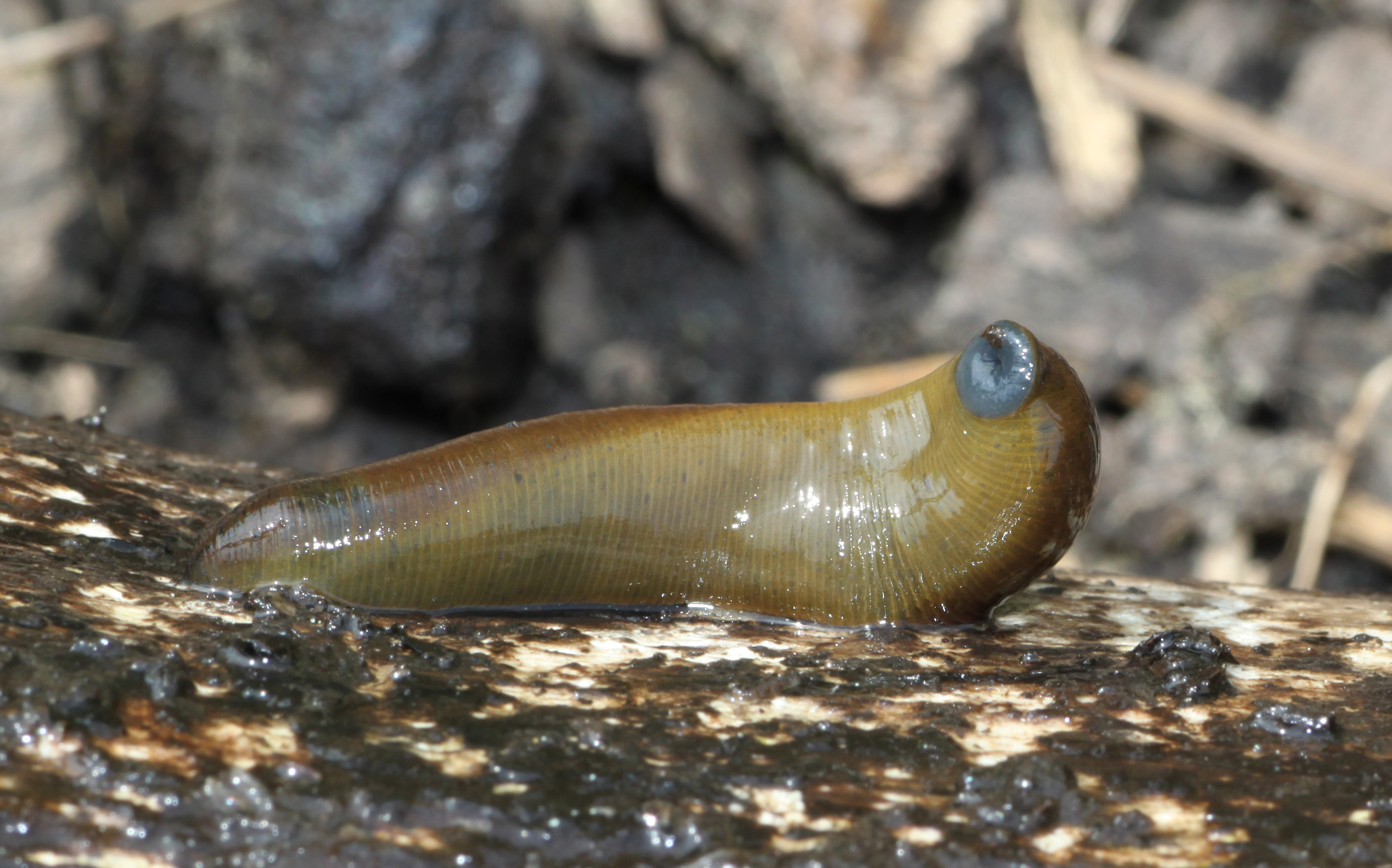

Scientific classification
- Kingdom: Animalia
- Phylum: Annelida
- Clade: Pleistoannelida
- Clade: Sedentaria
- Class: Clitellata
- Subclass: Hirudinea
- Order: Arhynchobdellida
- Family: Haemopidae
- Genus: Haemopis
- Species: H. sanguisuga

Binomial name
- Haemopis sanguisuga (Linnaeus, 1758)

Synonyms
- Hirudo sanguisuga Linnaeus, 1758; Hirudo gulo Braun, 1805; Hirudo vorax Johnson, 1816; Aulastomum gulo (Frič & Vávra, 1892)

= Haemopis sanguisuga =

Species of annelid

Haemopis sanguisuga is a species of freshwater leech in the family Haemopidae. It is commonly called the horse-leech, but that is due to the similarity of its appearance to the leech Limnatis nilotica, which sometimes enters the nasal cavities of livestock. Haemopis sanguisuga does not behave in this way. Another synonym for this leech is Aulastomum gulo.

== Description ==
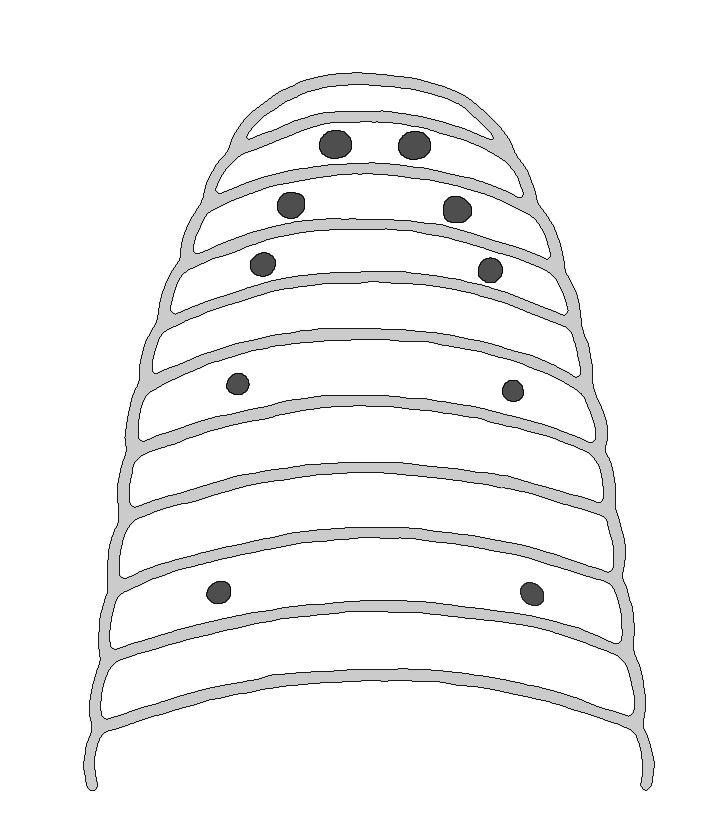
Head of Haemopis Sanguisuga with five pairs of eyes

Haemopis sanguisuga can reach a length of 10 cm (4 in), a similar size to the medicinal leech Hirudo medicinalis, but can extend to a greater length when stretched out. The body is segmented; the upper surface is brownish-black, usually a solid colour but sometimes with streaks and spots, and the under surface is yellowish-grey or olive. There are two suckers, a small one at the anterior end and a larger one at the posterior end. There is a crescent-shaped grouping of five pairs of eyes on the head.

== Distribution and habitat ==
Haemopis sanguisuga is a freshwater leech and is found across most of Europe as well as in Asia. Typical habitats are in shallow parts of lakes, ponds, ditches and slow-moving rivers. It may emerge onto the land, hiding under stones, and it tolerates slightly brackish water. It can be found as far as 30 metres away from water.

Haemopis sanguisuga in a lab

== Ecology ==
Haemopis sanguisuga moves by looping, attaching its front sucker to the substrate, drawing forward the back sucker and positioning it close to the front one, and then detaching the front sucker and extending its front end forward. It can also move by swimming. It has a few blunt teeth in two rows and is a predator rather than a blood-sucker. It feeds on insect larvae, fish eggs and fry, tadpoles, worms, other leeches, and gastropods; the prey is sucked in and swallowed whole. The leech sometimes emerges from the water to hunt for earthworms.

Like other leeches, Haemopis sanguisuga is a hermaphrodite. The testes mature first and the ovaries later in the organism's life. A pair of leeches will line up with the clitellar regions in contact, and sperm is passes by the one acting as male to the female gonopore. Some time later, several eggs are laid by the female, and these are wrapped in an albumin-filled cocoon that is secreted by the clitellum. The cocoon is buried in damp earth close to the water's edge. When the eggs hatch, the juveniles that emerge are about 15 mm (0.6 in) in length.

A parasitic diplomonad, Hexamita gigas, is sometimes found in the leech's gut. Most species of Hexamita infect vertebrates, and the only other known invertebrate hosts for this genus of flagellates are found among the cockroaches, such as the oriental cockroach (Blatta orientalis).
