= Hirudinaria (annelid) =

Scientific classification
- Kingdom: Animalia
- Phylum: Annelida
- Clade: Pleistoannelida
- Clade: Sedentaria
- Class: Clitellata
- Subclass: Hirudinea
- Order: Arhynchobdellida
- Suborder: Hirudiniformes
- Family: Cylicobdellidae
- Genus: Hirudinaria; Whitman, 1886

Genus of leeches

Hirudinaria is a genus of large Asian leeches belonging to the family Cylicobdellidae; previously it was placed in the Hirudinidae. (Note: Note: Hirudinaria Scacchi, 1833 is now accepted as Galeomma Turton, 1825 in the bivalve Mollusc family Galeommatidae.) It includes species such as H. manillensis that may be called "Asian medicinal leeches", but together with the genus Poecilobdella, they are also described as Asian buffalo leeches.

== Species ==
The Global Biodiversity Information Facility lists:

1. Hirudinaria bpling Phillips, 2012
2. Hirudinaria javanica (Wahlberg, 1855) - type species
3. Hirudinaria manillensis (Lesson, 1842)
4. Hirudinaria thailandica Jeratthitikul & Panha, 2020
5. Hirudinaria viridis Moore, 1927

Basionym now in genus Poecilobdella:

- Hirudinaria blanchardi Moore, 1901
