= Poecilobdella =

Scientific classification
- Kingdom: Animalia
- Phylum: Annelida
- Clade: Pleistoannelida
- Clade: Sedentaria
- Class: Clitellata
- Subclass: Hirudinea
- Order: Arhynchobdellida
- Suborder: Hirudiniformes
- Family: Hirudinidae
- Genus: Poecilobdella; Blanchard, 1893

Genus of leeches

Poecilobdella is a genus of Asian leeches belonging to the family Hirudinidae. Together with the genus Hirudinaria, they have been called Asian buffalo (or cattle) leeches.

== Species ==
The Global Biodiversity Information Facility lists:

1. Poecilobdella blanchardi (Moore, 1901) - type species
  - previously placed in subgenus: Limnatis (Poecilobdella) Blanchard, 1893
2. Poecilobdella hubeiensis Yang, 1980
3. Poecilobdella nanjingensis Yang, 1996

Now placed in the genus Hirudinaria:

- Poecilobdella javanica (Wahlberg, 1855)
- Poecilobdella manillensis (Lesson, 1842)
