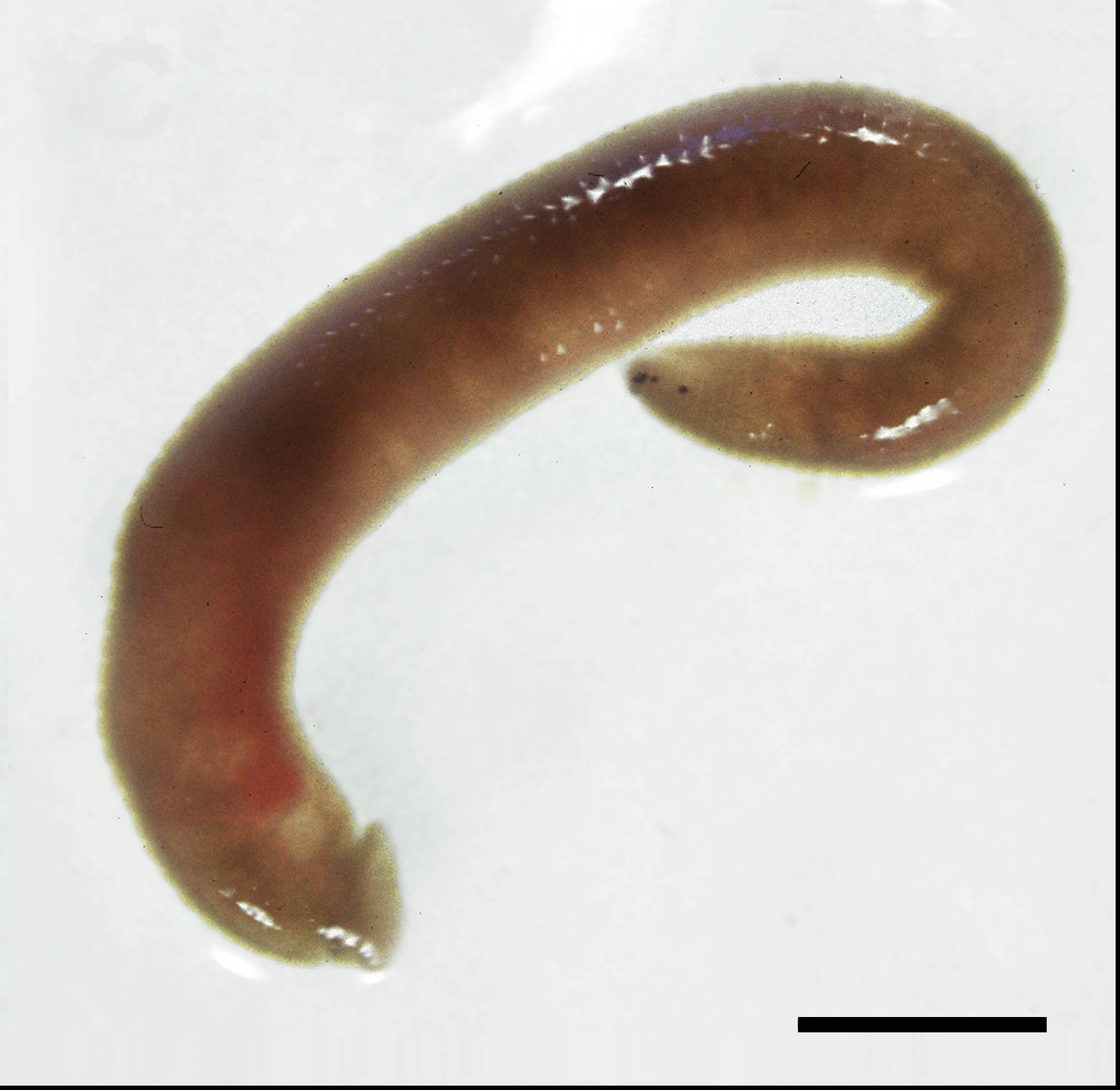
- Xerobdella lecomtei

Scientific classification
- Kingdom: Animalia
- Phylum: Annelida
- Clade: Pleistoannelida
- Clade: Sedentaria
- Class: Clitellata
- Subclass: Hirudinea
- Order: Arhynchobdellida
- Suborder: Hirudiniformes
- Family: Xerobdellidae
- Genus: Xerobdella von Frauenfeld, 1868

= Xerobdella =

Genus of annelid worms

Xerobdella is a genus of annelids belonging to the family Xerobdellidae.

== Species ==
GBIF lists:

1. Xerobdella anulata Autrum, 1958
2. Xerobdella lecomtei von Frauenfeld, 1868
3. Xerobdella praealpina Minelli, 1971
