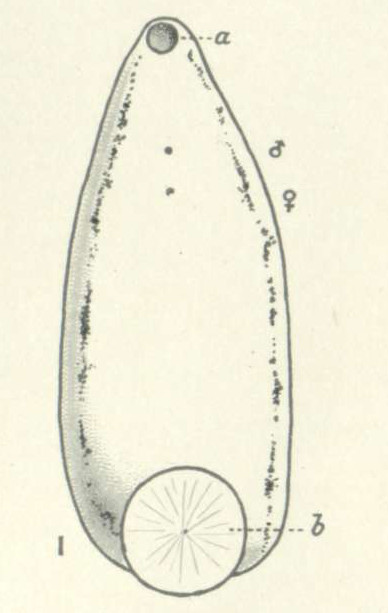

Scientific classification
- Kingdom: Animalia
- Phylum: Annelida
- Clade: Pleistoannelida
- Clade: Sedentaria
- Class: Clitellata
- Subclass: Hirudinea
- Order: Arhynchobdellida
- Family: Hirudinidae
- Genus: Hirudobdella
- Species: H. antipodum

Binomial name
- Hirudobdella antipodum (Benham, 1904)

= Hirudobdella antipodum =

Species of annelid worm

Hirudobdella antipodum is a terrestrial leech found only on the Open Bay Islands in New Zealand. It preys on the feet of nesting seabirds. Its numbers have been reduced significantly by introduced weka, and the entire remnant population of the leech is now living beneath a single boulder.

== Discovery ==
The leech was discovered when botanist Leonard Cockayne and Walter Dunlop (an analytical chemist from Orepuki) visited Taumaka, the largest of the Open Bay Islands, in February 1903. Dunlop was looking for wētā in muttonbird burrows when he was bitten on the wrist. As Benham put it, in his description of the new species, "Fortunately Mr Dunlop is keenly interested in natural history, and he carefully withdrew his hand and found a leech attached thereto”.

Subsequently, weka (Gallirallus australis) were introduced to the Open Bay Islands, and by 1969 these were thought to have driven the leech to extinction. The species was rediscovered in 1987, however, living in waterlogged penguin burrows underneath a large (5 m × 2 m) glacial boulder. Repeated surveys of the boulder over the next decade confirmed that the leeches, the entire world population known at that time, were surviving and breeding.

== Biology ==
Terrestrial leeches require damp or wet environments to keep their skin moist and dispose of excreted ammonia, and so are normally found in forest. On the Open Bay Islands, H. antipodum was found in wet burrows or in waterlogged piles of sticks.

Terrestrial leeches primarily feed on mammals, though the New Zealand species have adapted to rely on birds. The Open Bay Islands leech feeds primarily on the feet of nesting seabirds, especially Fiordland penguins (Eudyptes pachyrhynchus). Leeches are able to ingest several times their body weight in blood, and can take months to digest it. Outside of the breeding season, H. antipodum may feed opportunistically on other vertebrates, such as fur seals, or even earthworms. New Zealand terrestrial leeches may have once been opportunistic feeders of even active forest birds, such as the extinct moa.

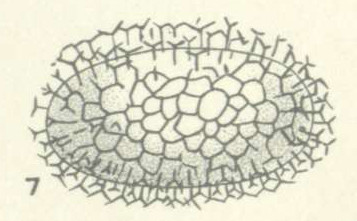
The cocoon of H. antipodum, from Benham (1904)

Leeches are hermaphrodites, with both male and female genital pores. Those in the order Arhynchobdellida lay 5–10 eggs in cocoons. When Cockayne and Dunlop discovered this species, their initial search located six more individuals and two empty cocoons, which were oval, 14 mm long, and dark brown with a horny texture.

== Conservation ==
The main cause of decline in numbers of this leech is suspected to be predation by weka (Gallirallus australis), as the Open Bay Islands have no mammalian predators such as rats and mice. Although a New Zealand native bird, weka were introduced to the islands from both the North and South Island in the 1900s. They prey on nesting seabirds, their eggs, the Open Bay Islands gecko (Mokopirirakau sp.), Open Bay Islands skink (Oligosoma taumakae), and invertebrates in general. Because H. antipodum is active during the day and will cross areas of open ground, it is very susceptible to weka predation.

Proposals by the Department of Conservation to eradicate weka from the islands have been opposed by the islands' owners, Māori of the iwi Poutini Ngai Tahu, who were partly responsible for introducing the birds. DOC have also suggested maintaining a captive population of the leeches in case they are driven extinct on the island.

One problem with conservation of this species is that it is not as charismatic as a bird or fur seal; as biologist Colin Miskelly put it, "…trying to get community buy-in for protecting the Open Bay Island leech – it’s just not going to happen, because who gives a stuff about a leech."
