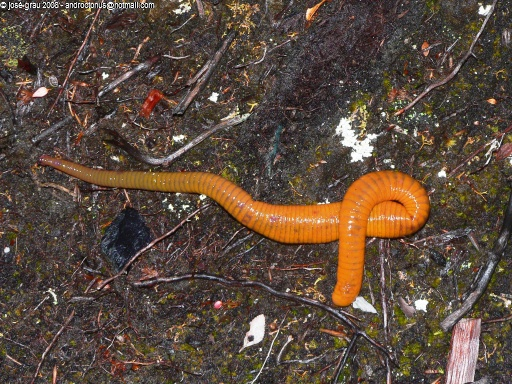

Scientific classification
- Kingdom: Animalia
- Phylum: Annelida
- Clade: Pleistoannelida
- Clade: Sedentaria
- Class: Clitellata
- Subclass: Hirudinea
- Order: Arhynchobdellida
- Suborder: Erpobdelliformes
- Family: Americobdellidae; Caballero, 1956
- Genus: Americobdella; Caballero, 1956
- Species: A. valdiviana

Binomial name
- Americobdella valdiviana (Philippi, 1872)

Synonyms
- Macrobdella valdiviana Philippi, 1872

= Americobdella =

Genus of annelid worms

Americobdella is a genus of carnivorous leeches from southern Chile, comprising only the species, Americobdella valdiviana.

== Taxonomy ==
Philippi, who originally classified A. valdiviana as an erpobdellid leech, noted that Americobdella valdiviana was similar to Trocheta (now synonymized with Erpobdella) "in both appearance and habit". It is phylogenically between two major groups of leeches, the Rhynchobdellida and the Arhynchobdellida. Recent work has suggested A. valdiviana is more closely related to the Erpobdelliformes than the Hirudiniformes.

== Description ==
Americobdella valdiviana is a predator and has only rudimentary jaws. Because of these features, it was originally classified as an erpobdellid leech. A. valdiviana is grey-coloured on the dorsal side with a yellowish ventral side. Whether eyes are present in this species is a matter of debate. While Philippi originally described Americobdella valdiviana as having no eyes, other authors have indicated that eyes are indeed present.

== Diet ==
Americobdella valdiviana feeds on earthworms.
