= Gastrostomobdellidae =

Scientific classification
- Domain: Eukaryota
- Kingdom: Animalia
- Phylum: Annelida
- Clade: Pleistoannelida
- Clade: Sedentaria
- Class: Clitellata
- Subclass: Hirudinea
- Order: Arhynchobdellida
- Suborder: Erpobdelliformes
- Family: Gastrostomobdellidae

Family of annelids

Gastrostomobdellidae is a family of annelids belonging to the order Arhynchobdellida.

Genera:

- Gastrostomobdella Moore, 1929
- Kumabdella Richardson, 1971
