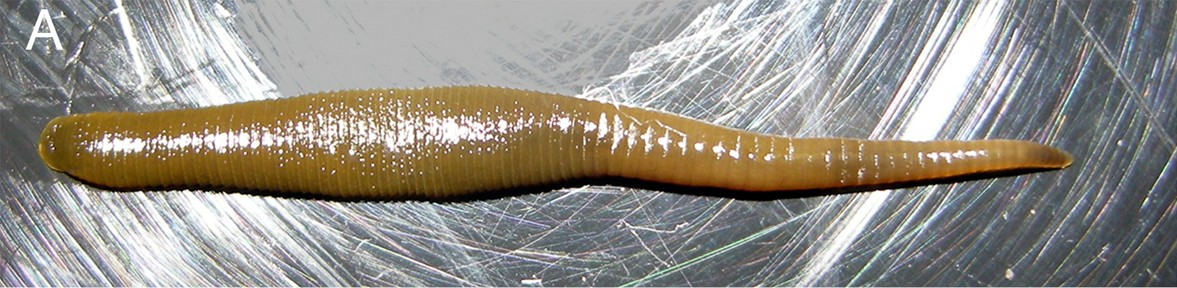

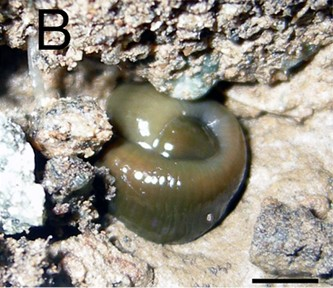
- Dorsal view of Orobdella masaakikuroiwai (top) and a live animal under a stone (bottom)

Scientific classification
- Kingdom: Animalia
- Phylum: Annelida
- Clade: Pleistoannelida
- Clade: Sedentaria
- Class: Clitellata
- Subclass: Hirudinea
- Order: Arhynchobdellida
- Suborder: Erpobdelliformes
- Family: Orobdellidae; Nakano, Ramlah and Hikida, 2012
- Genus: Orobdella; Oka, 1895

= Orobdella =

Genus of leeches

Orobdella is a genus of leeches. It is the only genus in the monotypic family Orobdellidae. They are large annelids, with the largest species (Orobdella octonaria) exceeding 20 cm (7.9 in) in length, but some are much smaller: mature individuals of Orobdella koikei can measure only 4 cm (1.6 in). They inhabit the banks of mountain streams and feed on earthworms. The majority of species are endemic to Japan; two species are known from Taiwan, one from Korea, and one from Russian Far East.

== Species ==
Orobdella contains 21 species, including the following:

- Orobdella dolichopharynx Nakano, 2011
- Orobdella esulcata Nakano, 2010
- Orobdella ghilarovi Nakano and Prozorova, 2019
- Orobdella ijimai Oka, 1895
- Orobdella kawakatsuorum Richardson, 1975
- Orobdella koikei Nakano, 2012
- Orobdella ketagalan Nakano and Lai, 2012
- Orobdella koikei Nakano, 2012
- Orobdella masaakikuroiwai Nakano, 2014
- Orobdella mononoke Nakano, 2012
- Orobdella octonaria Oka, 1895
- Orobdella shimadae Nakano, 2011
- Orobdella tsushimensis Nakano, 2011
- Orobdella whitmani Oka, 1895
