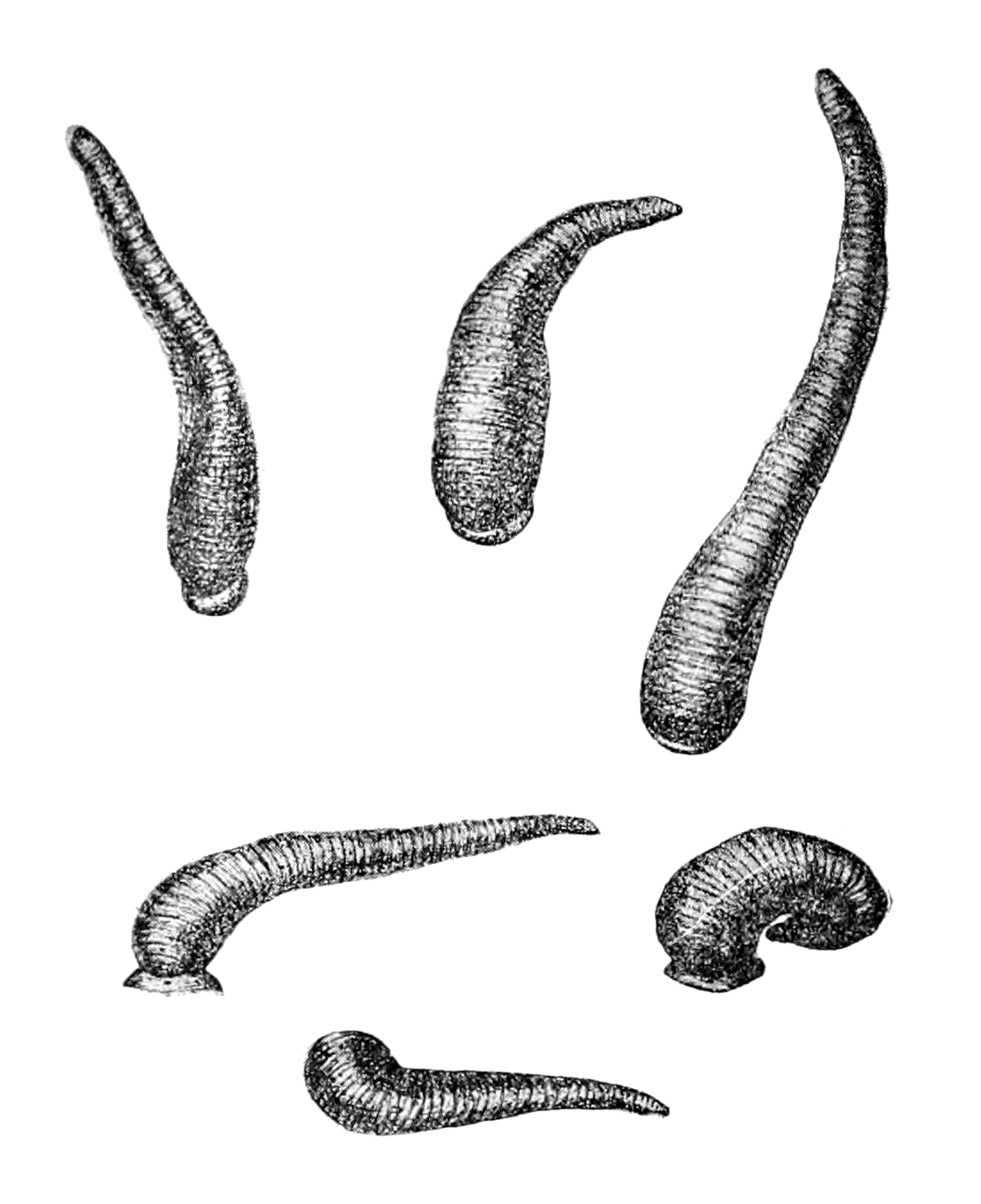
- Limnatis nilotica movement

Scientific classification
- Kingdom: Animalia
- Phylum: Annelida
- Clade: Pleistoannelida
- Clade: Sedentaria
- Class: Clitellata
- Subclass: Hirudinea
- Order: Arhynchobdellida
- Family: Hirudinidae
- Genus: Limnatis
- Species: L. nilotica

Binomial name
- Limnatis nilotica (Savigny, 1822)

= Limnatis nilotica =

Species of annelid worm

Limnatis nilotica is a species of leech in the family Hirudinidae. It is hematophagous (feeding on blood), living on the mucous membranes of mammals.

== Description ==
Limnatis nilotica grows to a length of about 10 cm (4 in). It has powerful jaws and a sucker at both the anterior and the posterior end. The general colour is dark green and there are green spots in rows on the dorsal surface and bands of yellowish-orange and green on the sides.

== Distribution and habitat ==
Limnatis nilotica is native to Southern Europe, North Africa and the Middle East. It inhabits stagnant ponds and shallow lakes.

== Biology ==
Limnatis nilotica is unable to pierce skin with its jaws which are relatively small, soft and rounded; there are about thirty flat teeth with rough surfaces on the jaws, and small papillae which probably secrete saliva. Instead it enters its mammalian host through an orifice and sucks blood from mucous membranes inside the host, often the pharynx. The ingested blood is granular in nature, perhaps because the leech has scraped the tissues as it fed. The volume of blood consumed at any one time is much smaller than is typical for the European medicinal leech, but L. nilotica may stay in place for several weeks, feeding at intervals.

Limnatis nilotica is periodically reported as affecting humans and livestock, entering the host through the mouth, nose, and occasionally through the eye socket, the urethra or vagina. In Iran, a pregnant cow showed respiratory distress and anaemia and was found to have a leech attached to the inside of the cheek and tongue; the cow was said to have drunk from a local pond. In another instance, a camel in Iraq had leeches inside its nasal cavity. There have been other reports from Iraq of affected cattle, sheep, donkeys and dogs. Two young dogs in Iran with symptoms including anorexia, anaemia, hyper-salivation, retching, and bleeding from the mouth, were found to have leeches under their tongues. If left untreated animals may die, but these dogs recovered after the leeches were removed.
