= Hirudinaria manillensis =

Scientific classification
- Kingdom: Animalia
- Phylum: Annelida
- Clade: Pleistoannelida
- Clade: Sedentaria
- Class: Clitellata
- Subclass: Hirudinea
- Order: Arhynchobdellida
- Family: Cylicobdellidae
- Genus: Hirudinaria
- Species: H. manillensis

Binomial name
- Hirudinaria manillensis Lesson, 1842

Parasitic segmented worm

Hirudinaria manillensis, also known as the Asian buffalo leech, is a species of parasitic segmented worms native to the Southeast Asian region.

== Distribution and habitat ==
Hirudinaria manillensis are primarily found in the Philippines Bangladesh, China, Thailand, Sri Lanka, Indonesia, Malaysia, and Singapore. Specifically in Singapore the species are found in waterlogged swamps and streams.

== Anatomy ==
Hirudinaria manillensis are bilaterally symmetrical multicellular organisms. The organism possesses an olive-green underbelly, brown middle color line, and black stripes along its sides. They are made up of multiple segments that are close together with their lower segment containing a black color. Additionally, the species has a jaw with approximately 148 teeth per jaw. The leech moves by anchoring its posterior sucker on a surface and extending its body in the desired direction. The rest of the body is then pulled towards the anterior sucker. Hirudinaria manillensis also possesses the ability to swim by flattening itself in a dorsal ventral manner and swaying similar to a snake

Blood anticoagulants are naturally occurring proteins created in the salivary glands of the leech. The blood anticoagulants inhibit procoagulant activity of thrombin, preventing the conversion of fibrinogen into fibrin.

== Diet ==
Hirudinaria manillensis are parasitic, feeding on the blood of primarily large vertebrates such as mammals.

== Reproduction ==
Hirudinaria manillensis are hermaphroditic having both male and female reproductive organs. Cross fertilization is required to reproduce, and the leech possess an eversible penis that is inserted in the vagina of another mate. Head-to-tail position is possible but unilateral action is more common.

== Relevance to humans ==
Hirudinaria manillensis were commonly used for phelebotomy, having been recorded for over 3000 years in ancient Egypt. Believed to restore the balance of the four humours, blood, phelgm, cholar, and melancholy the practice of bloodletting reached its peak in 19th century Europe. In current times phelebotomy is used to treat conditions such as hemochromatosis and porphyria cutanea tarda.
