= Hirudobdella =

Scientific classification
- Kingdom: Animalia
- Phylum: Annelida
- Clade: Pleistoannelida
- Clade: Sedentaria
- Class: Clitellata
- Subclass: Hirudinea
- Order: Arhynchobdellida
- Family: Hirudinidae
- Genus: Hirudobdella; Goddard, 1910

Genus of leeches

Hirudobdella is a genus of annelids belonging to the family Hirudinidae.

Species:

- Hirudobdella antipodum (Benham, 1904)
- Hirudobdella benhami Mason, 1976
