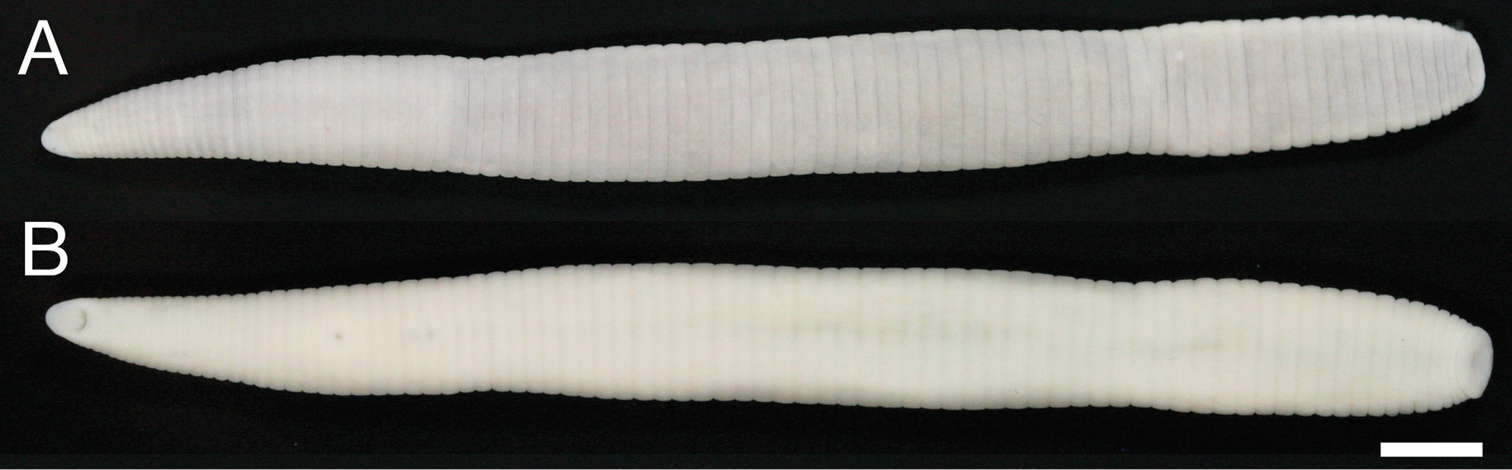
- Holotype of Orobdella ketagalan. A Dorsal and B ventral views. Scale bar = 5 mm.

Scientific classification
- Domain: Eukaryota
- Kingdom: Animalia
- Phylum: Annelida
- Clade: Pleistoannelida
- Clade: Sedentaria
- Class: Clitellata
- Subclass: Hirudinea
- Order: Arhynchobdellida
- Family: Orobdellidae
- Genus: Orobdella
- Species: O. ketagalan

Binomial name
- Orobdella ketagalan Nakano and Lai, 2012

= Orobdella ketagalan =

Species of annelid

Orobdella ketagalan is a species of terrestrial leech in the order Arhynchobdellida, the proboscisless leeches. It is endemic to northern Taiwan. It is known from the vicinity of Taipei, including its type locality, Yangmingshan National Park. The specific name refers to the native Taiwanese Ketagalan people inhabiting the area. The closest known relative of Orobdella ketagalan is Orobdella meisai from southern Taiwan, followed by Orobdella dolichopharynx and Orobdella shimadae from the Ryukyu Islands (Japan).

== Description ==
Orobdella ketagalan has firm, muscular, and elongated body that gains streadily in width in the caudal direction. The body is dorso-ventral depressed, with the sides nearly parallel from mid-length to the point just anterior to the caudal sucker. The caudal sucker is ventral, oval, and smaller in diameter than the body width. There are three pairs of eyes. Living individuals are dorsally grayish, slightly darker in the first third of the dorsum. The ventral surface is whitish. The maximum body length is 112 mm (4.4 in) and body width is 10.3 mm (0.4 in).

== Habitat ==
Leeches of the genus Orobdella are terrestrial, inhabit the banks of mountain streams, and feed on earthworms. The type series of Orobdella ketagalan was collected at elevations of 600–779 m (1,969–2,556 ft) above sea level.
