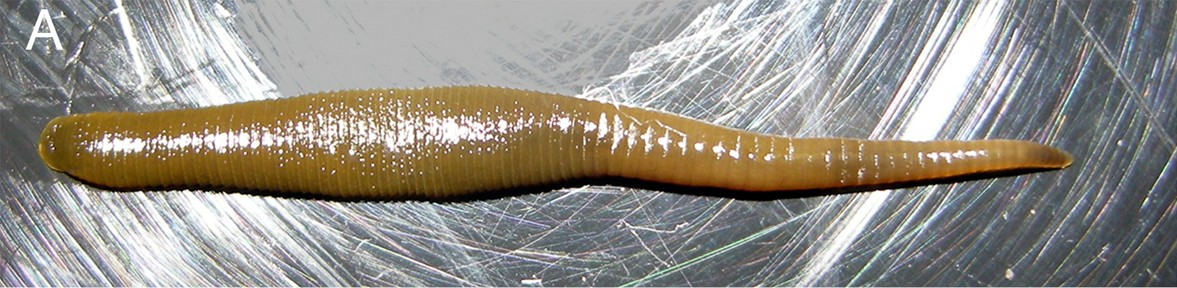

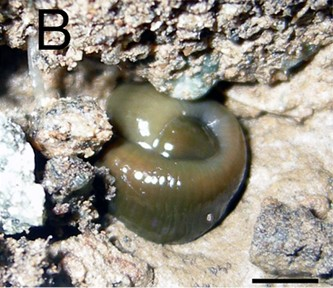
- Dorsal view of live specimen (top) and live animal under a stone (bottom)

Scientific classification
- Domain: Eukaryota
- Kingdom: Animalia
- Phylum: Annelida
- Clade: Pleistoannelida
- Clade: Sedentaria
- Class: Clitellata
- Subclass: Hirudinea
- Order: Arhynchobdellida
- Family: Orobdellidae
- Genus: Orobdella
- Species: O. masaakikuroiwai

Binomial name
- Orobdella masaakikuroiwai Nakano, 2014
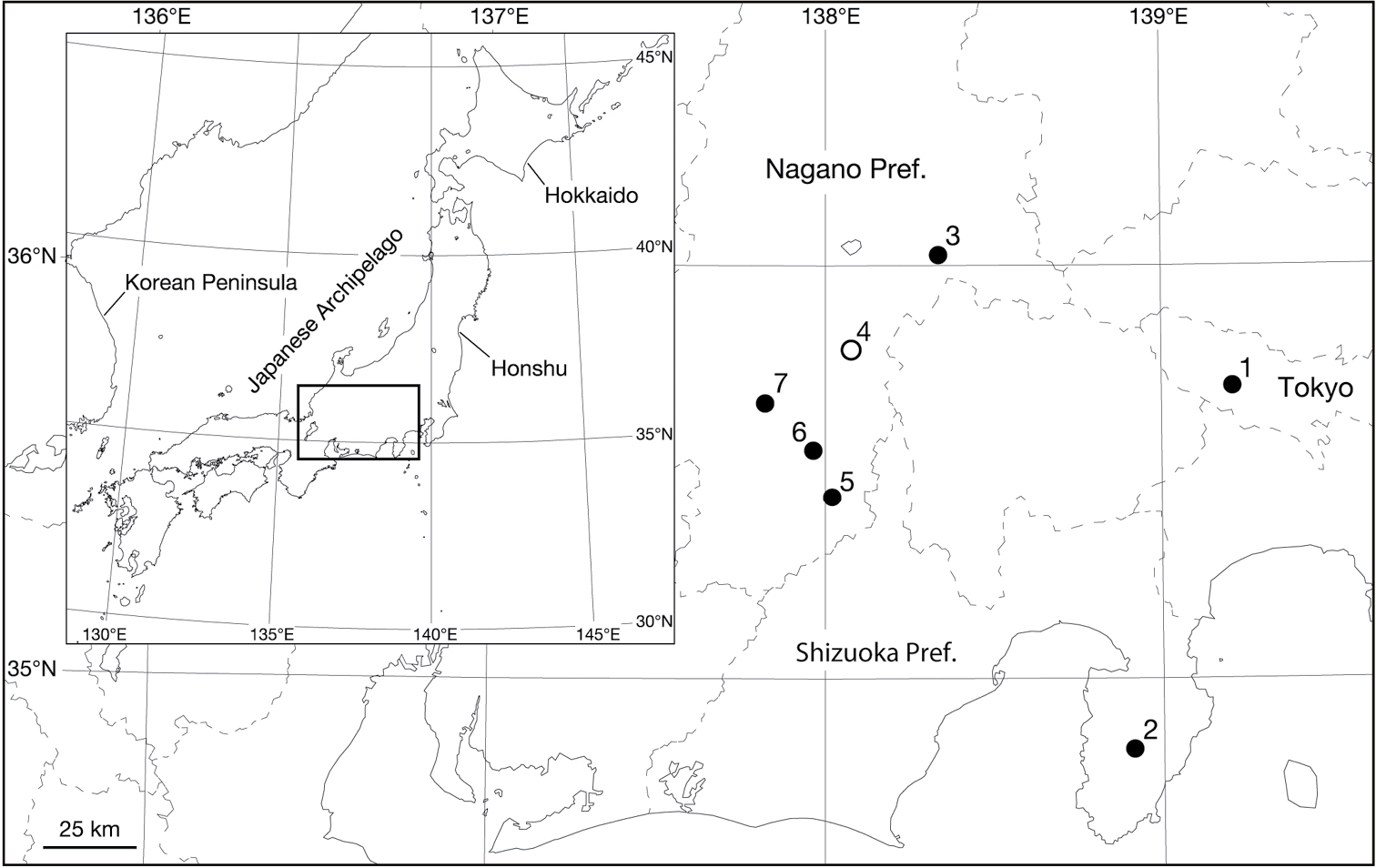
- Collection sites for O. masaakikuroiwai

= Orobdella masaakikuroiwai =

Species of annelid worm

Orobdella masaakikuroiwai is a species of proboscisless leech from Japan.

== Etymology ==
The name is a contraction of Masaaki Kuroiwa, who was part of the survey of the Nagano Prefecture.

== Description ==
Mature individuals are smaller than 4 centimetres (1.6 in) long, making them one of the smallest species in their genus beside O. koikei. The species has a flattened, elongate muscular body. The caudal sucker is positioned on the ventral surface. It has three pairs of eyes. General coloration is whitish brown, brown, or whitish yellow, with a greyish or yellowish white underbelly.

== Range and habitat ==
O. masaakikuroiwai is found in mountainous parts of Honshu island, in the eastern and southeastern parts of the Nagano Prefecture. It was also found in mountainous areas of the Greater Tokyo Area and around Mount Amagi on the Izu Peninsula. Specimens were collected between 230 metres (750 ft) and 1,860 metres (6,100 ft) above sea level.

Individuals are usually found in moist areas, usually under stones or leaves.

== Behavior ==
=== Reproduction ===
The species is believed to begin breeding in mid-to-late July.

=== Diet ===
Due to the discovery of soil particles in the leeches' digestive tracts, Nakano (2014) concluded that the species feeds on earthworms like other members of the genus Orobdella.
