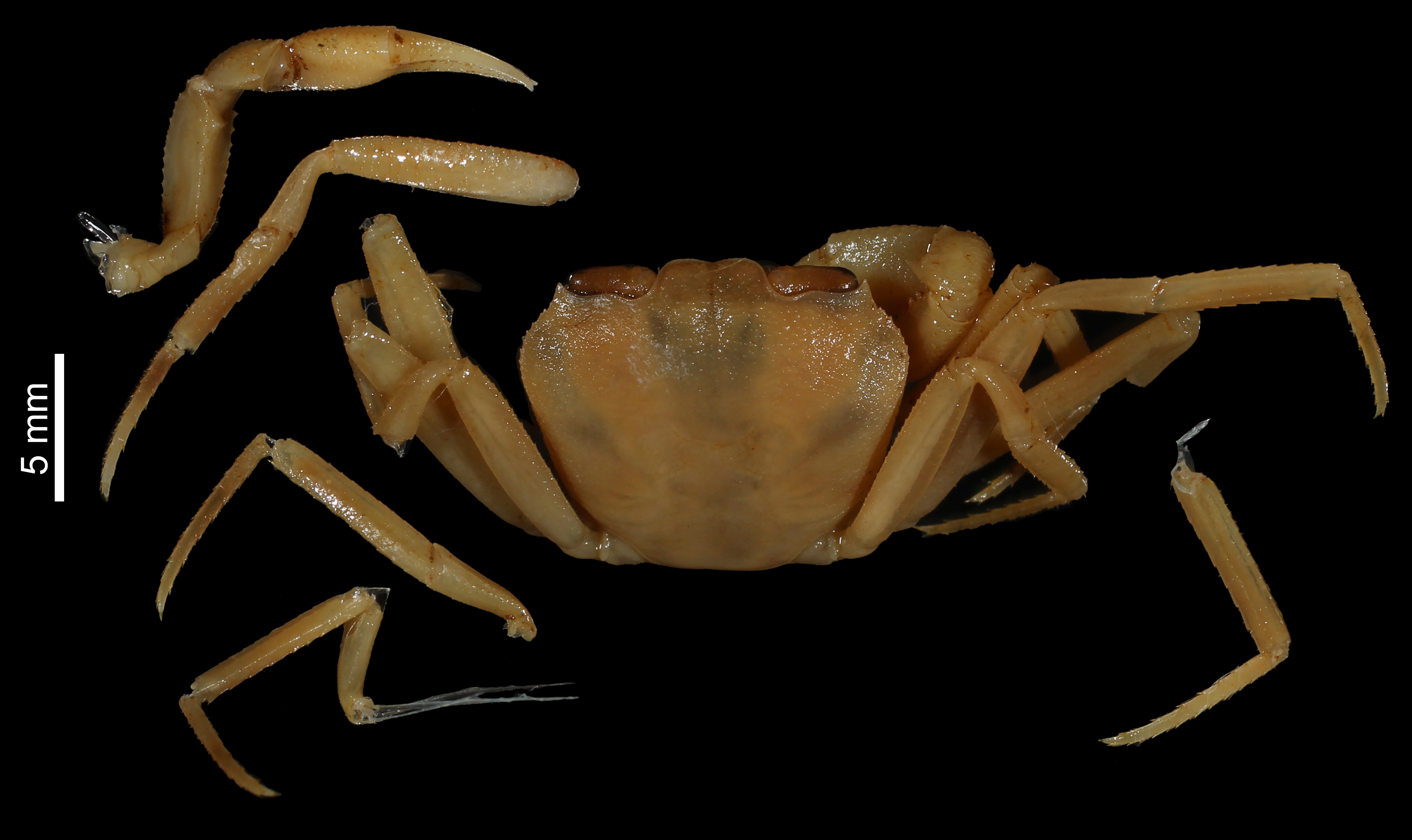
- Tiwaripotamon araneum

Scientific classification
- Kingdom: Animalia
- Phylum: Arthropoda
- Clade: Pancrustacea
- Class: Malacostraca
- Order: Decapoda
- Suborder: Pleocyemata
- Infraorder: Brachyura
- Family: Potamidae
- Subfamily: Potamiscinae
- Genus: Tiwaripotamon; Bott (1970)

= Tiwaripotamon =

Genus of crabs

Tiwaripotamon is a genus of freshwater crabs in the family Potamiscinae. Records of occurrence are from southern China and northern Vietnam.

== Species ==
- Tiwaripotamon annamense (Balss, 1914)
- Tiwaripotamon araneum (Rathbun, 1904)
- Tiwaripotamon austenianum (Wood-Mason, 1871)
- Tiwaripotamon edostilus Ng & Yeo, 2001
- Tiwaripotamon pingguoense Dai & Naiyanetr, 1994
- Tiwaripotamon vietnamicum (Dang & Hô, 2002)
- Tiwaripotamon vixuyenense Shih & Do, 2014
- Tiwaripotamon xiurenense Dai & Naiyanetr, 1994
