= Open Bay Islands =

Island group in New Zealand

- Location within New Zealand

Geography
- Location: Westland District
- Coordinates: 43°52′S 168°53′E
- Total islands: 2
- Highest elevation: 30 m (100 ft)

Administration
- New Zealand

Demographics
- Population: (?)

The Open Bay Islands are located in South Westland, off the south-west coast of the South Island of New Zealand. They consist of two main islands, Taumaki and Popotai, plus several smaller islets and rocks. They lie approximately 5 km (3.1 mi) offshore from the Okuru River mouth, near Haast, and are owned by the West Coast branch Māori iwi Ngāi Tahu known as Poutini Ngāi Tahu.

Taumaki is the larger island (14.7 ha or 36 acres, 660 m or 722 yd long and 260 m or 284 yd wide reaching a plateau 21 m or 69 ft above sea level) and is separated from Popotai (2.2 ha or 5.4 acres, 400 m or 437 yd long and 200 m or 219 yd wide) by a narrow channel.

== Wildlife ==
The Open Bay Islands support several endemic species, including a terrestrial leech (Hirudobdella antipodum), an undescribed gecko species (aff. Hoplodactylus granulatus), and a skink (Oligosoma taumakae). In 2010 the skink was discovered on the Barn Islands, two rock stacks near Haast, as well as a terrestrial leech likely to be Hirudobdella antipodum; the gecko, however, has only ever been recorded from Taumaki Island, and only 15 have been seen.

Taumaki Island has been identified as an Important Bird Area by BirdLife International because it is a breeding site for Fiordland penguins. New Zealand fur seals currently numbering in the thousands have recolonized the islands following the end of commercial sealing. Hector's dolphins and bottlenose dolphins (occasional) are present at Jackson Bay, and migratory southern right and humpback whales are also present. Great white sharks have also been confirmed in the area.

=== Wekas ===
Although introduced mammals are not known ever to have reached the Open Bay Islands, the introduction of weka (a native flightless rail, Gallirallus australis) from the South Island in the early 1900s has had an adverse impact on the flora and fauna of the islands. The Department of Conservation have recommended to the Minister of Conservation that weka should be removed from the islands. The Trust which governs the island has agreed to removal on the condition that they are not killed.

== Castaways ==
The sealer Active, brought a ten-man sealing gang from Sydney to the islands. The men had very basic provisions: some food, salt, an axe, an adze, and a cooper's drawing knife. The ship, which left the islands on 16 February 1810, was not seen again, and the sealing gang was assumed to have been lost with the ship. After years of considerable hardship, they finally saw a ship, the Governor Bligh, and attracted its attention. They were picked up and arrived back in Sydney on 15 December 1813.

The men's fate has been turned into a song, Davy Low'ston, that tells their ordeal.

== See also ==
- Islands of New Zealand
- List of islands
- Desert island
