= Tiwaripotamon vietnamicum =

Conservation status
- Data Deficient (IUCN 3.1)

Scientific classification
- Kingdom: Animalia
- Phylum: Arthropoda
- Class: Malacostraca
- Order: Decapoda
- Suborder: Pleocyemata
- Infraorder: Brachyura
- Family: Potamidae
- Genus: Tiwaripotamon
- Species: T. vietnamicum

Binomial name
- Tiwaripotamon vietnamicum (Đăng & Hồ, 2002)

Synonyms
- Geothelphusa vietnamica Đăng & Hồ, 2002; Hainanpotamon vietnamicum (Đăng & Hồ, 2002)

Species of crab

Tiwaripotamon vietnamicum is a species of crab. Originally described as a species of Geothelphusa, it is now treated as part of the genus Tiwaripotamon, although it has also been suggested as a member of Hainanpotamon. It is only known from a single locality in Cúc Phương National Park, Ninh Bình Province, Vietnam.
