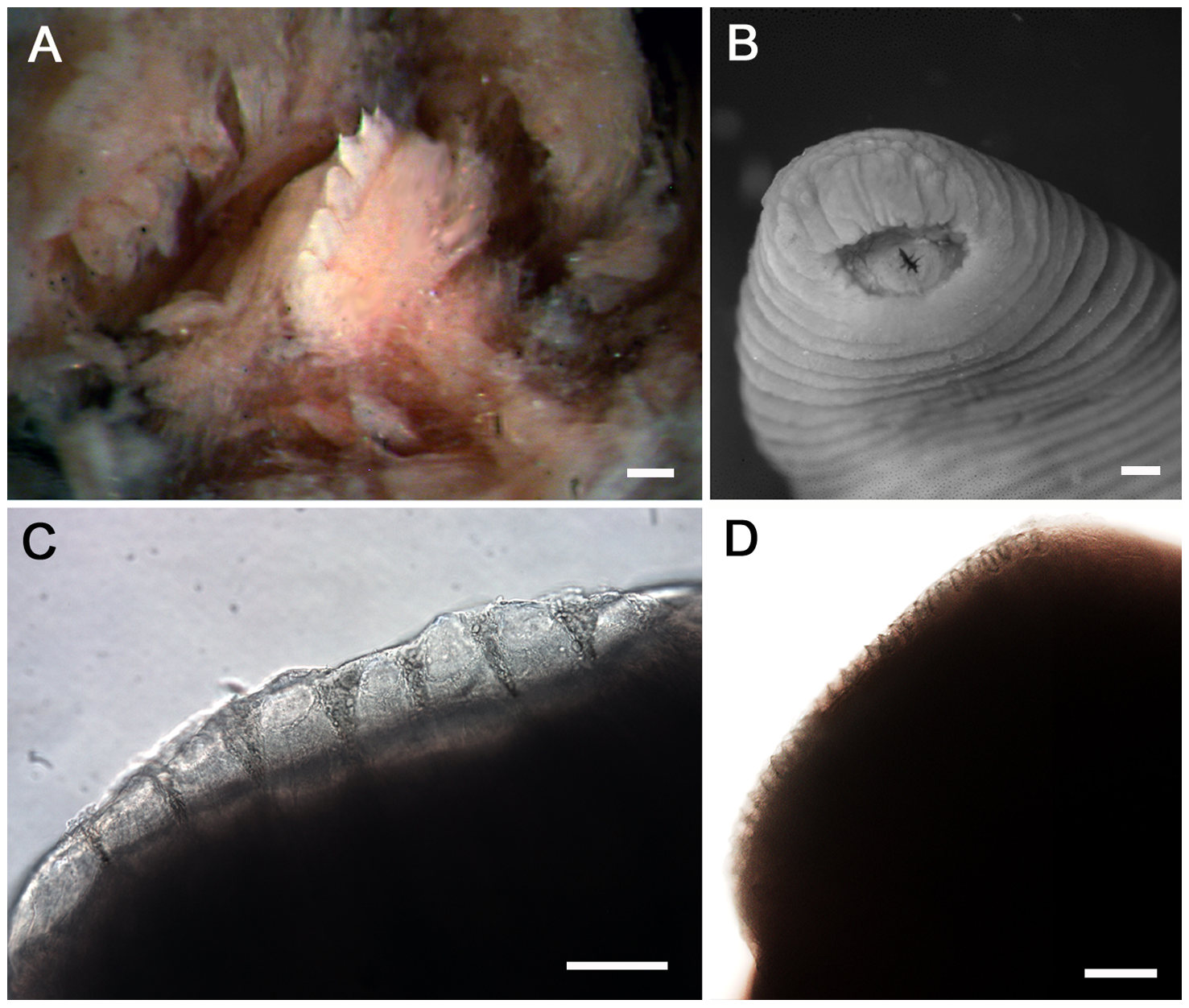
- (A) Stereomicrograph of the single dorsal jaw of "T. rex" with large teeth. Scale bar is 100 µm. (B) "Tyrannobdella rex" anterior sucker exhibiting velar mouth and longitudinal slit through which the dorsal jaw protrudes when feeding. Scale bar is 1 mm. (C) Compound micrograph in lateral view of eight large teeth of "T. rex". Scale bar is 100 µm. (D) Lateral view of jaw of "Limnatis paluda" illustrating typical size of hirudinoid teeth. Scale bar is 100 µm.

Scientific classification
- Kingdom: Animalia
- Phylum: Annelida
- Clade: Pleistoannelida
- Clade: Sedentaria
- Class: Clitellata
- Subclass: Hirudinea
- Order: Arhynchobdellida
- Suborder: Hirudiniformes
- Family: Praobdellidae; Sawyer, 1986

Genera
- See text

= Praobdellidae =

Family of hematophagous leeches which live on the mucous membranes of mammals

Praobdellidae is a family of hematophagous leeches which live on the mucous membranes of mammals and sometimes invertebrates. These are internal parasites that enter the body through natural orifices (usually nasal cavities and pharynx, more rarely the lower respiratory tract, anus, urethra, and vagina), and cause hirudiniasis.

These species are characterized by a reduced number of teeth, and a posterior sucker larger than the previous one. The latter may be involved in fixation on moist surfaces such as mucous membranes.

A 2017 paper discovered they did not exclusively infest mammals; individuals were recorded feeding on a Japanese freshwater crab, Geothelphusa dehaani.

== Genera ==
The Interim Register of Marine and Non-marine Genera include:

- Dinobdella Moore, 1927
- Limnatis Moquin-Tandon, 1827 (W)
- Limnobdella Blanchard, 1893
- Myxobdella Oka, 1917
- Parapraobdella Phillips, Oosthuizen & Siddall, 2011
- Praobdella Blanchard, 1896 (W)
- Tyrannobdella Phillips, Arauco-Brown, Oceguera-Figueroa, Gomez, Beltrán, Lai & Siddall, 2010 (W)
- NB:WoRMS only includes those marked (W) above.

== Bibliography ==
- Phillips, Anna J.; Arauco-Brown, Renzo; Oceguera-Figueroa, Alejandro; Gomez, Gloria P.; Beltrán, María; Lai, Yi-Te; Siddall, Mark E.; DeSalle, Robert (14 April 2010). "Tyrannobdella rex N. Gen. N. Sp. and the Evolutionary Origins of Mucosal Leech Infestations". PLOS ONE. 5 (4) e10057. Bibcode:2010PLoSO...510057P. doi:10.1371/journal.pone.0010057. PMC 2854684. PMID 20418947.
