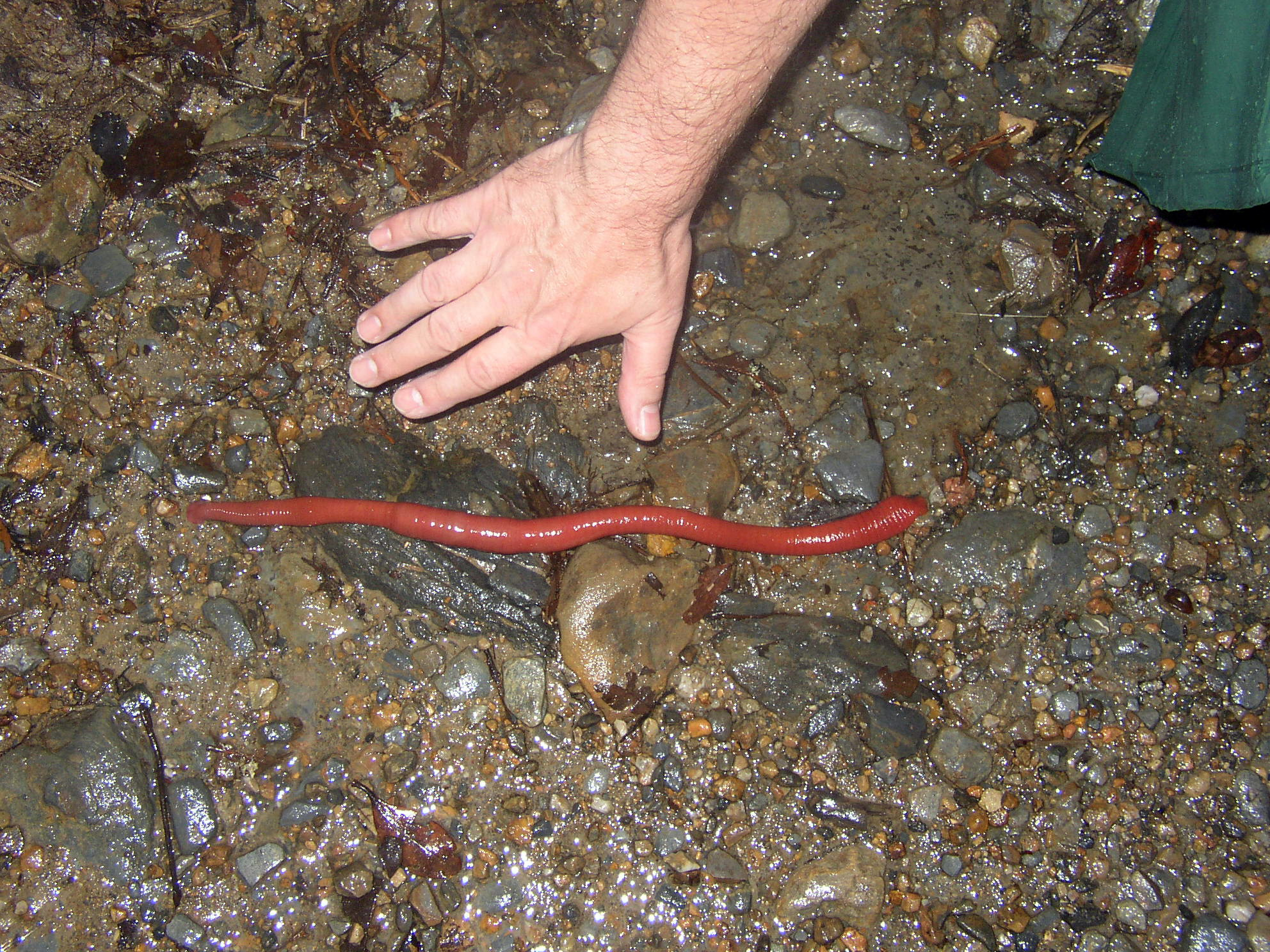
- Kinabalu giant red leech (Mimobdella buettikoferi)

Scientific classification
- Kingdom: Animalia
- Phylum: Annelida
- Clade: Pleistoannelida
- Clade: Sedentaria
- Class: Clitellata
- Subclass: Hirudinea
- Order: Arhynchobdellida
- Suborder: Erpobdelliformes; Sawyer, 1986

Families
- See text

= Erpobdelliformes =

Suborder of annelid worms

The Erpobdelliformes are one of the currently-accepted suborders of the proboscisless leeches (Arhynchobdellida). It includes five families:

- Americobdellidae
- Erpobdellidae Blanchard, 1894
- Gastrostomobdellidae Richardson, 1971
- Orobdellidae Nakano, Ramlah & Hikida, 2012
- Salifidae Johansson, 1910
