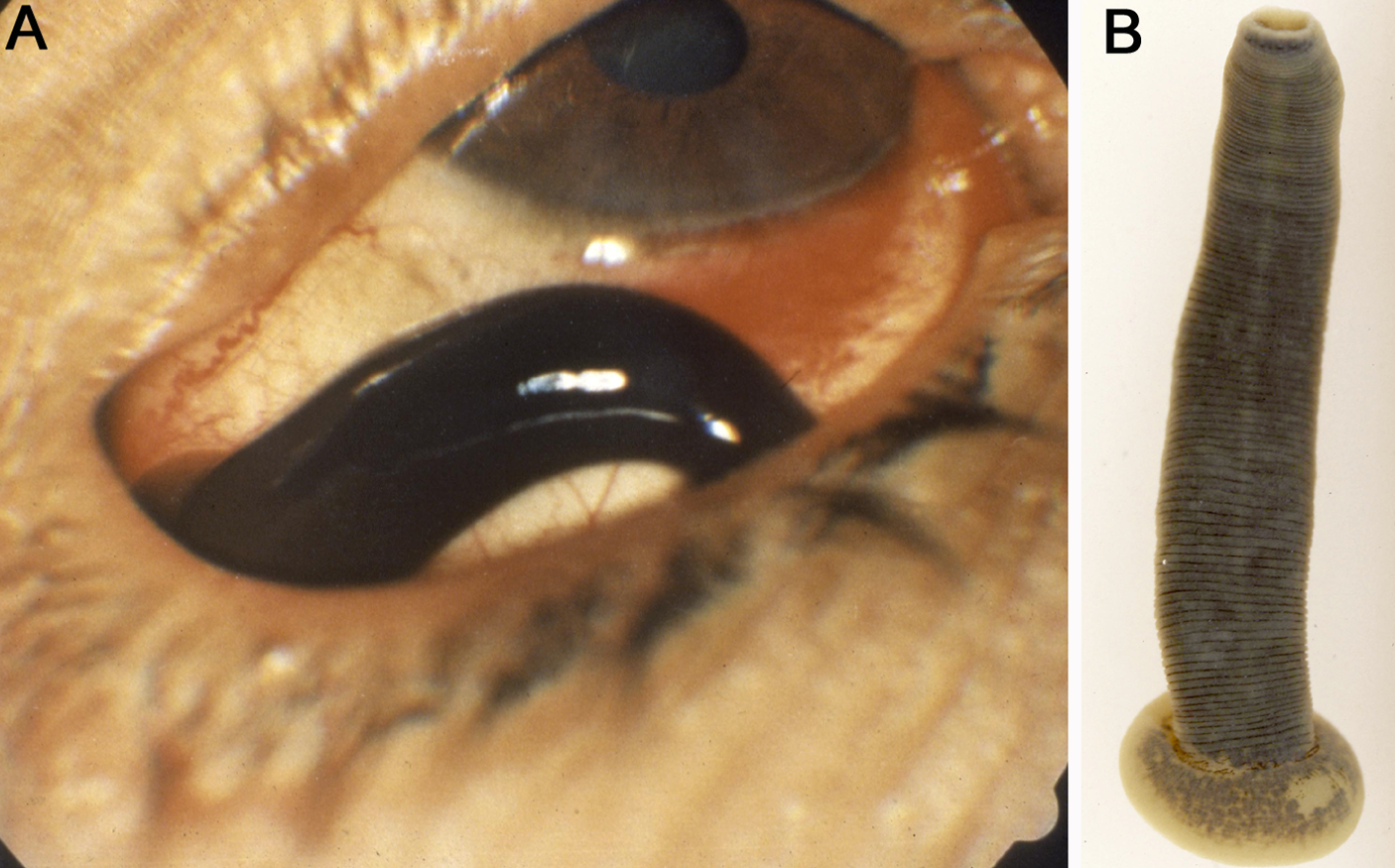
- (A) D. ferox infesting the eye of a dog; (B) anatomical view of D. ferox

Scientific classification
- Kingdom: Animalia
- Phylum: Annelida
- Clade: Pleistoannelida
- Clade: Sedentaria
- Class: Clitellata
- Subclass: Hirudinea
- Order: Arhynchobdellida
- Family: Praobdellidae
- Genus: Dinobdella; Moore, 1927
- Species: D. ferox

Binomial name
- Dinobdella ferox (Blanchard, 1896)

Synonyms
- Whitmania ferox Blanchard, 1896

= Dinobdella ferox =

Leech species

Dinobdella ferox is a species of leech in the family Praobdellidae. The species is found widely in Southeast Asia and mainly feeds on the mucosal membranes of the mammalian upper respiratory tract. It has been documented to feed on humans.

== Characteristic ==
D. ferox are dorsoventrally flattened with tappers at each end. Both ends contain a sucker that they use to attach to the host. The posterior end is used for locomotion and the main attachment to a host. The anterior end is where the mouth, jaws, and teeth are located. The jaws of this leech are made up of three sections that meet in a Y. D. ferox has a dark red to brown coloring consistent throughout its segmented body. This species only reaches around 70mm in length when fully engorged at adult size. Juveniles enter a host at less than a centimeter and are very difficult to detect.

== Life and diet ==
Aquatic leeches such as D. ferox have weaker jaws than those of terrestrial leeches. This leads to them most often attaching themselves to the thin surfaces of the mucosal membranes. Aquatic leeches have been found on sites such as the nose, mouth, pharynx, larynx, conjunctiva, trachea, bronchi, esophagus, vagina, bladder, rectum, and the creases of the eyes, Although most instances were found in the nasopharynx, lower airways, or upper esophagus. Humans become victims from bathing or drinking unfiltered water in less-developed areas where safe water is less accessible. Several species of leech are known to feed on humans including Tyrannobdella rex, Hirudinea granulosa, and Hirundinea viridis. Human infections have been shown to not exceed more than only one leech infecting an individual. Cattle and other large animals can have more than 8 found during an examination.

== Distribution and habitat ==
Dinobdella ferox is found throughout Southeast Asia, but is very common in many parts of Taiwan. These leeches are aquatic and live in stagnant low oxygen water sources. This can be in ponds or lakes where humans, cattle, or wild animals drink or bathe. Poverty and drought are examples of how humans and domesticated animals can become hosts more often. Limited water sources and sharing them with wildlife can introduce leeches into the water.

== Treatment ==
Hirudiniasis is a condition characterized by an infestation of leeches. Leeches can cause airway obstruction, severe respiratory distress, hemoptysis, or hematemesis. Blood loss leading to acute anemia can be deadly in children or small animals. Disease transmission has not been recorded in this species. Treatment for a leech infestation starts with attempting to remove the parasites manually with artery forceps. The forceps are used to grip the leech’s mucus-covered body tightly and attempt the move it laterally to minimize injury, but if the membranes are heavily damaged or the leech is too strongly attached a sodium chloride solution can be used to irrigate the nose in order to weaken or break the leech’s hold. This is because the saline disrupts the mucous layer of the leech. This is considered the best treatment if possible. It is considered to be much less painful for the victim and causes far less bleeding in the aftermath. The anemia is usually treated with iron and vitamin supplements.
