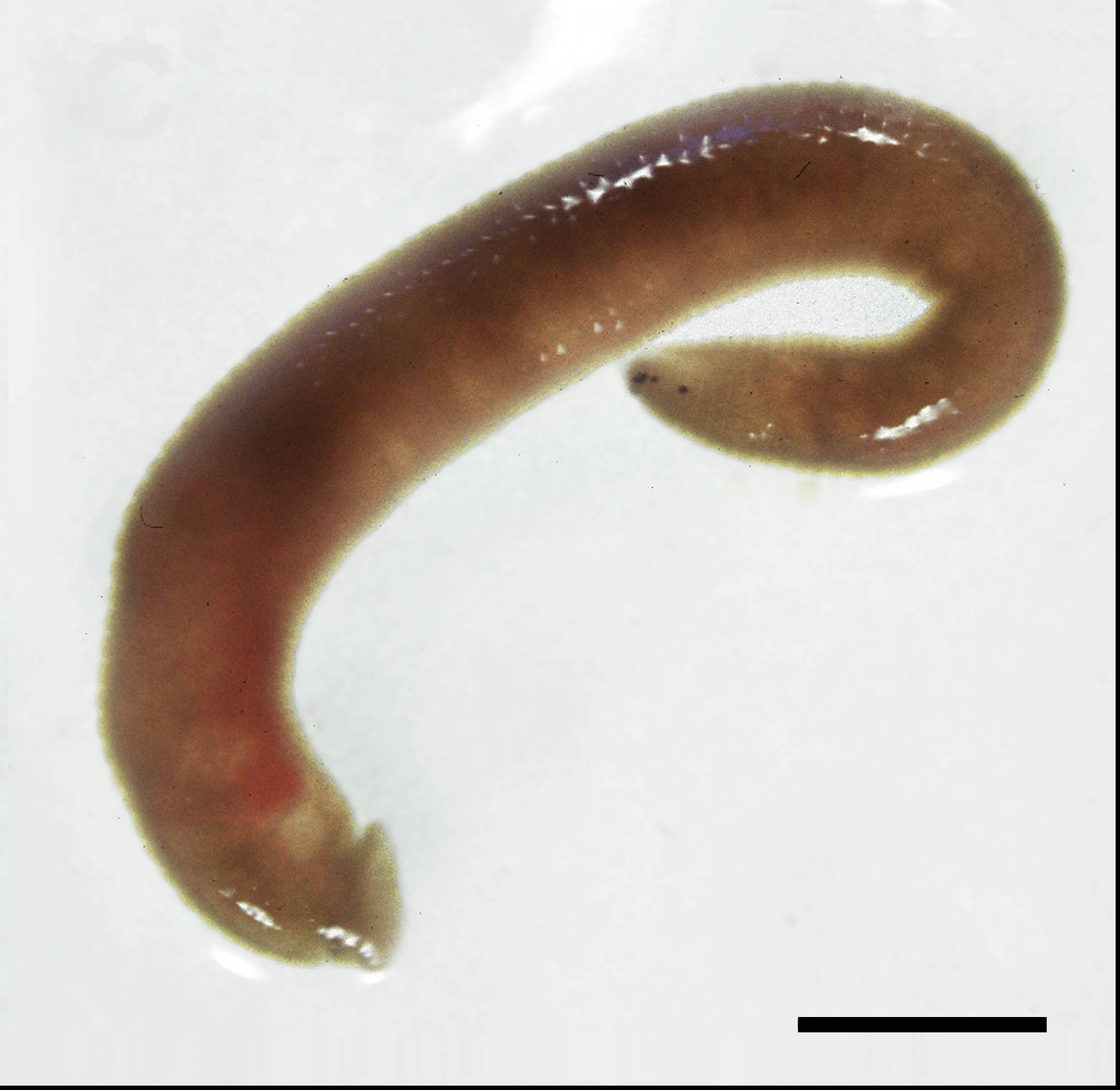

Scientific classification
- Kingdom: Animalia
- Phylum: Annelida
- Clade: Pleistoannelida
- Clade: Sedentaria
- Class: Clitellata
- Subclass: Hirudinea
- Order: Arhynchobdellida
- Suborder: Hirudiniformes
- Family: Xerobdellidae; Moore, 1946

Synonyms
- Diestecostomatidae; Mesobdellidae

= Xerobdellidae =

Family of annelids

Xerobdellidae are a small family of jawed leeches in the order Arhynchobdellida. Xerobdellidae have three jaws and five pairs of eyes, the fourth and fifth being separated by one or two eyeless segments. The genera placed herein occur in Chile (Mesobdella), Europe (Xerobdella) and Diestecostoma is found in Central and northern South America. This peculiar distribution strongly suggests they are a relict Pangaean group, which had already been present by the start of the Jurassic 250 million years ago.

== Description ==
These leeches resemble the Haemadipsidae and were included there by many authors, but this has always been controversial. Their status as a distinct family is supported by sequence analysis of the nuclear 18S and 28S rDNA and mitochondrial COI genes as well as the anatomy of their sexual organs and nephridia; the latter are located at the belly rather than along the body sides as in the Haemadipsidae proper.

They feed on blood – typically of amphibians – and small invertebrate except Mesobdella, which is exclusively a blood-feeder and has been recorded to attack humans on occasion.

== Genera ==
The Interim Register of Marine and Non-marine Genera lists:

1. Diestecostoma Vaillant in Quatrefages (Vaillant), 1890
2. Mesobdella Blanchard, 1893
3. Nesophilaemon Nybelin, 1943
4. Xerobdella Frauenfeld, 1868
