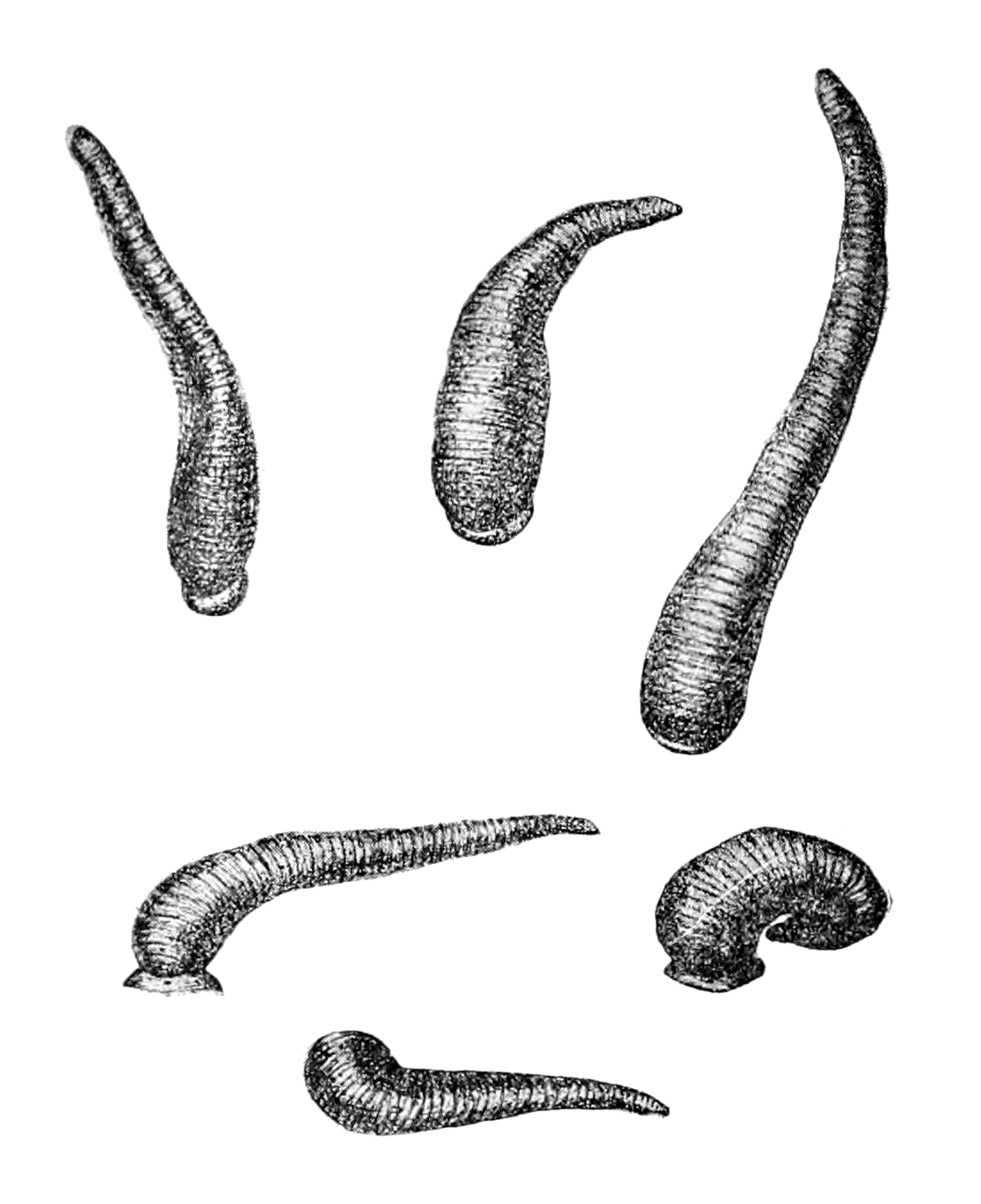
- Limnatis nilotica

Scientific classification
- Kingdom: Animalia
- Phylum: Annelida
- Clade: Pleistoannelida
- Clade: Sedentaria
- Class: Clitellata
- Subclass: Hirudinea
- Order: Arhynchobdellida
- Family: Hirudinidae
- Genus: Limnatis; Moquin-Tandon, 1827

Synonyms
- Limnotis Gérard, 1845; Bdella Savigny, 1822

= Limnatis (annelid) =

Genus of annelid worms

Limnatis is a genus of freshwater leeches, recorded from Europe, Africa and western Asia. Authorities disagree whether this genus should be placed in the family Hirudinidae or Praobdellidae.

== Species ==
Limnatis includes the following species:

- Limnatis haasi Johansson, 1927
- Limnatis nilotica (Savigny, 1822)
- Limnatis paluda (Tennent, 1859)
