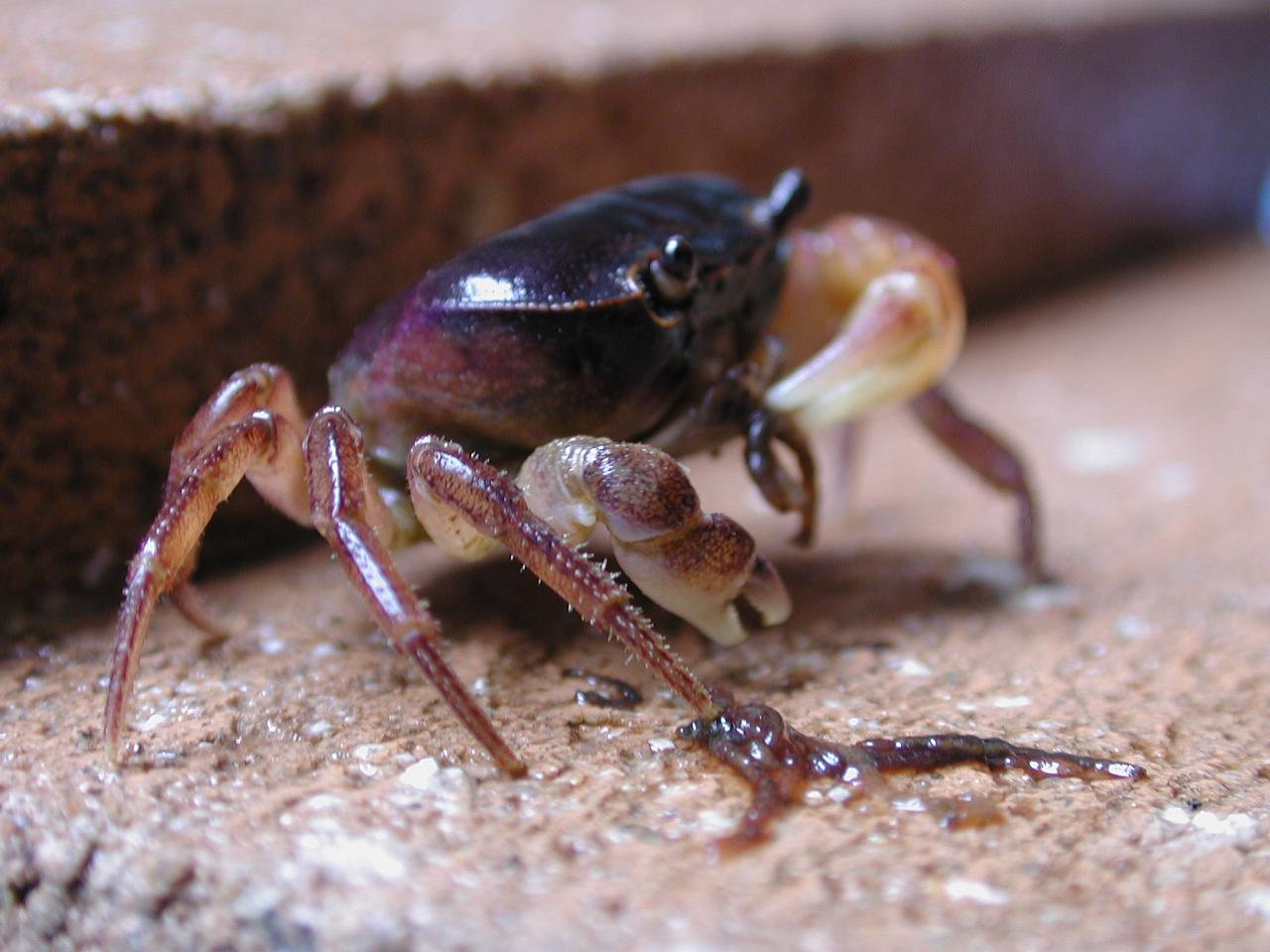
- Geothelphusa dehaani

Scientific classification
- Kingdom: Animalia
- Phylum: Arthropoda
- Clade: Pancrustacea
- Class: Malacostraca
- Order: Decapoda
- Suborder: Pleocyemata
- Infraorder: Brachyura
- Family: Potamidae
- Subfamily: Potamiscinae
- Genus: Geothelphusa; Stimpson, 1858

Synonyms
- Parathelphusa (Geothelphusa) Stimpson, 1858; Potamon (Geothelphusa) Stimpson, 1858

= Geothelphusa =

Genus of crabs

Geothelphusa is a genus of Asian freshwater crabs, erected by W. Stimpson in 1858.

== Species ==
A study on Geothelphusa species from northern Taiwan and the Yaeyama Islands suggests that their speciation was likely driven by climatic changes during the Pleistocene, with two main clades diverging around 5.3 million years ago (Shih et al., 2011).

The World Register of Marine Species includes:

- Geothelphusa albogilva Shy, Ng & Yu, 1994
- Geothelphusa amagui Naruse & Shokita, 2009
- Geothelphusa ancylophallus Shy, Ng & Yu, 1994
- Geothelphusa aramotoi Minei, 1973
- Geothelphusa bicolor Shy, Ng & Yu, 1994
- Geothelphusa boreas Shy, Shih & Mao, 2021
- Geothelphusa caesia Shy, Ng & Yu, 1994
- Geothelphusa candidiensis Bott, 1967
- Geothelphusa chiui Minei, 1974
- Geothelphusa cilan Shy, Shih & Mao, 2014
- Geothelphusa cinerea Shy, Ng & Yu, 1994
- Geothelphusa dehaani (White, 1847)
- Geothelphusa dolichopodes Shy, Ng & Yu, 1994
- Geothelphusa eucrinodonta Shy, Ng & Yu, 1994
- Geothelphusa eurysoma Shy, Ng & Yu, 1994
- Geothelphusa exigua Suzuki & Tsuda, 1994
- Geothelphusa ferruginea Shy, Ng & Yu, 1994
- Geothelphusa fulva Naruse, Shokita & Shy, 2004
- Geothelphusa gracilipes Shy, Ng & Yu, 1994
- Geothelphusa grandiovata Naruse, Shokita & Ng, 2006
- Geothelphusa haituan Chen, Hsu & Cheng, 2007
- Geothelphusa hirsuta Tan & Liu, 1998
- Geothelphusa holthuisi Shih, Shy & Lee, 2010
- Geothelphusa iheya Naruse, Shokita & Ng, 2006
- Geothelphusa ilan Shy, Ng & Yu, 1994
- Geothelphusa koshikiensis Suzuki & Kawai, 2011
- Geothelphusa kumejima Naruse, Shokita & Ng, 2006
- Geothelphusa leeae Shy, 2005
- Geothelphusa levicervix (Rathbun, 1898)
- Geothelphusa lili Chen, Cheng & Shy, 2005
- Geothelphusa makatao Shih & Shy, 2009
- Geothelphusa marginata Naruse, Shokita & Shy, 2004
- Geothelphusa marmorata Suzuki & Okano, 2000
- Geothelphusa minei Shy & Ng, 1998
- Geothelphusa mishima Suzuki & Kawai, 2011
- Geothelphusa miyakoensis Shokita, Naruse & Fuji, 2002
- Geothelphusa miyazakii (Miyake & Chiu, 1965)
- Geothelphusa monticola Shy, Ng & Yu, 1994
- Geothelphusa nanao Shy, Ng & Yu, 1994
- Geothelphusa nanhsi Shy, Ng & Yu, 1994
- Geothelphusa obtusipes Stimpson, 1858
- Geothelphusa olea Shy, Ng & Yu, 1994
- Geothelphusa pingtung Tan & Liu, 1998
- Geothelphusa sakamotoana (Rathbun, 1905)
- Geothelphusa shernshan Chen, Cheng & Shy, 2005
- Geothelphusa shokitai Shy & Ng, 1998
- Geothelphusa siasiat Shih, Naruse & Yeo, 2008
- Geothelphusa takuan Shy, Ng & Yu, 1994
- Geothelphusa tali Shy, Ng & Yu, 1994
- Geothelphusa taroko Shy, Ng & Yu, 1994
- Geothelphusa tawu Shy, Ng & Yu, 1994
- Geothelphusa tenuimanus (Miyake & Minei, 1965)
- Geothelphusa tsayae Shy, Ng & Yu, 1994
- Geothelphusa wangi Shy, Ng & Yu, 1994
- Geothelphusa wutai Shy, Ng & Yu, 1994
- Geothelphusa yangmingshan Shy, Ng & Yu, 1994

Synonyms

- Geothelphusa kuhlii, synonym of Terrathelphusa kuhlii
- Geothelphusa lanyu, synonym of Geothelphusa tawu
- Geothelphusa leichardti, synonym of Austrothelphusa transversa
- Geothelphusa lutao, synonym of Geothelphusa tawu
- Geothelphusa modesta, synonym of Terrathelphusa chilensis
- Geothelphusa neipu, synonym of Geothelphusa pingtung
- Geothelphusa vietnamica, synonym of Tiwaripotamon vietnamicum
