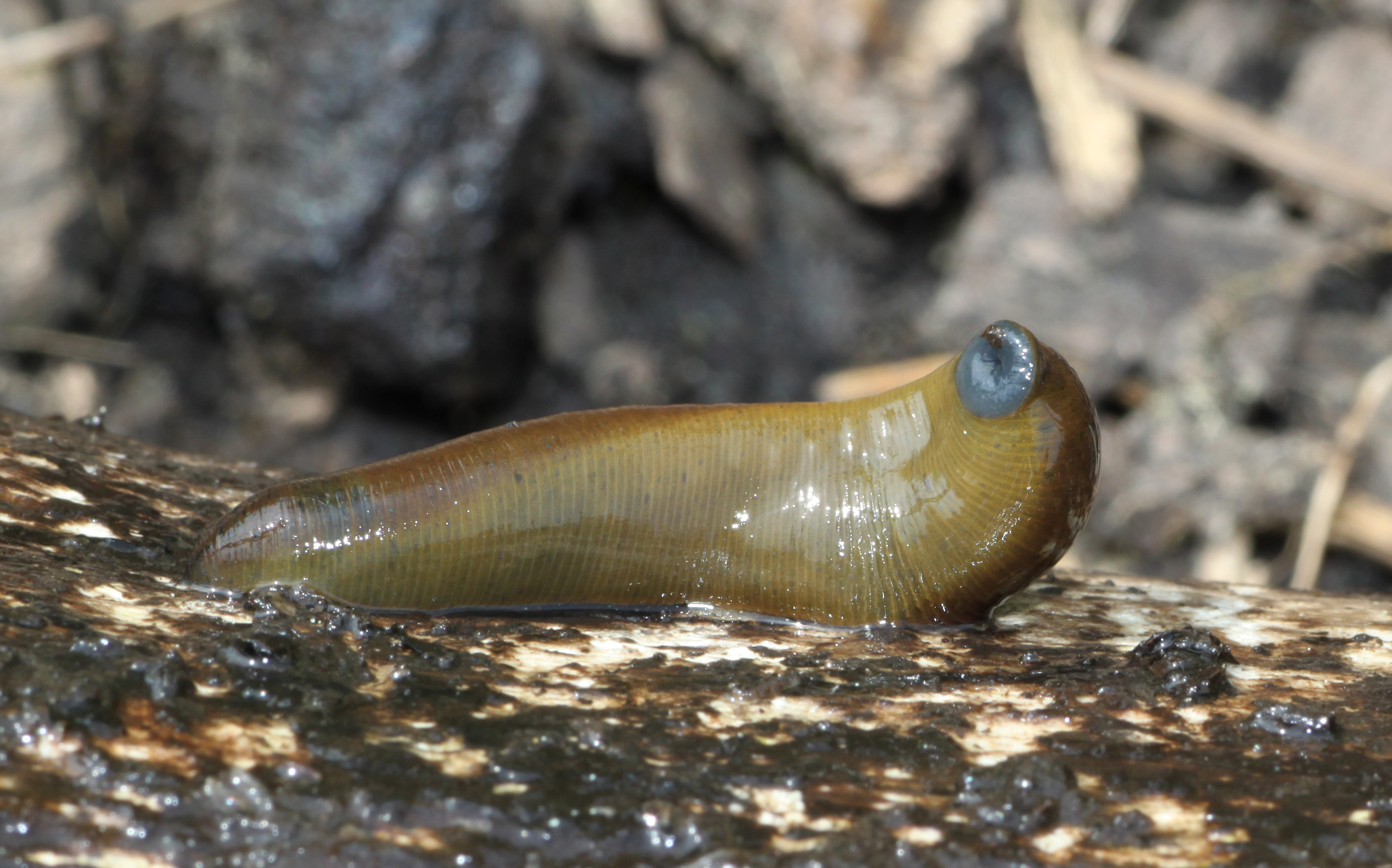
- Haemopis sanguisuga

Scientific classification
- Kingdom: Animalia
- Phylum: Annelida
- Clade: Pleistoannelida
- Clade: Sedentaria
- Class: Clitellata
- Subclass: Hirudinea
- Order: Arhynchobdellida
- Family: Haemopidae
- Genus: Haemopis; Savigny, 1822

Synonyms
- Aulastoma Moquin-Tandon, 1826

= Haemopis =

Genus of leeches

Haemopis is a genus of leeches belonging to the family Haemopidae. The species of this genus are found in Eurasia and Northern America.

== Species ==
Species include:

- Haemopis caballeroi (Richardson, 1971)
- Haemopis caeca Manoleli, Klemm & Sarbu, 1998
- Haemopis elegans (Moquin-Tandon, 1846)
- Haemopis grandis (Verrill, 1874)
- Haemopis kingi Mathers, 1954
- Haemopis lateromaculata Mathers, 1963
- Haemopis marmorata (Say, 1824)
- Haemopis ottorum Wirchansky & Shain, 2010
- Haemopis paludum Tennent, 1859
- Haemopis plumbea Moore, 1912
- Haemopis sanguisuga (Linnaeus, 1758)
- Haemopis septagon Sawyer & Shelley, 1976
- Haemopis terrestris (Forbes, 1890)
