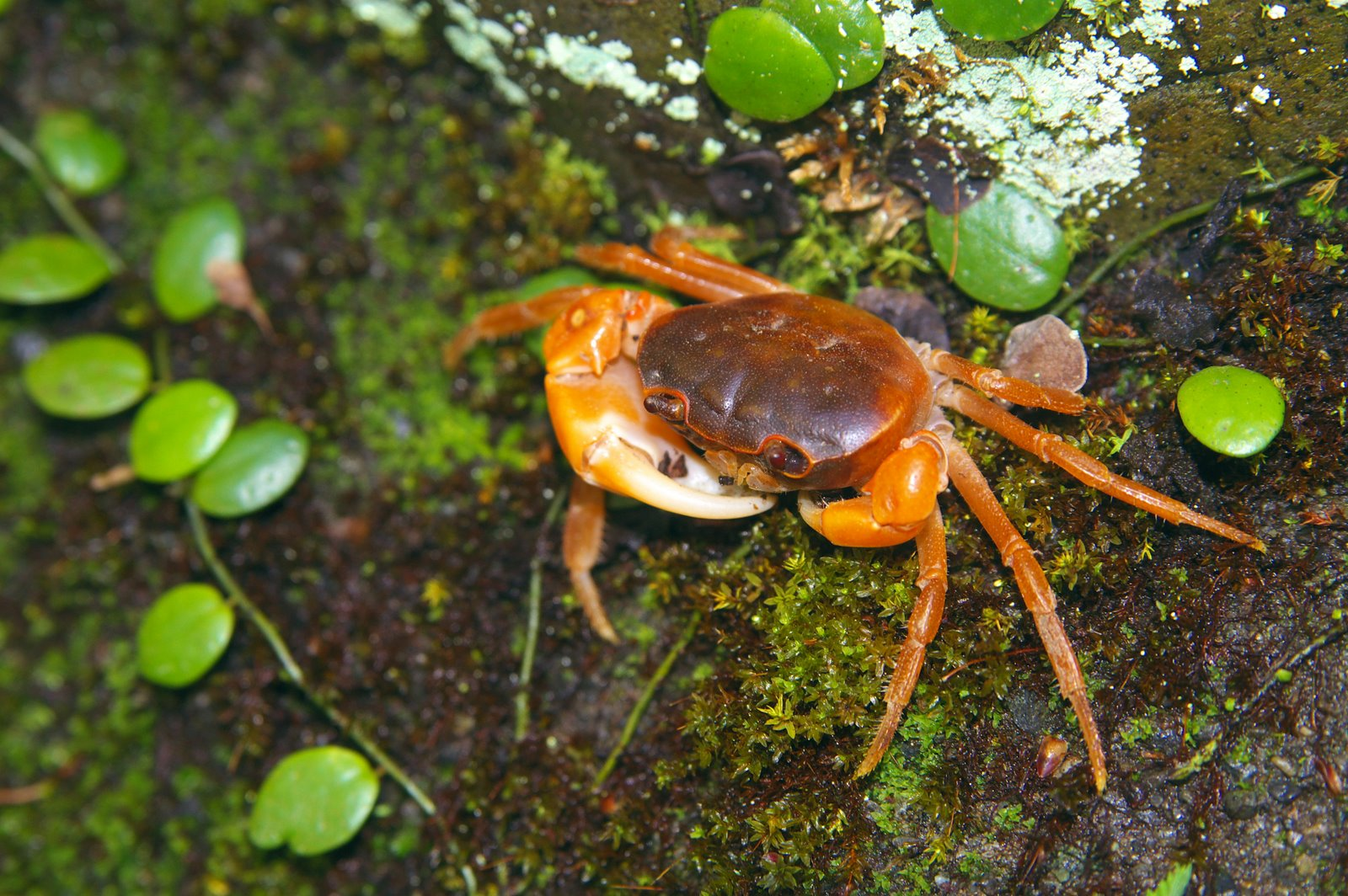

Conservation status
- Least Concern (IUCN 3.1)

Scientific classification
- Kingdom: Animalia
- Phylum: Arthropoda
- Clade: Pancrustacea
- Class: Malacostraca
- Order: Decapoda
- Suborder: Pleocyemata
- Infraorder: Brachyura
- Family: Potamidae
- Genus: Geothelphusa
- Species: G. dehaani

Binomial name
- Geothelphusa dehaani (White, 1847)

Synonyms
- Thelphusa japonica De Haan, 1861; Thelphusa dehaani White, 1847

= Geothelphusa dehaani =

Species of crab

A Japanese freshwater crab in Hakone, Japan

Geothelphusa dehaani, commonly known as Japanese freshwater crab or sawagani (Japanese: サワガニ), is a species of freshwater crab in the family Potamidae, endemic to Japan. It inhabits clear mountain streams and is known for its small size, nocturnal behavior, and role as an indicator of healthy freshwater ecosystems. The species is also a culinary delicacy in Japanese cuisine.

== Taxonomy ==
Geothelphusa dehaani was first described by Adam White in 1847. It belongs to the genus Geothelphusa in the family Potamidae, which includes freshwater crabs. It is one of two freshwater crab species native to Japan, alongside the mitten crab (Eriocheir japonica). Historically, it was known as Thelphusa dehaani and Thelphusa japonica.

== Description ==
Geothelphusa dehaani is a small crab with a carapace width of 20 to 30 mm (0.8 to 1.2 inches). Its body color varies by region, including purple-black, red-brown, and gray-blue, with chelipeds (claws) often dark-yellow or milky white. The carapace is smooth, and color variations include a notable blue variant.

== Distribution and habitat ==
Geothelphusa dehaani is endemic to Japan, distributed from Aomori Prefecture in northern Honshu to Kagoshima Prefecture in southern Kyushu, including the Ryukyu Islands and islands like Sado, Oki, Tanegashima, and Yaku. It inhabits clear, unpolluted mountain streams, valleys, and swamps, often under rocks and fallen trees in water. Its reliance on clean water makes it an indicator species for healthy freshwater ecosystems.

== Biology and ecology ==
Geothelphusa dehaani is primarily nocturnal but may be active during the day on rainy or cloudy days. It is active from March to November, hibernating under rocks in water during winter. As an omnivore, it feeds on small insects, snails, earthworms, plants, and fallen leaves, contributing to nutrient cycling in its ecosystem. On humid days, it may venture into forests and climb trees in parks.

== Parasites and public health ==
Geothelphusa dehaani serves as an intermediate host for lung flukes such as Paragonimus westermani, Paragonimus wmiyazakii, and P. skrjabini miyazakii. Human consumption of raw or undercooked infected crabs can lead to paragonimiasis, presenting symptoms like pleural effusion and pneumothorax. In humans, paragonimiasis from infected crabs presents with pulmonary symptoms such as chronic cough, hemoptysis, chest pain, and fever. Flukes may also migrate ectopically to the brain, causing seizures and neurological deficits. The infection is treatable with praziquantel or triclabendazole.

Leeches from the family Praobdellidae have also been found feeding on this species, which is rare for crustacean hosts.

== Life cycle ==
Reproduction occurs in summer, with females laying approximately 50 eggs, which they carry on their abdomen until hatching. The species exhibits direct development, with eggs hatching into juvenile crabs without a planktonic larval stage. The lifespan is estimated at 10 years.

== Cultural significance ==
In Japan, Geothelphusa dehaani is a culinary delicacy, often fried or boiled in soy sauce. It is served as a snack in izakayas or occasionally in sushi, with a crispy texture when properly fried, though improper cooking can result in a fishy smell.
