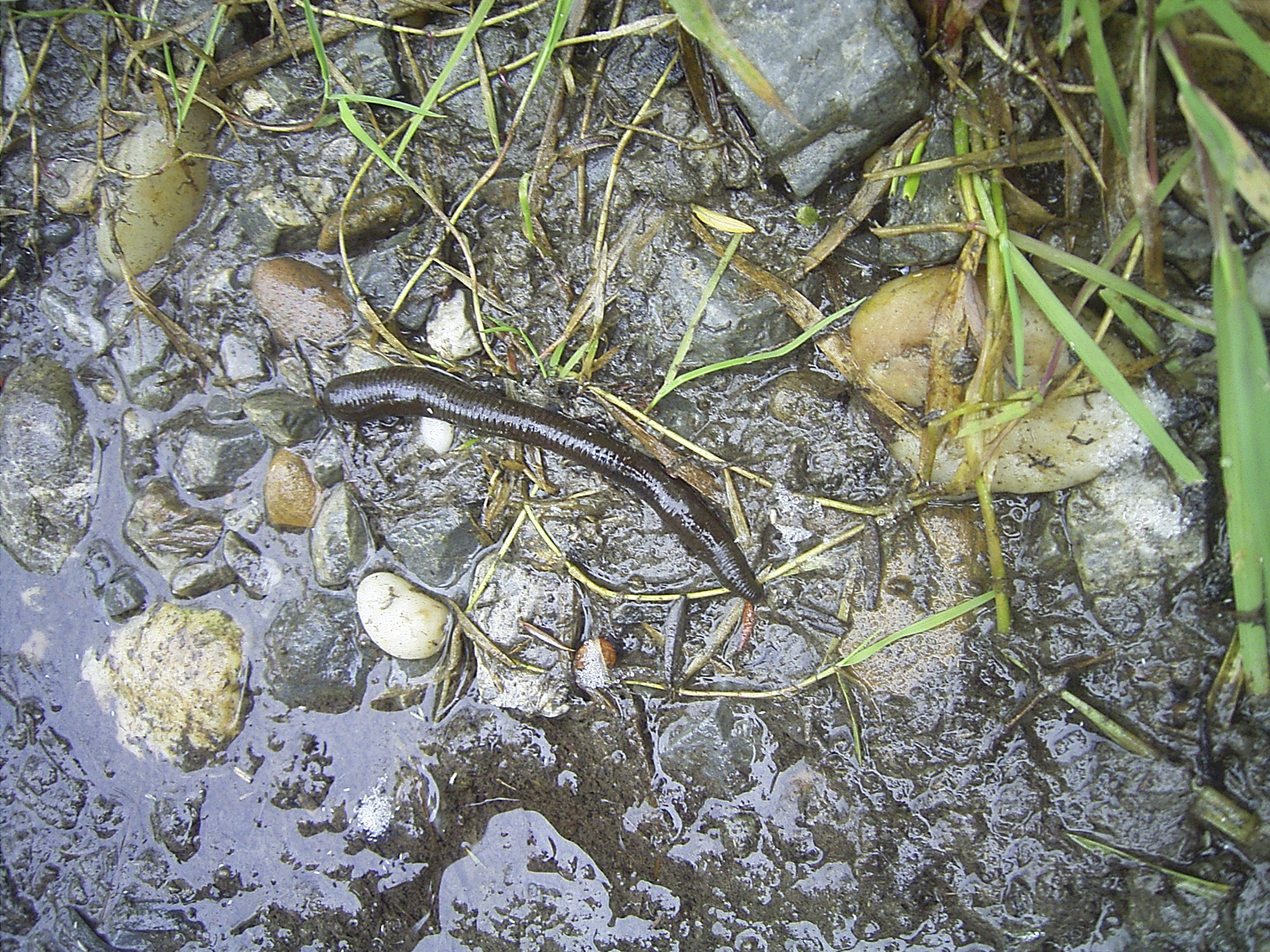
- Haemopis species (Haemopidae) in Danube-Auen National Park

Scientific classification
- Kingdom: Animalia
- Phylum: Annelida
- Clade: Pleistoannelida
- Clade: Sedentaria
- Class: Clitellata
- Subclass: Hirudinea
- Order: Arhynchobdellida
- Suborder: Hirudiniformes

Families
- Cylicobdellidae; Haemadipsidae; Haemopidae; Hirudinidae; Macrobdellidae; Praobdellidae; Semiscolecidae; Xerobdellidae

Synonyms
- Gnathobdellae; Gnathobdellida Vaillant, 1890 (but see text)

= Hirudiniformes =

Suborder of annelid worms

The Hirudiniformes are one of the currently-accepted suborders of the proboscisless leeches (Arhynchobdellida). Their best-known member is the European medical leech, Hirudo medicinalis, and indeed most of the blood-sucking "worms" as which leeches are generally perceived belong to this group. In general, though some leeches suck blood, many are predators which hunt small invertebrates.

The Arhynchobdellida were formerly divided into two groups, denoted by presence or absence of toothed jaws. But this does not represent a natural division, as has now been determined - the most primitive proboscisless leeches are not found among the jawed blood-sucking forms as was generally believed, but among the jawless predators.

== Taxonomy ==
Jawed leeches, termed "Gnathobdellae" or "Gnathobdellida", are exclusively found among the Hirudiniformes, but the order contains a number of jawless families as well. The jawed, toothed forms make up the aquatic Hirudidae and the terrestrial Haemadipsidae and Xerobdellidae (sometimes included in the preceding but worthy of recognition as an independent family). These might actually form a clade, but it seems that the Hirudidae might rather be close relatives of the carnivorous Haemopidae instead.

Many of the most well-known leeches belong to this family, most notably the medical leeches, such as the European species, already mentioned, which is prominent among these. Other medical Hirudiniformes of lesser importance are for example other species of the genus Hirudo, the North American medical leech (Macrobdella decora), and the Asian medical leech (Hirudinaria manillensis). Among the better-known bloodsucking land leeches are species belonging to the Asian genus Haemadipsa: they include the Indian leech (H. sylvestris) and the yamabiru or Japanese Mountain Leech (H. zeylanica).
