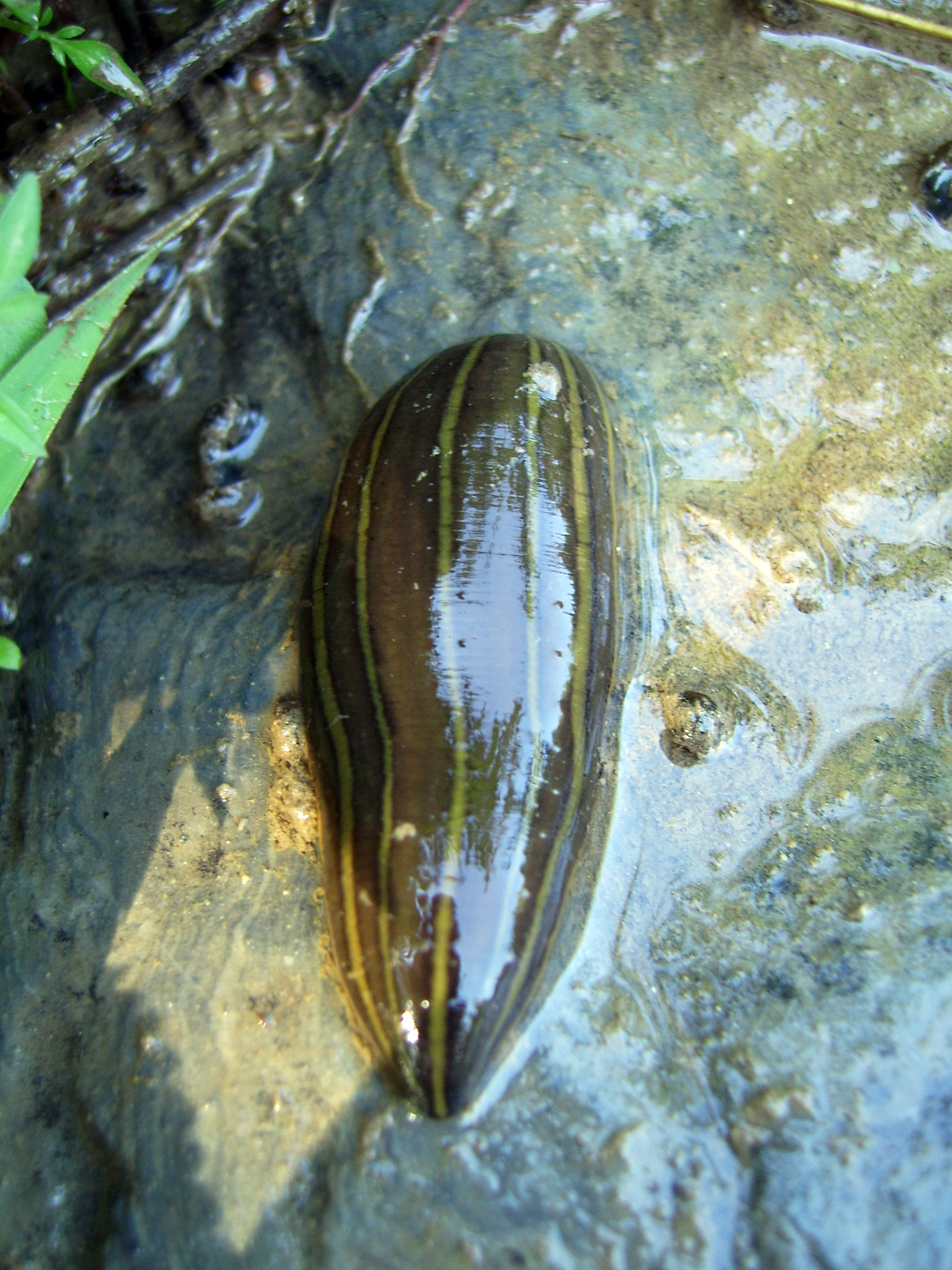

Scientific classification
- Kingdom: Animalia
- Phylum: Annelida
- Clade: Pleistoannelida
- Clade: Sedentaria
- Class: Clitellata
- Subclass: Hirudinea
- Order: Arhynchobdellida
- Suborder: Hirudiniformes
- Family: Hirudinidae; Whitman, 1886

= Hirudinidae =

Family of annelids

Hirudinidae is a family of leeches belonging to the order Arhynchobdellida.

== Genera ==
The Interim Register of Marine and Non-marine Genera lists:

1. Hirudo Linnaeus, 1758
2. Hirudobdella Goddard, 1910
3. Limnatis Moquin-Tandon, 1827
4. Limnobdella Blanchard, 1893
5. Ornithobdella Benham, 1909
6. Pintobdella Caballero, 1937
7. Poecilobdella Blanchard, 1893

Genera of uncertain placement

1. Asiaticobdella Richardson, 1969
2. Aulastoma Moquin-Tandon, 1827
3. Dinobdella Moore, 1927
4. Diplobdella Moore, 1902
5. Hexabdella Verrill, 1872
6. Myxobdella Oka, 1917
7. Oxyptychus Grube, 1850
8. Potamobdella Caballero
9. Richardsonianus Richardson
