= Semiscolecidae =

Scientific classification
- Kingdom: Animalia
- Phylum: Annelida
- Clade: Pleistoannelida
- Clade: Sedentaria
- Class: Clitellata
- Subclass: Hirudinea
- Order: Arhynchobdellida
- Family: Semiscolecidae

Family of annelids

Semiscolecidae is a family of annelids belonging to the order Arhynchobdellida.

Genera:

- Cyclobdella Weyenbergh, 1879
- Orchibdella Ringuelet, 1945
- Patagoniobdella Ringuelet, 1972
