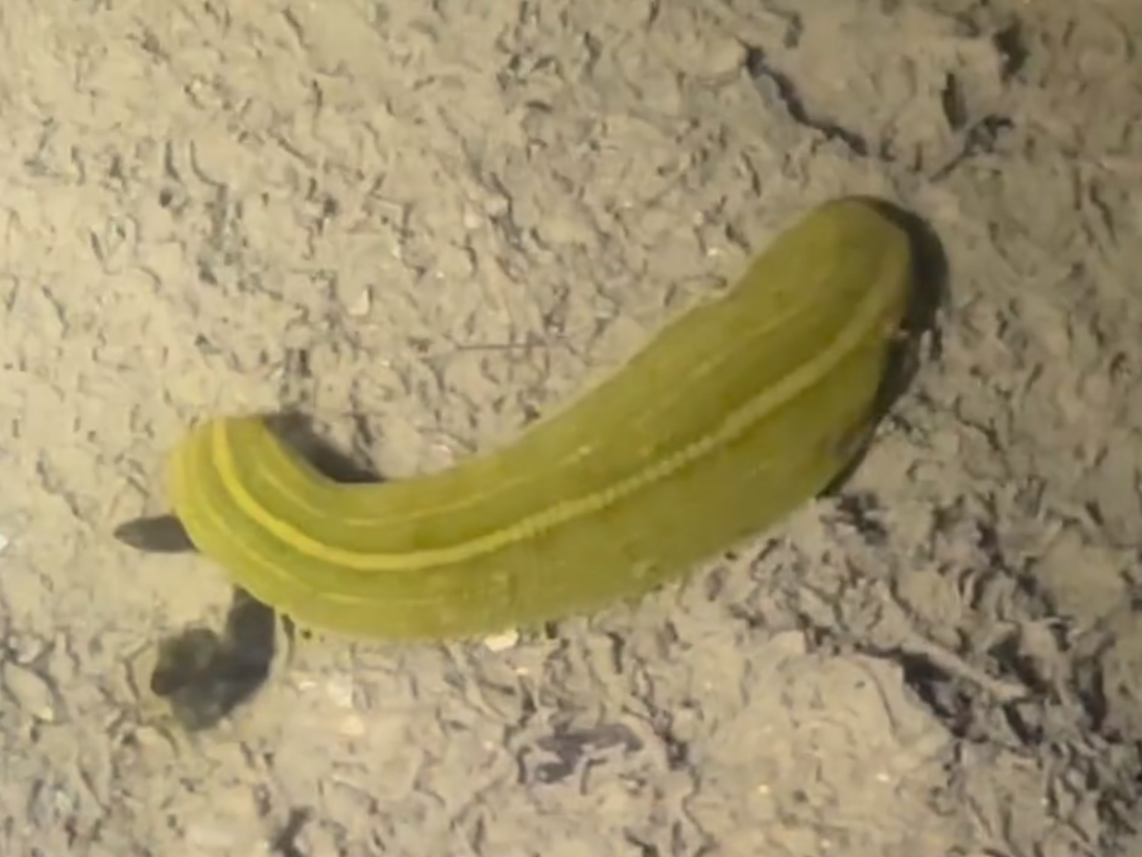
- Whitmania pigra

Scientific classification
- Kingdom: Animalia
- Phylum: Annelida
- Clade: Pleistoannelida
- Clade: Sedentaria
- Class: Clitellata
- Subclass: Hirudinea
- Order: Arhynchobdellida
- Suborder: Hirudiniformes
- Family: Haemopidae; Richardson, 1969

= Haemopidae =

Family of leeches

Haemopidae is a family of leeches belonging to the order Arhynchobdellida.

== Genera ==
The following may be included:

1. Haemopis Savigny, 1820
2. Whitmania Blanchard, 1887

Of other genera previously assigned to this family, Philobdella and Semiscolex have since been assigned elsewhere, while Bdellarogatis, Mollibdella and Percymoorensis, created by Richardson (1969) for North American species formerly in Haemopis, are not generally accepted by current workers.
