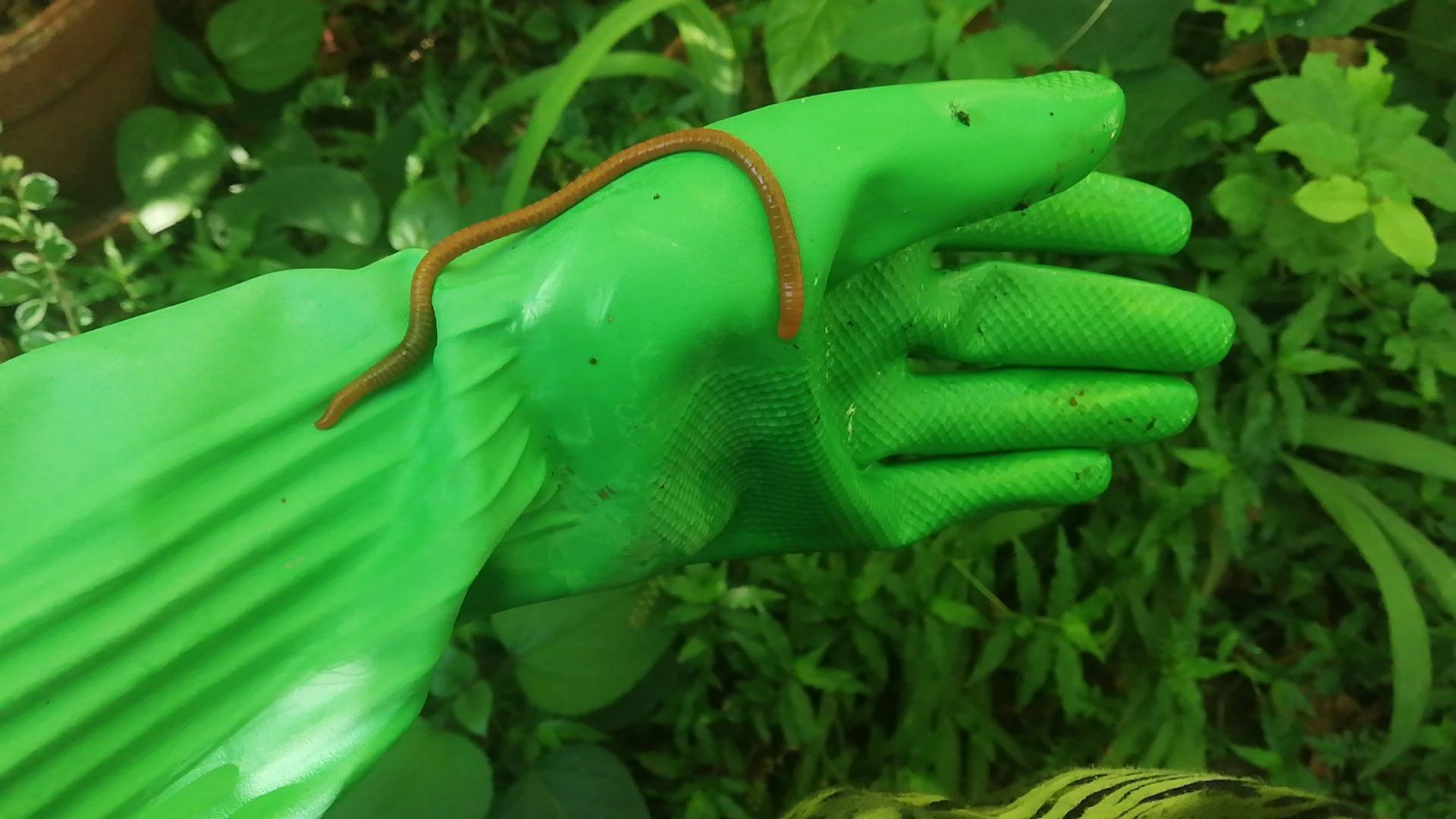
- Cyliobdella joseensis

Scientific classification
- Domain: Eukaryota
- Kingdom: Animalia
- Phylum: Annelida
- Clade: Pleistoannelida
- Clade: Sedentaria
- Class: Clitellata
- Subclass: Hirudinea
- Order: Arhynchobdellida
- Suborder: Hirudiniformes
- Family: Cylicobdellidae; Ringuelet, 1972

= Cylicobdellidae =

Family of leeches

Cylicobdellidae is a family of leeches belonging to the order Arhynchobdellida from the Americas.

== Genera ==
The following genera as currently (2025) accepted in this family:

1. Blanchardiella Weber, 1914
2. Centropygos Grube, 1859
3. Cylicobdella Grube, 1871
4. Liostoma Wagler, 1831
