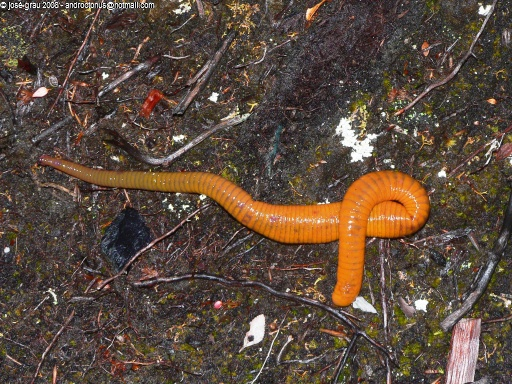
- A giant Americobdella species from southern Chile.

Scientific classification
- Kingdom: Animalia
- Phylum: Annelida
- Clade: Pleistoannelida
- Clade: Sedentaria
- Class: Clitellata
- Subclass: Hirudinea
- Infraclass: Euhirudinea
- Order: Arhynchobdellida; Blanchard, 1894

Suborders
- Erpobdelliformes; Hirudiniformes and see text

Synonyms
- Arhynchobdellae Stuart, 1982; Pharyngobdellae; Pharyngobdellida Johnson, 1913

= Arhynchobdellida =

Proboscisless leeches

Order of leeches

Arhynchobdellida, the proboscisless leeches, are a monophyletic order of leeches. They are defined by the lack of the protrusible proboscis that defines their sister taxon, the Rhynchobdellida. Arhynchobdellida is a diverse order, comprising both aquatic and terrestrial, besides sanguivorous and predatory, leeches. The order is divided into two suborders, Erpobdelliformes and Hirudiniformes (sometimes also called the Pharyngobdelliformes and Gnathobdelliformes, respectively).

== Taxonomy ==
Historically, the Arhynchobdellida were split into two orders, the Gnathobdellida and the Pharyngobdellida. The Gnathobdellida were jawed and carnivorous or parasitic while the Pharyngobdellida were jawless and carnivorous. Current taxonomy accepts the order Arhynchobdellida and divides into two suborders. There are 215 species of Arhynchobdellid leech, in 47 genera and 13 families. The placement of Americobdellidae is uncertain; it has rudimentary jaws and is terrestrial.

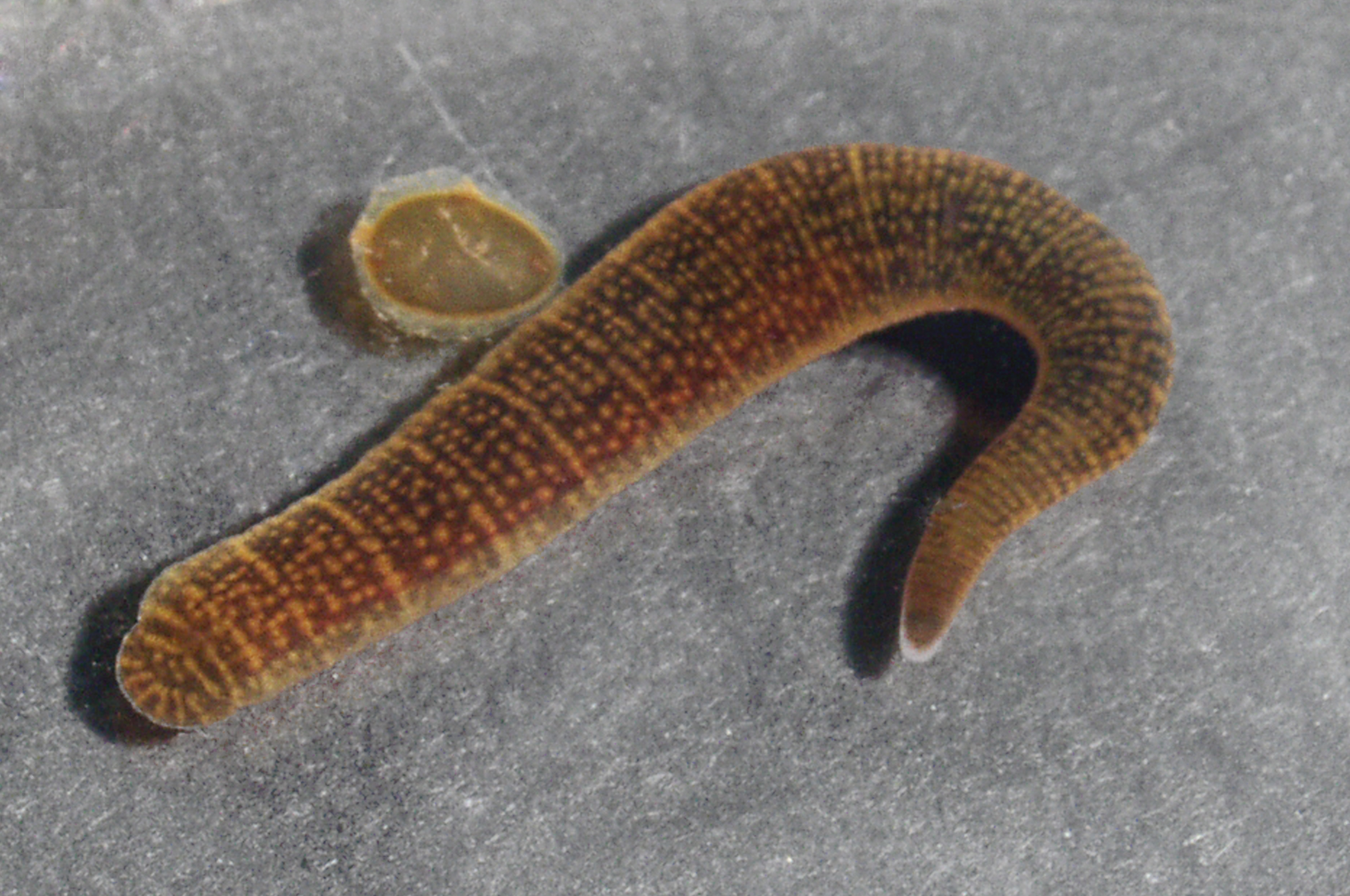
Erpobdella octoculata (Erpobdelliformes:Erpobdellidae)

=== Erpobdelliformes ===
Erpobdelliformes are jawless predators of aquatic invertebrates of varying sizes, including insect larvae, mollusks, and other annelids. Unlike other leeches, they do not penetrate the skin of hosts; and are not at all parasitic. The pharynx is spirally twisted and very large to allow for large prey; it can constitute up to one third of the leech's body length.

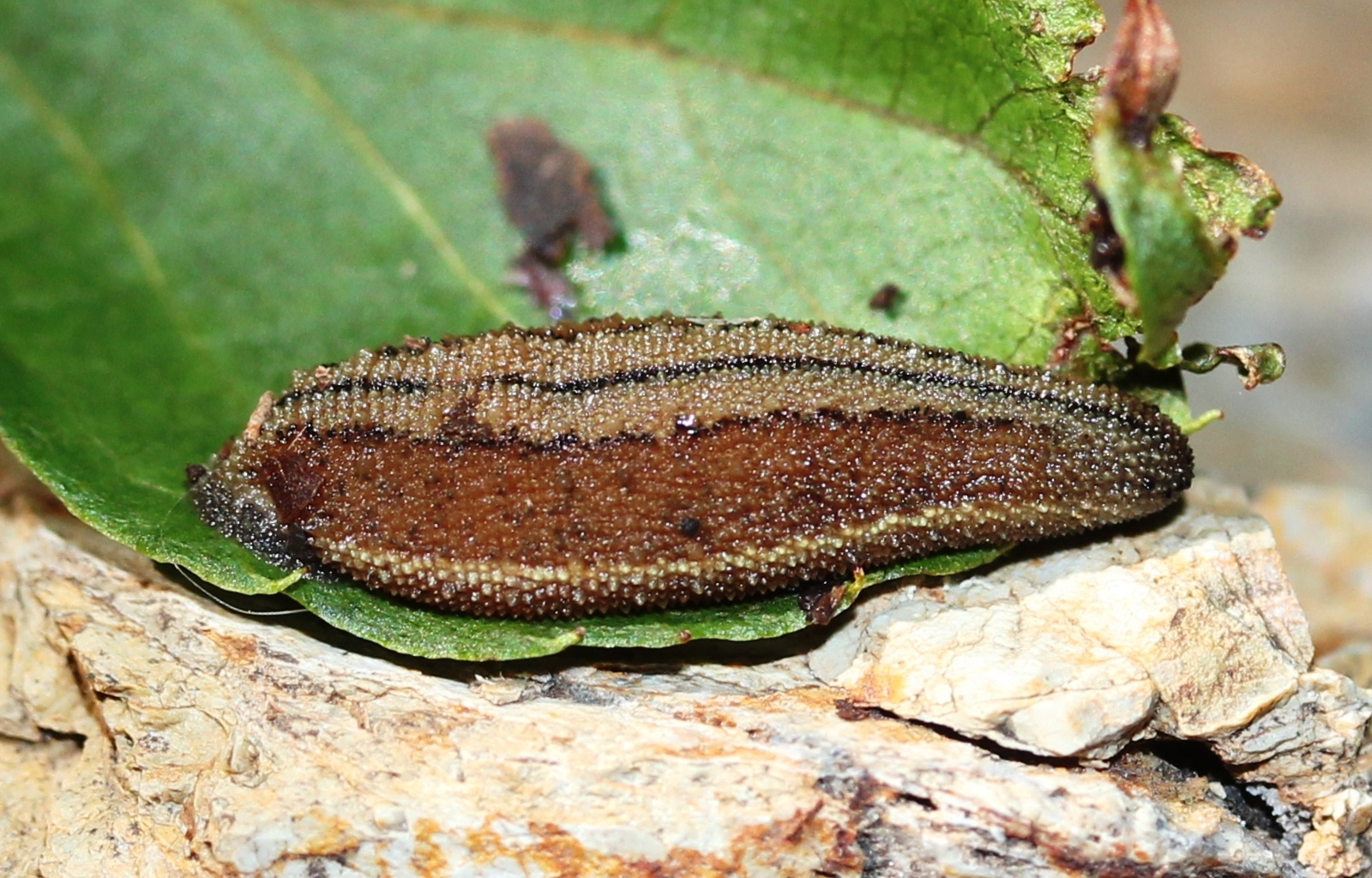
Haemipsida zeylanica japonica (Hirudiniformes:Haemipsidae)

=== Hirudiniformes ===
Hirudiniformes are a diverse suborder defined by the presence of toothed jaws.

=== Cladogram ===
- Hirudinea
  - Arhynchobdellida
    - Erpobdelliformes
      Americobdellidae ?
      Terrestrial, jawed*, carnivorous
    - Erpobdellidae
      Aquatic, jawless, carnivorous
    - Salifidae
      Aquatic, jawless, carnivorous
  - - Hirudiniformes
      Americobdellidae ?
      Terrestrial, jawed*, carnivorous
    - Cylicobdellidae
      Terrestrial, jawed, carnivorous
    - Haemadipsidae
      Terrestrial, jawed, almost all sanguivorous
    - Haemopidae
      Semi-aquatic, jawed, sanguivorous
    - Hirudinidae
      Terrestrial, jawed, carnivorous
    - Macrobdellidae
    - Praobdellidae
      Aquatic, jawed, sanguivorous
    - Semiscolecidae
    - Xerobdellidae
      Terrestrial, jawed, sanguivorous
- Rhynchobdellida
