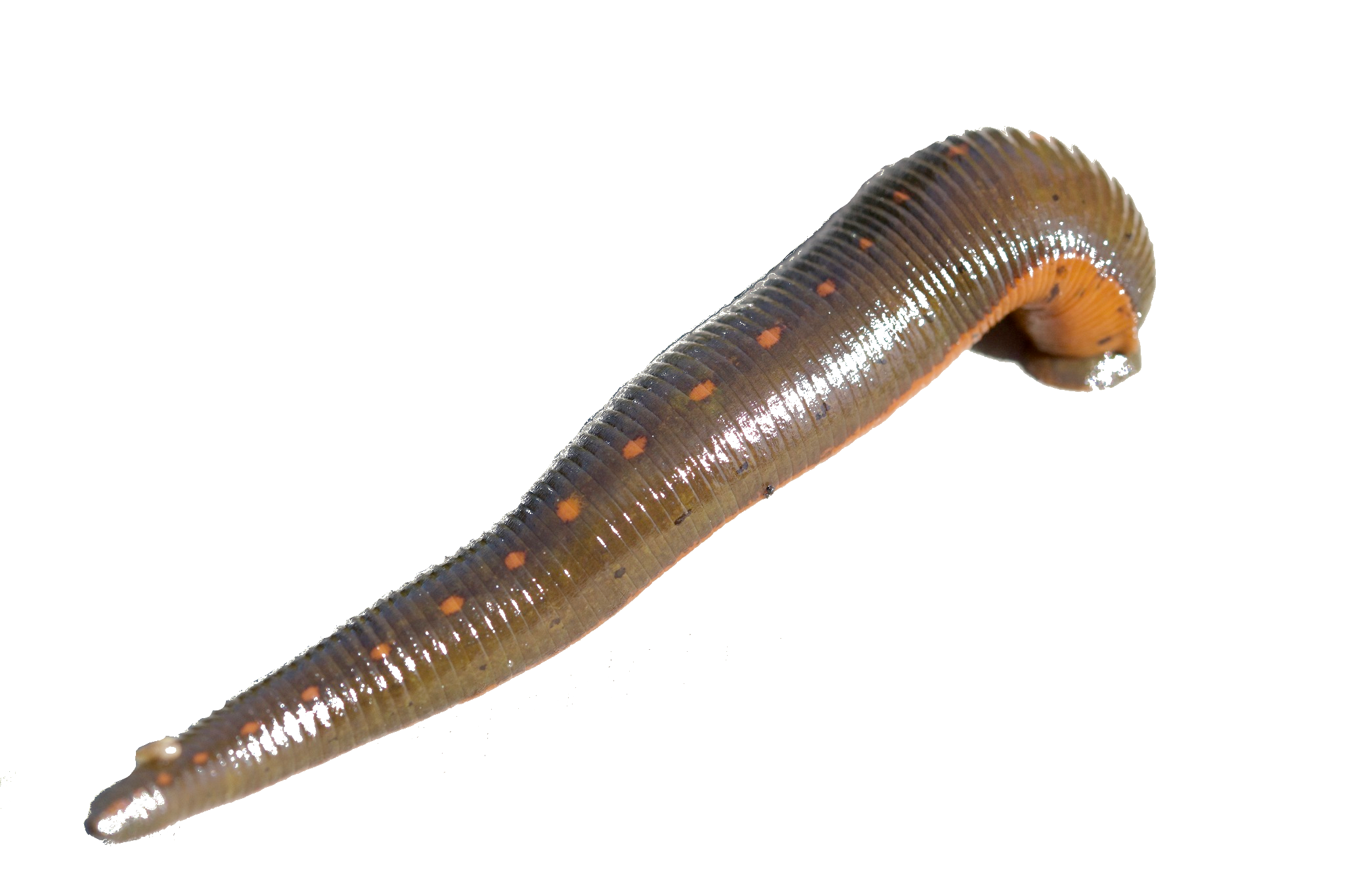

Scientific classification
- Kingdom: Animalia
- Phylum: Annelida
- Clade: Pleistoannelida
- Clade: Sedentaria
- Class: Clitellata
- Subclass: Hirudinea
- Order: Arhynchobdellida
- Family: Macrobdellidae
- Genus: Macrobdella
- Species: M. decora

Binomial name
- Macrobdella decora (Say, 1824)
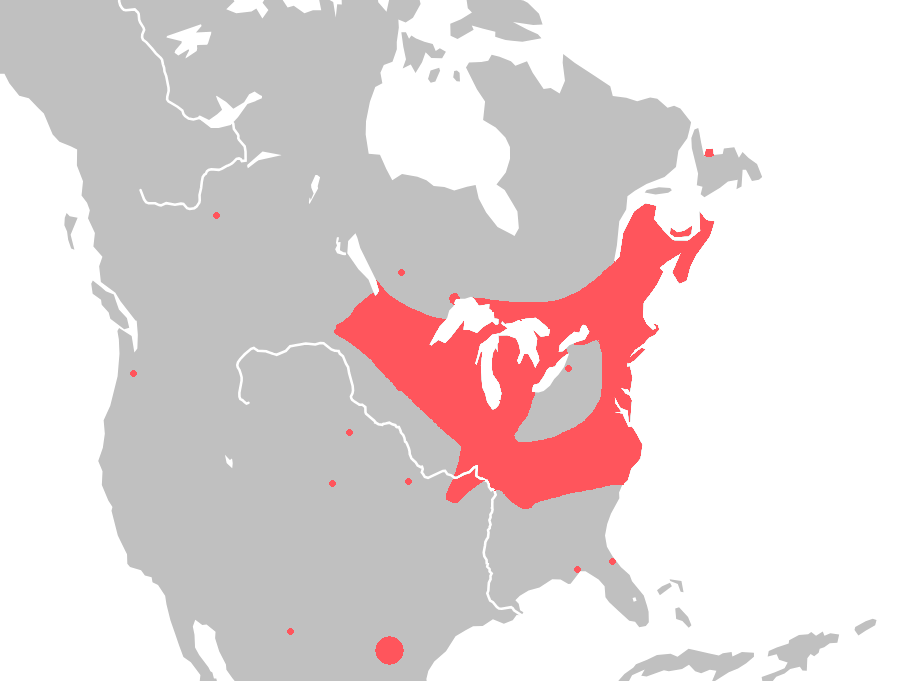
- Observed

Synonyms
- Hirudo decora Say, 1824

= Macrobdella decora =

North American medicinal leech

Species of leech

Macrobdella decora, also known as the North American medicinal leech, is a species of leech found in much of eastern North America in freshwater habitats. M. decora is a parasite of vertebrates, including humans, and an aquatic predator of eggs, larvae, and other invertebrates. It is a medium-sized leech with a spotted greenish-brown back and a reddish or orange underbelly with black spots. It has ten ocelli, or simple eyes, arranged in a horseshoe shape, as well as three long jaws. Internally, a pharynx takes up a tenth of its digestive tract; a stomach, the majority of its body length. The stomach connects to an intestine, followed by a colon, a rectum, and finally an anus located on the leech's back. M. decora, like all leeches, is hermaphroditic, and has twenty testisacs and two ovisacs, in addition to male and female genital pores. First described by Thomas Say in 1824, the species is now placed in the genus Macrobdella. Its closest relative is believed to be the species Macrobdella diplotertia. It is not considered to be endangered.

Macrobdella decora is found in North America east of the Rocky Mountains: in southern Canada and the neighbouring parts of the United States. There is, however, one disjunct population of leeches living in northern Mexico. The species may be able to mix and breed randomly across most of its range, but further research into the topic is needed. The saliva of M. decora contains a blood thinner dubbed "decorsin" which may be unique to the species. A comparison of the saliva of M. decora and that of European species has led researchers to the conclusion that blood-sucking in jawed leeches likely evolved from a single origin.

== Taxonomy ==
Macrobdella decora was originally placed in the genus Hirudo by Thomas Say, who described it in 1824 in an appendix to a book about an expedition up the Minnesota River. Three other species were described in the same pages: Placobdella parasitica, Nephelis lateralis, and Haemopis marmorata. Besides a brief physical description, Say noted that the species was "much smaller" than the other leeches he had described and was "comparatively rare." When Addison Emery Verrill erected the genus Macrobdella in 1872, he transferred Say's species into it. Macro simply means 'big', while bdella means 'leech' in Greek. It is commonly known as the North American medicinal leech.

Macrobdella decora is most closely related (the sister taxon) to Macrobdella diplotertia. Macrobdella ditreta was previously believed to be sister to the clade comprising decora and diplotertia, but a new species, Macrobdella mimicus, was discovered in 2019 and placed as the sister taxon to that clade. The genus Macrobdella was formerly believed to be a monophyletic grouping, but the 2019 paper that described M. mimicus concluded that Macrobdella was in fact a paraphyletic taxon. Macrobdella decora, M. diplotertia, and M. mimicus form one monophyletic clade. However, Macrobdella ditreta is more distantly related, and the grouping Macrobdella is paraphyletic as it excludes the monophyletic Philobdella clade. The 2019 researchers, led by Anna J. Phillips, used both maximum likelihood and maximum parsimony techniques to work out the phylogeny of the Macrobdellidae, and the techniques yielded slightly different results, with parsimony supporting the genus Philobdella as sister to the decora, diplotertia, and mimicus clade and the maximum likelihood analysis putting it sister to M. ditreta.

Parsimony analysis

- Macrobdellidae
  - Oxyptychus
  - - M. ditreta
    - - Philobdella
      - - - - M. decora
            - M. diplotertia
          - M. mimicus

After Phillips et al., 2019.

Maximum-likelihood analysis

- Macrobdellidae
  - Oxyptychus
  - - - M. ditreta
      - Philobdella
    - - - M. decora
        - M. diplotertia
      - M. mimicus

After Phillips et al., 2019.

== Description ==
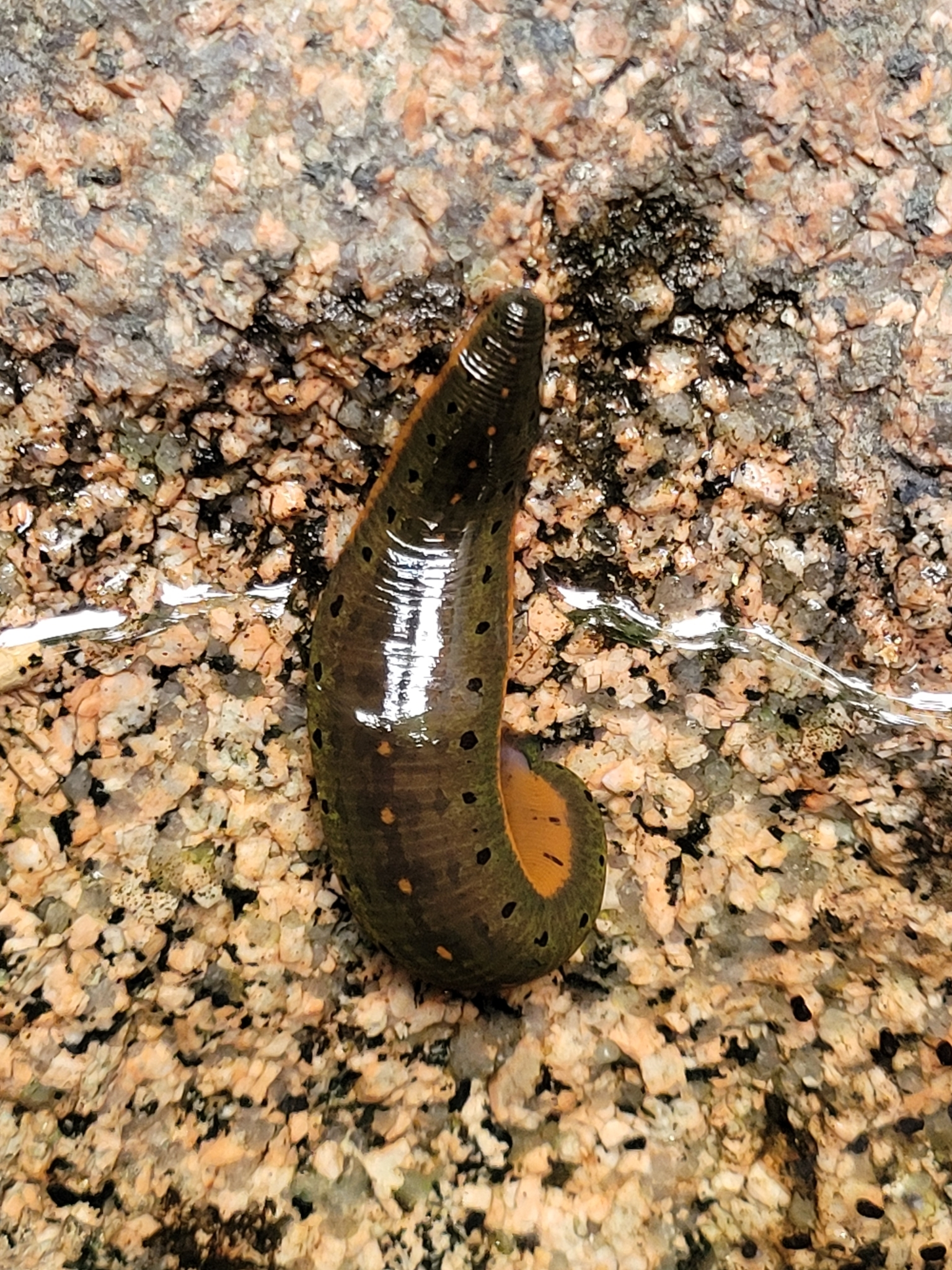
Individual in Maine, with orange mid-line and black side spots all visible

Macrobdella decora is a medium-sized leech, growing between 5 and 8.5 cm (2.0 and 3.3 in) long, and weighing from 1.5 to 3.7 grams (0.053 to 0.131 oz), based on six specimens. It has a dark green, brown or olive-green back with a line of 20 or so small orange or red dots down the middle, and two corresponding sets of black dots on its sides. Its underbelly is reddish or orange with black spots dispersed irregularly across it. Its back is rounded but its belly is flattened. All leech species have 32 segments, but these divisions are obscured by numerous external ring markings called annuli; M. decora has "from 90 to 94 annuli" in total.

=== Anatomy ===
The head of M. decora is rounded and has ten simple eyes on the front of its body: one pair between segments two and three; a second pair on segment three; a third on four; a fourth on six; and a fifth and final pair on segment nine. They are arranged in the shape of a horseshoe. The nervous system includes twenty-one neuron clusters called ganglia and a nervous cord running the length of the body, comprising two parallel fibres enclosed for most of their length in one sheath. The first and last of the ganglia are larger than the others, and connect to five and seven nerves respectively, whereas the other nineteen connect to four or fewer nerves each. The brain is located above the pharynx. The brain is two-parted, with each half connecting to the five ocelli on that side of the body with corresponding optic nerves. Leech jaws are chitinous blades with sharp, serrated edges. Macrobdella decora has three long jaws which are semicircular and laterally compressed, each with one row of about sixty-five "extremely sharp" teeth. Each jaw uses a saw-like motion to cut open its victim's skin.

M. decora has a large muscular pharynx which accounts for the first tenth of the leech's digestive tract. The stomach is not nearly as muscular as the pharynx, but it occupies about five sixths of the leech's total body length and is subdivided into eleven chambers. The intestine extends from behind the stomach and narrows towards the anus. The last part of the intestine is the colon, followed finally by a small rectum. The anus is located on the leech's back, above its circular acetabulum, a large posterior sucker.

Nephridia are understood to be the primary organs handling the balance between salt and water in leeches. A 1987 study examined how M. decora withstood osmotic shock (a shock caused by sudden alteration in the concentration of a given solute, resulting in dehydration via osmosis) and found that the nephridia could not tolerate hypertonicity (overly salty solutions), and, when compared with the European Hirudo medicinalis, the North American species was relatively inefficient at the swift removal of surplus water and salt.

==== Reproductive anatomy ====
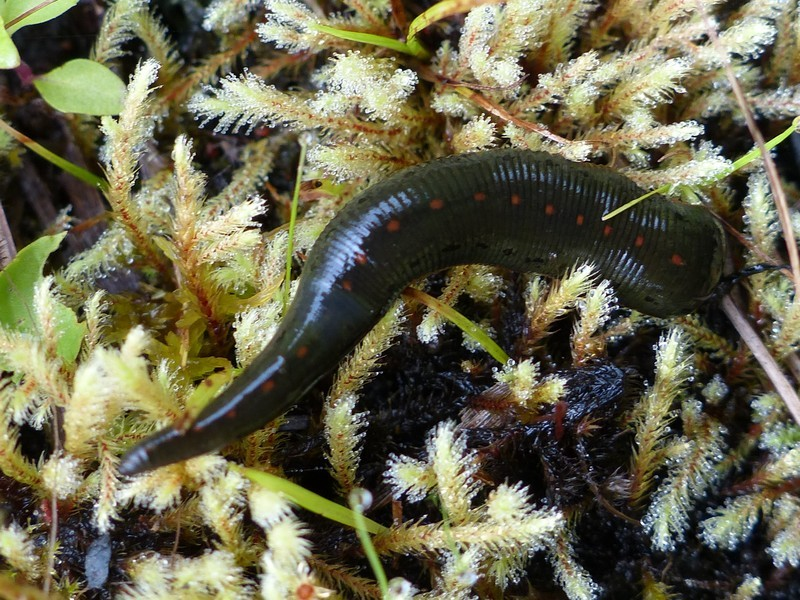
An individual from Buckingham, Quebec

All leeches are hermaphrodites whose male reproductive organs mature first and the female ones later. Testisacs are separate sperm-producing parts of the main body cavity; similarly, ovisacs are parts of the cavity which contain tissues specialized for oogenesis. The ovisacs connect to the leech vagina via oviducts, while epididymes connect the vas deferens with the ejaculatory ducts. M. decora has ten pairs of testisacs located from segments thirteen to twenty-three, with large, compact, and much-coiled epididymes, and crescent-shaped or globular ovisacs which are located in the thirteenth segment. A 2023 paper described the leech's oviducts as "thin" and "torturously folded". The male and female gonopores, which are external openings to the internal reproductive organs, are usually separated by five annuli, or external rings; this degree of separation is an important feature for identifying the species. The male gonopore, when withdrawn, appears as nothing more than a hole in between segments eleven and twelve; however, when the male gonopore and its surrounding parts are everted, they appear as a small cone with deeply furrowed sides, the organ being at the tip. The leech's four copulatory glands are arrayed in a square in an area of rough skin on segments thirteen and fourteen.

=== Saliva ===
Leech saliva is known to contain several compounds, including hirudin, an anticoagulant. The saliva of M. decora is also known to contain several substances not previously all identified from the same leech, as well as an anticoagulant dubbed decorsin which might be unique to M. decora. The set of all mRNA expressed in M. decora saliva (its transcriptome) was described in 2010. A 2019 paper published in the Journal of Parasitology compared hirudin and decorsin from M. decora, as well as hirudin and "hirudin-like factors" – substances which resemble hirudin but are not known to act as anticoagulants – obtained from European species. The authors concluded that blood-sucking among jawed leeches evolved from a single origin.

== Ecology ==
=== Distribution and habitat ===
Macrobdella decora is the most widely distributed Macrobdella species, and it is found in North America east of the Rocky Mountains in southern Canada and the neighbouring United States. There is, however, one isolated population in Mexico, in the state of Nuevo León. For the most part, M. decora does not occur south of Virginia, Macrobdella ditreta being the dominant leech species in the southern United States. However, M. decora has been found in the southern Appalachian Mountains in Georgia and South Carolina. Leeches of the species have been found as far west as Alberta, North Dakota, Nebraska, Colorado, and New Mexico. At the eastern end of their range, they are also found on Prince Edward Island. M. decora is possibly panmictic (i.e., mixing and breeding randomly) across much of its range. Some populations in Ontario and New England have refrained from panmixia, and, furthermore, a 2024 paper that studied the geographic distribution of the species' genetic diversity (phylogeography) concluded that it should not be assumed "that M. decora is truly panmictic" across the study's large range, and that more research into the topic was needed.

Macrobdella decora is a freshwater species that is found in still or slow-moving water bodies such as streams, temporary ponds, ditches, and wetlands. They are particularly common in temporary ponds; the leeches are able to burrow into the bottom when the pond dries up. They are able to survive some time on land, and have been found up to 30 metres (98 ft) away from aquariums in which they were kept. They may also attach to a terrestrial host such as a mammal or bird and follow the host onto shore. Nonetheless, their overland biological dispersal ability "is assumed to be limited". In lakes, the leeches are most active in the epilimnion, or top-most layer.

NatureServe lists the species as Secure within Ontario, but no assessment has been completed for other regions. M. decora was described as unendangered in a 2021 paper on its gut microbiome. As of October 2025, M. decora was the most-observed species of leech in Canada on the citizen science platform iNaturalist, and the second-most-observed species in the United States, after Placobdella parasitica.

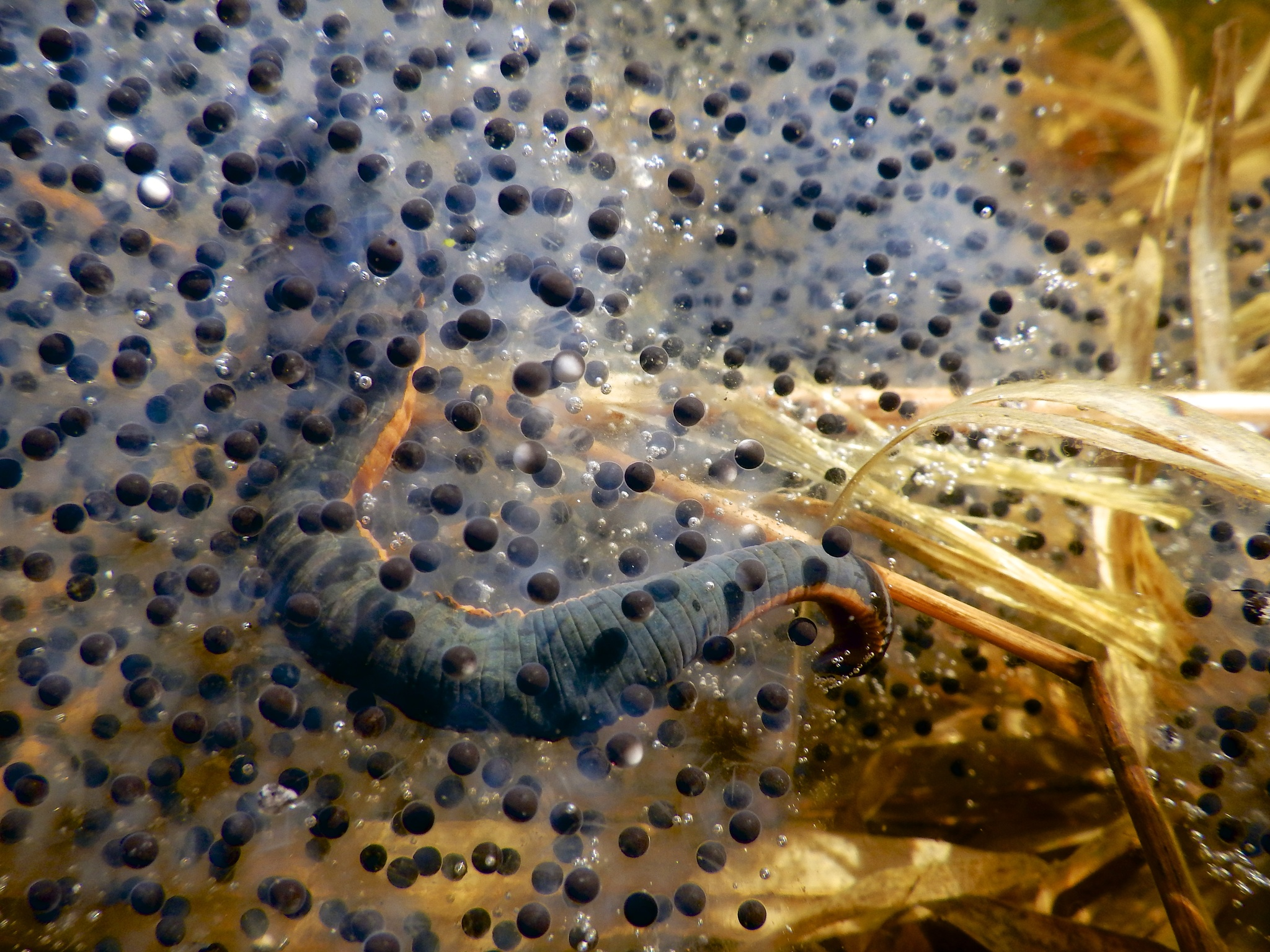
An individual swimming through a cloud of wood frog eggs in Connecticut

=== Parasitism and diet ===
Macrobdella decora is both parasitic and predaceous. Using its teeth to pierce the host's skin, it sucks the blood of many vertebrates, including humans but also amphibians, fish, turtles, wading birds, and cattle. The leech can remain attached to its host for up to two hours. It also hunts voraciously, and eats oligochaete worms, snails, amphibian eggs, the larvae of insects, and even other individuals of its own species. In the spring, the leech's aggressive predation of American toad eggs may lead to up to 80% mortality. The leeches have also been recorded hunting amphibian larvae: in 2020, a leech was found preying on tiger salamander larvae in Minnesota. However, M. decora is also preyed on by Haemopis grandis, a predator and scavenger leech. The leeches are also themselves parasitized by trematodes, a new species of which, Alloglossidum hamrumi, was described from the intestine of a specimen of M. decora in 1976.

=== Reproduction ===
The leeches engorge themselves with blood before mating. One or two months after feeding, they produce spongy cocoons, which are pale yellow and elliptical in shape. About another month later, the young, only 20 to 22 millimetres (0.79 to 0.87 in) long, emerge. They will take several years to become fully mature.

=== Gut microbiome ===
The gut microbiome is simply the collection of microorganisms living in an animal's digestive system. The gut microbiome of the North American Macrobdella decora is quite similar to that of Europe's Hirudo verbana. Bacteria of the genera Aeromonas, Bacteroides, Butyricicoccus, and Proteocatella dominate M. decora's gut microbiota. The intraluminal fluid – that is, fluids found in the gut – was found to be most abundant with bacteria like Aeromonas and Bacteroidales; combined, on median they represented 60% of microbiota living in the fluids, while much of the rest was Clostridiales, which on median accounted for 30% of the microbiota.

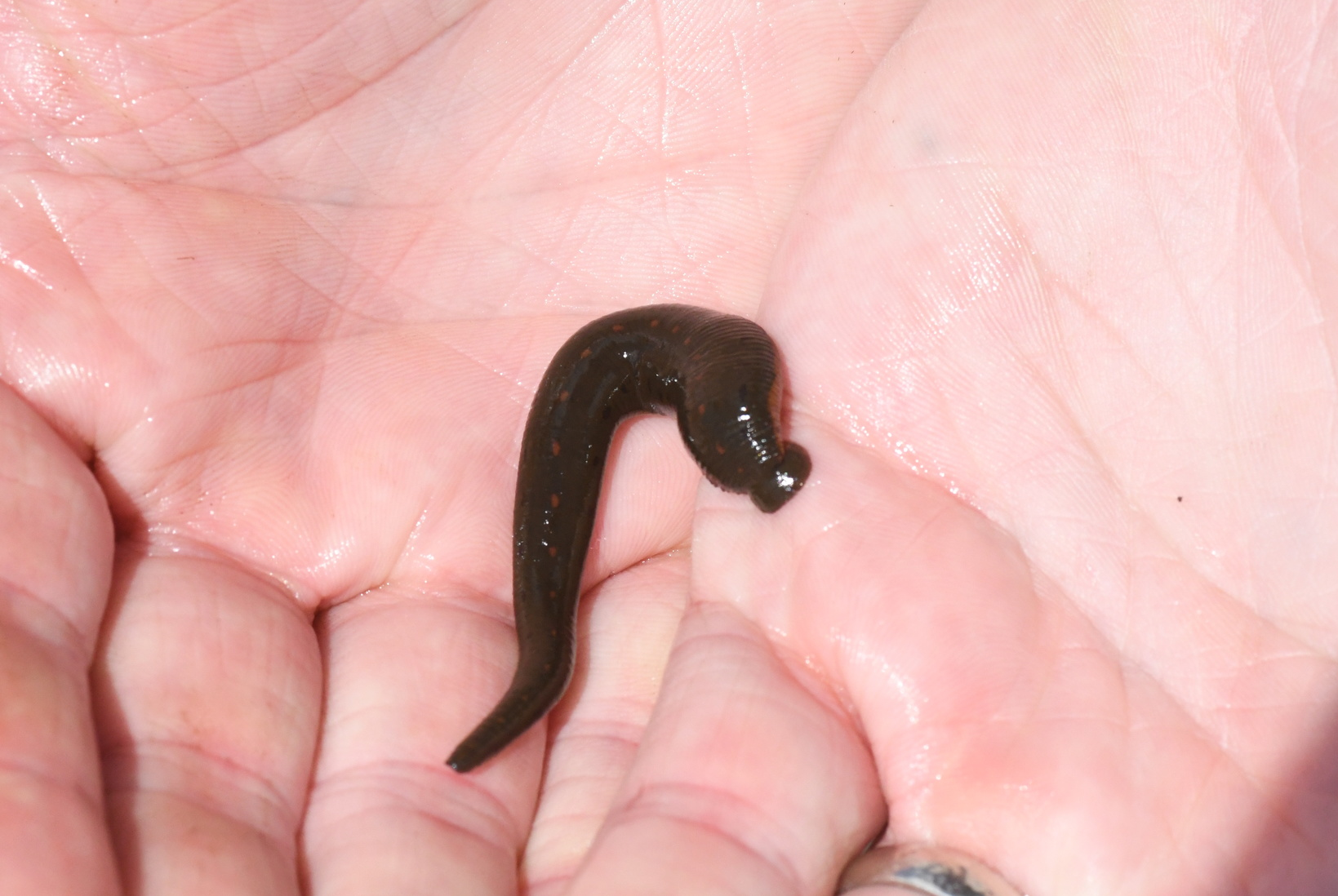
M. decora on a human hand in Algonquin Provincial Park

== Interactions with humans ==
Macrobdella decora may parasitize humans and is often encountered by people swimming in Canada and the northern United States. Sometimes swimming areas have had to be restricted or closed due to the leech's presence. In Europe, Hirudo medicinalis was traditionally used for bloodletting. Despite its common name as a "medicinal leech", M. decora was historically not used very often for this purpose. However, there is some evidence of their medicinal use as a replacement to European leeches, specifically in Philadelphia during the 19th century. Indeed, Addison Emery Verrill, writing in 1872, noted M. decora's use by doctors as a stand-in for "imported leeches", and he noted the North American species was "equally efficacious". It is possible that human leech-trading helped move leeches between water bodies. According to a 2024 paper, they are sometimes used by anglers for fishing bait, and they may be transported for that reason. However, they are not a preferred choice, due to a tendency to get free of collection traps. Fish are also claimed anecdotally by fishers to find them less attractive than other leech species.
