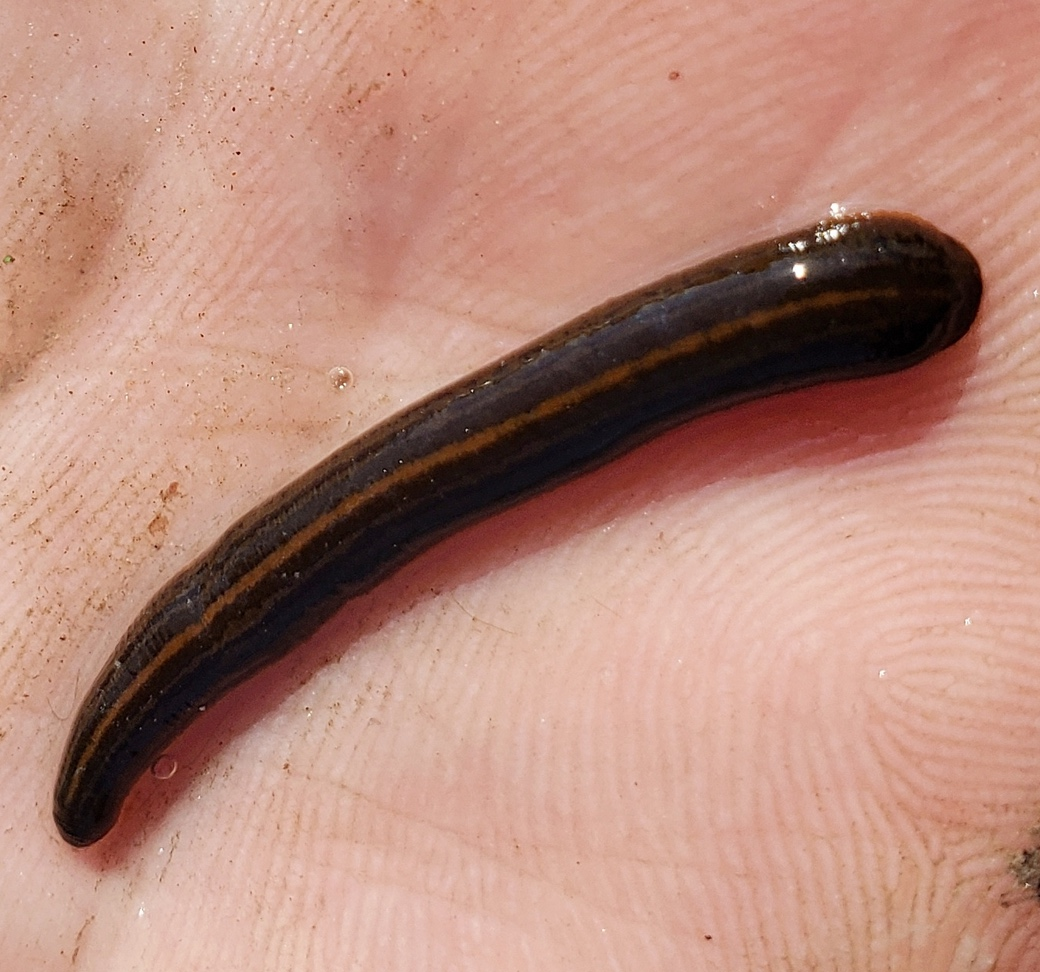
- Philobdella gracilis on a human hand in Louisiana.

Scientific classification
- Kingdom: Animalia
- Phylum: Annelida
- Clade: Pleistoannelida
- Clade: Sedentaria
- Class: Clitellata
- Subclass: Hirudinea
- Order: Arhynchobdellida
- Family: Macrobdellidae
- Genus: Philobdella
- Species: P. gracilis

Binomial name
- Philobdella gracilis Moore, 1901

Synonyms
- Philobdella gracile Moore, 1901; Philobdella floridana sensu Moore, 1898

= Philobdella gracilis =

Species of leech

Philobdella gracilis is a species of leech in the family Macrobdellidae found in the central and southern United States. The scientific name is derived from Greek and Latin and could be roughly translated to "slender, beloved leech".

== Taxonomy ==
Philobdella gracilis was first scientifically described in 1901 by John Percy Moore in The Hirudinea of Illinois, a lengthy article published in the Bulletin of the Illinois State Library of Natural History. Moore named it Philobdella gracile. Moore had actually found P. gracilis three years earlier in New Orleans but had at the time identified it as Philobdella floridana; he corrected the mistake when he formally described the species in 1901. The genus name, Philobdella, is derived from Greek: philos (φῐ́λος), meaning ῾beloved" or "pleasant" and bdella (βδέλλᾰ), which simply means leech. The specific epithet is the Latin gracilis and means "slender". The scientific name as a whole has been described as a "kind of grim joke". Addison Emery Verrill, the zoologist who first erected the taxon Philobdella in 1874, (Note: The taxon was created as a subgenus but was later raised to genus level, though Verrill already noted in his original description that "it may be hereafter necessary to make it a distinct genus".) did not provide a reason for the name.

In the 20th century, the distinction between Moore's species (Philobdella gracilis) and Verrill's (P. floridana) became clouded. P. floridana's validity as a species was questioned, including by Moore himself. In the 1970s, Laurence Richardson "attempted to stabilize" the genus' taxonomy, but his redescription of P. gracilis was based on a misidentification. In 2005, Anna Phillips and Mark Siddall published a paper in Zoologica Scripta on the taxonomy of the family Macrobdellidae to which Philobdella belongs. They established that the two species can be "readily" distinguished based on the serrations of their jaws. They also noted that the genus Philobdella had a fair amount of genetic diversity, supporting the existence of two species. A research note published in 2011 by a large group of American scientists summarized the past confusion and finally clarified the distributions of the two species.

=== Phylogenetics ===
Macrobdellidae is a family of New World jawed leeches. It includes two other genera, Macrobdella and Oxyptychus. 2005 and 2019 phylogenetic studies led by Phillips both concluded that the two Philobdella species are more closely related to each other than to any other species and that the genus is monophyletic: it includes their most recent common ancestor and does not exclude any descendant organisms.

== Description ==
Philobdella-genus leeches in general can be distinguished from other genera by the distance of separation of their gonopores (3 or 4 annuli), which may be hidden by rough skin in mature adults, and by the teeth on their jaws, which are particularly small and arranged in two rows.

=== General appearance ===
Philobdella gracilis are medium-sized to moderately large leeches, growing up to 6 centimetres (2.4 in) long; when fully extended they can measure 8.4 centimetres (3.3 in) long and 0.8 centimetres (0.31 in) across. They have distinctive colouration: the back is mostly dark with a pale yellow stripe extending down the centre of the back, fading out somewhat at the front and rear ends of the body. It is flanked by two fainter yet broader yellow or brown lines towards the sides of the back. There are also rows of dark brown or black spots, irregularly spaced, to either side of the line. The belly (ventral side) of the leech is paler in colour and scattered with dark blotches, which are densest at the sides of the leech's body.

=== Anatomy ===
Moore thought the leech's "straight and simple" alimentary canal most similar to leeches of the genus Haemopis. The jaws of P. gracilis, on the other hand, he compared to those of Diplobdella.

== Ecology ==
As Moore's first description of the species focused mainly on physical characteristics, with only one short paragraph dedicated to its diet. Much of our present knowledge of the habits and ecology of Philobdella gracilis come from a paper by Percy Viosca, published posthumously in 1962. Viosca's paper was the result of ten years of observations of the leech, but the species' biology is still poorly understood.

=== Distribution and habitat ===
The genus Philobdella is endemic to the United States, with P. floridana found along the southeastern coast and P. gracilis being distributed further west. P. gracilis is currently believed to be found primarily around the Mississippi River and its tributaries, from Louisiana and adjacent Mississippi on the Gulf of Mexico as far north as southern Missouri and Illinois. Eastwards, it has also been recorded in eastern Oklahoma and Texas. P. gracilis was observed by Moore in New Orleans in Louisiana, but was described based on specimens from Illinois. Viosca described the leeches' habitat in his home state of Louisiana. The leeches are found in wetlands and muddy water bodies: in swamps, freshwater marshes, bayous, and ditches. They reside in dark waters and spend the day buried in silt. They favour shallow waters, from 15 to 46 centimetres (6 to 18 in) deep.

=== Diet and behaviour ===
Moore wrote that the leeches he had observed preyed "in part at least on weaker creatures", citing the presence of the remains of an earthworm (of the genus Allolobophora) in one specimen's alimentary canal. Moore noted that the species might also occasionally feed on blood. According to Viosca, P. gracilis could often be found attached to many species of amphibians, possibly with a preference for the bullfrog as a host. He also described how when wading in a pool with bare legs, disturbing the muddy bottom could induce the leeches to his legs, but that they had never attempted to actually suck his blood nor, to his knowledge, were they any records of the leeches parasitizing humans. He drily noted that "if they did, this would be a well known fact", as many people regularly worked in leech-infested areas and "the public has a tendency to exaggerate rather than suppress facts."

== Bibliography ==
- Moore, John P. (February 1901). "The Hirudinea of Illinois". Bulletin of the Illinois State Library of Natural History. 5 XII: 479–547.
- ————— (1959). "23. Hirudinea". In Edmondson, W T (ed.). Fresh-water biology (2nd ed.). Wiley. pp. 542–57.
- Moser, William E; Klemm, Donald J; Phillips, Anna J; et al. (2011). "Distribution of the genus Philobdella (Macrobdellidae: Hirudinida), including new locality records from Arkansas and Oklahoma". Comparative Parisitology. 78 (2).
- Phillips, Anna J; Siddall, Mark (November 2005). "Phylogeny of the New World medicinal leech family Macrobdellidae". Zoologica Scripta. 34 (6): 559–564. doi:10.1111/j.1463-6409.2005.00210.x.
- Phillips, Anna J; Salas-Montiel, Ricardo; et al. (15 August 2019). "Phylogenetic position and description of a new species of medicinal leech from the eastern United States". Journal of Parasitology. 105 (4): 587–597. doi:10.1645/18-119.
- Sawyer, Roy T (1972). North American freshwater leeches, exclusive of the Piscicolidae (PDF). Illinois Biological Monographs. Vol. 46. University of Illinois Press. ISBN 0-252-00214-8.
- Viosca, Percy (1962). "Observations on the biology of the leech Philobdella gracile Moore in southeastern Louisiana". Tulane Studies in Zoology. 9.
