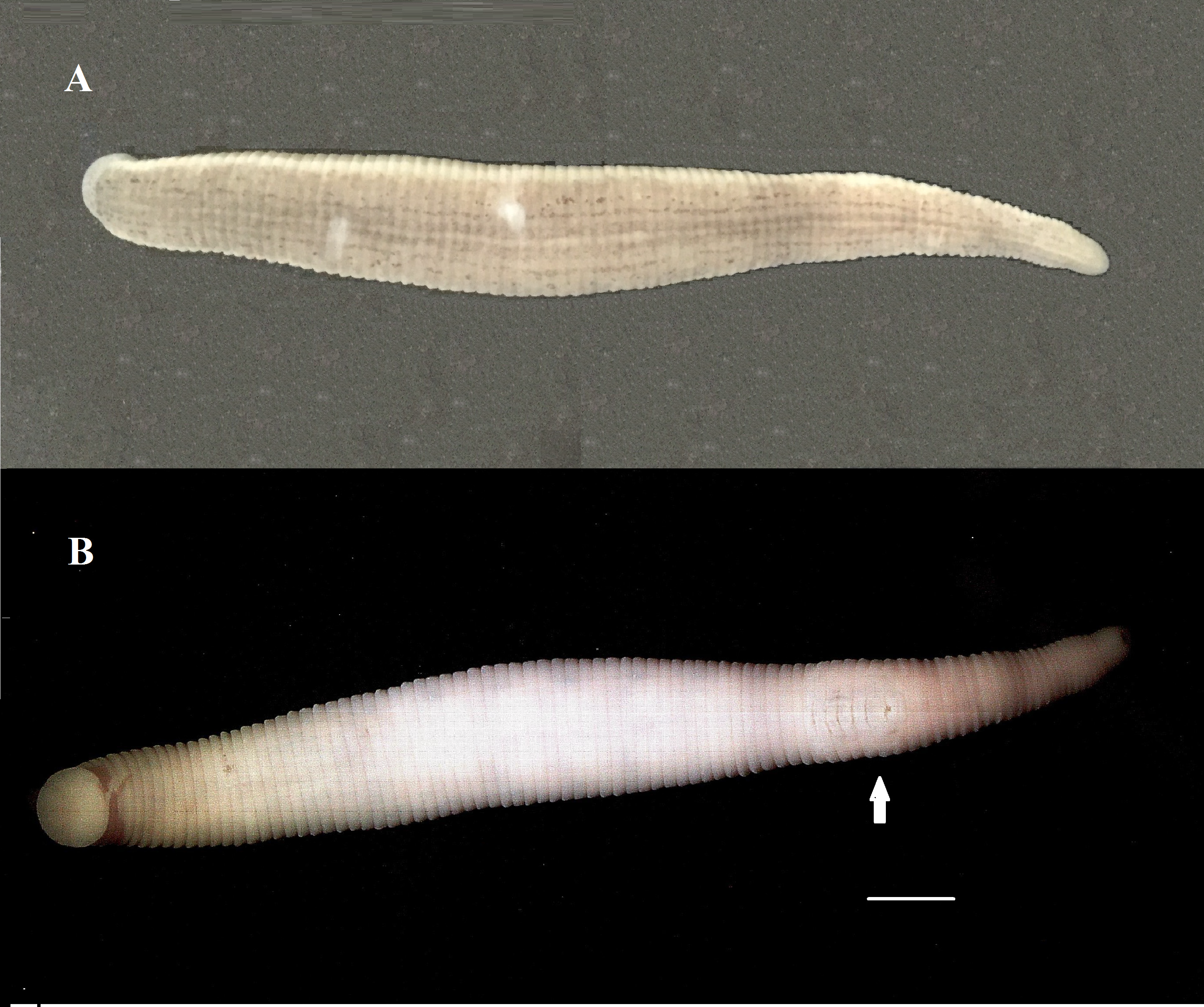

Scientific classification
- Kingdom: Animalia
- Phylum: Annelida
- Clade: Pleistoannelida
- Clade: Sedentaria
- Class: Clitellata
- Subclass: Hirudinea
- Order: Arhynchobdellida
- Suborder: Hirudiniformes
- Family: Macrobdellidae
- Genus: Philobdella
- Species: P. floridana

Binomial name
- Philobdella floridana (Verrill, 1874)

= Philobdella floridana =

Species of annelid

Philobdella floridana is a species of leech that lives in the most southern parts of the United States. It is known only from Lake Okeechobee in Florida, and is probably conspecific with Philobdella gracilis.
