= Macrobdella diplotertia =

Scientific classification
- Domain: Eukaryota
- Kingdom: Animalia
- Phylum: Annelida
- Clade: Pleistoannelida
- Clade: Sedentaria
- Class: Clitellata
- Subclass: Hirudinea
- Order: Arhynchobdellida
- Family: Macrobdellidae
- Genus: Macrobdella
- Species: M. diplotertia

Binomial name
- Macrobdella diplotertia Meyer, 1975

Species of leech

Macrobdella diplotertia, the Ozark highlands leech, is a species of leech found in the southern United States.

M. diplotertia was described in 1975 from Missouri, and has since been recorded from Kansas and Arkansas. It is believed to be the sister taxon to Macrobdella decora. A diagnostic characteristic is the arrangement of the copulatory gland pores. The species can grow up to 66 millimetres (2.6 in) long.
