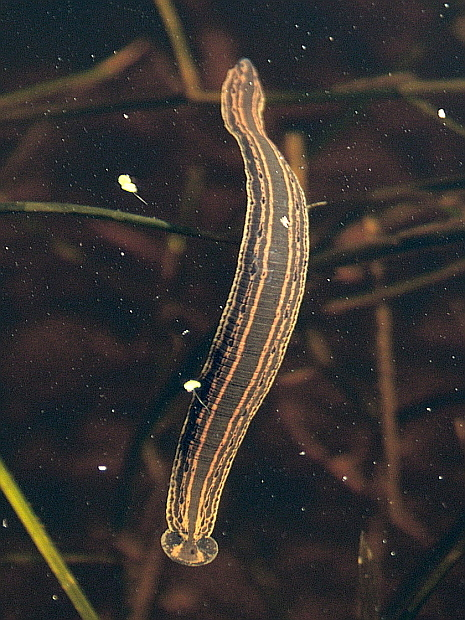

Conservation status
- Near Threatened (IUCN 3.1)
- CITES Appendix II

Scientific classification
- Kingdom: Animalia
- Phylum: Annelida
- Clade: Pleistoannelida
- Clade: Sedentaria
- Class: Clitellata
- Subclass: Hirudinea
- Order: Arhynchobdellida
- Family: Hirudinidae
- Genus: Hirudo
- Species: H. medicinalis

Binomial name
- Hirudo medicinalis Linnaeus, 1758

= Hirudo medicinalis =

Species of annelid worm

Hirudo medicinalis, or the European medicinal leech, is one of several species of leeches used as medicinal leeches.

Other species of Hirudo sometimes also used as medicinal leeches include H. orientalis, H. troctina, and H. verbana. The Asian medicinal leech includes Hirudinaria manillensis, and the North American medicinal leech is Macrobdella decora.

Medicinal leech populations were reduced significantly in many countries during the 19th century due to the high demand in medical contexts, and remain endangered in many countries today.

== Morphology ==
The general morphology of medicinal leeches follows that of most other leeches. Fully mature adults can be up to 20 centimeters in length, and are green, brown, or greenish-brown with a darker tone on the dorsal side and a lighter ventral side. The dorsal side also has a thin red stripe. These organisms have two suckers, one at each end, called the anterior and posterior suckers. The posterior is used mainly for leverage, whereas the anterior sucker, consisting of the jaw and teeth, is where the feeding takes place. Medicinal leeches have three jaws (tripartite) that resemble saws, on which are approximately 100 sharp edges used to incise the host. The incision leaves a mark that is an inverted Y inside of a circle. After piercing the skin, they suck out blood while injecting blood thinners similar to Anophelins; anticoagulants (hirudin). Large adults can consume up to ten times their body weight in a single meal, with 5–15 mL being the average volume taken. These leeches can live for up to a year between feedings.

Medicinal leeches are hermaphrodites that reproduce by sexual mating, laying eggs in clutches of up to 50 near (but not under) water, and in shaded, humid places. A study done in Poland found that medicinal leeches sometimes breed inside the nests of large aquatic birds, noting that conservation efforts directed at bird habitats may also indirectly help preserve dwindling leech populations.

== Range and ecology ==
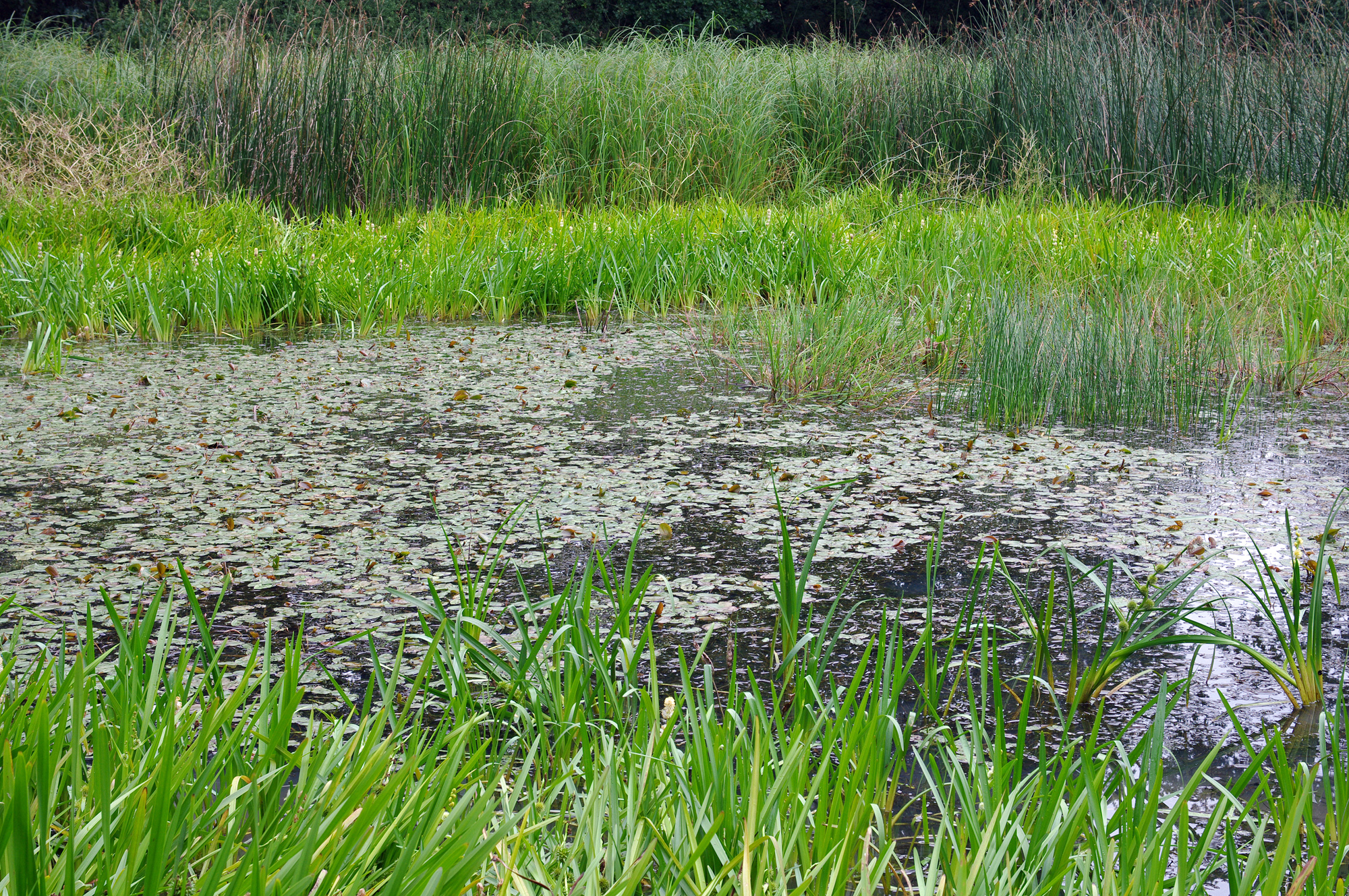
Typical habitat with a large population, Germany

Their range extends over almost the whole of Europe and into Asia as far as Kazakhstan and Uzbekistan. The preferred habitat for this species is muddy freshwater pools and ditches with plentiful weed growth in temperate climates.

Over-exploitation by leech collectors in the 19th century has left only scattered populations, and reduction in natural habitat through drainage has also contributed to their decline. Another factor includes the replacement of horses—medicinal leeches' preferred host species—by motor vehicles and mechanical farming equipment, and the provision of artificial water supplies for cattle. As a result, this species is now considered near threatened by the IUCN, and European medicinal leeches are legally protected through nearly all of their natural range. They are particularly sparsely distributed in France and Belgium, and in the UK there may be as few as 20 remaining isolated populations (all widely scattered). The largest, located at Lydd, England, is estimated to contain several thousand individuals; 12 of these areas have been designated Sites of Special Scientific Interest. There are small, transplanted populations in several countries outside their natural range, including the USA. The species is protected under Appendix II of CITES meaning international trade (including in parts and derivatives) is regulated by the CITES permitting system.

== Medical use ==
=== Beneficial secretions ===
Medicinal leeches have been found to secrete saliva containing about 60 different proteins. These achieve a wide variety of goals useful to the leech as it feeds, helping to keep the blood in liquid form and increasing blood flow in the affected area. Several of these secreted proteins serve as anticoagulants (such as hirudin), platelet aggregation inhibitors (most notably apyrase, collagenase, and calin), vasodilators, and proteinase inhibitors. It is also thought that the saliva contains an anesthetic, as leech bites are generally not painful.

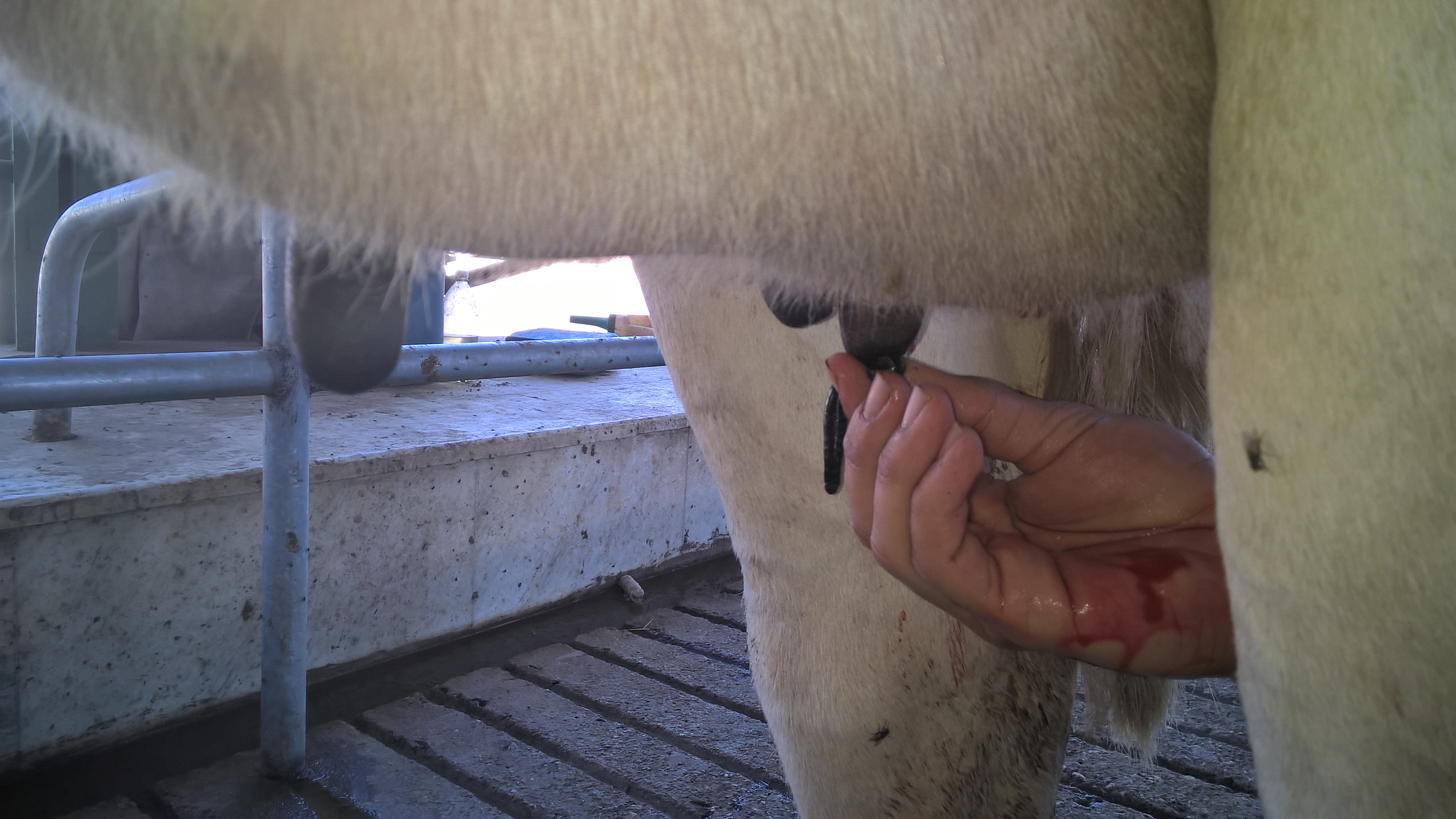
Treating mastitis of a cow with leech

=== Historically ===
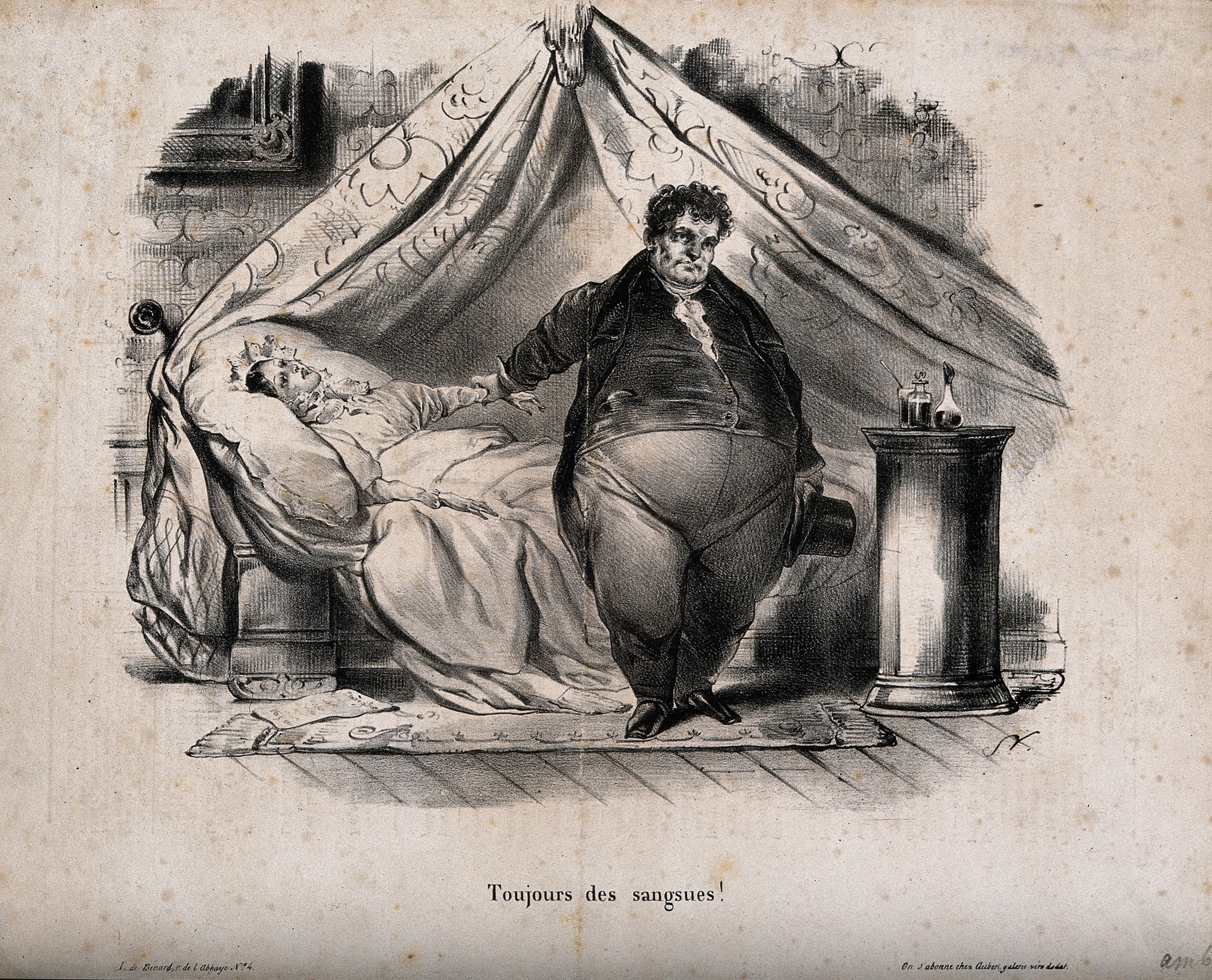
A caricature of a physician prescribing leeches for a weak, bedbound woman

The first recorded use of leech therapy was 3,500 years ago in Ancient Egypt. The next recorded uses of leeches in medicine come in the last few centuries BCE, by the Greek physician Nicander in Colophon and at about the same period in the ancient Sanskrit text Sushruta Samhita. Leech therapy is mentioned a few hundred years later in Shennong Bencaojing, a 3rd-century CE book of traditional Chinese medicine.

Medical use of leeches was discussed by Avicenna in The Canon of Medicine (1020s), and by Abd al-Latif al-Baghdadi in the 12th century.

These sources indicated leech therapy for a wide variety of ailments, including edema, "blood stasis", and skin diseases.

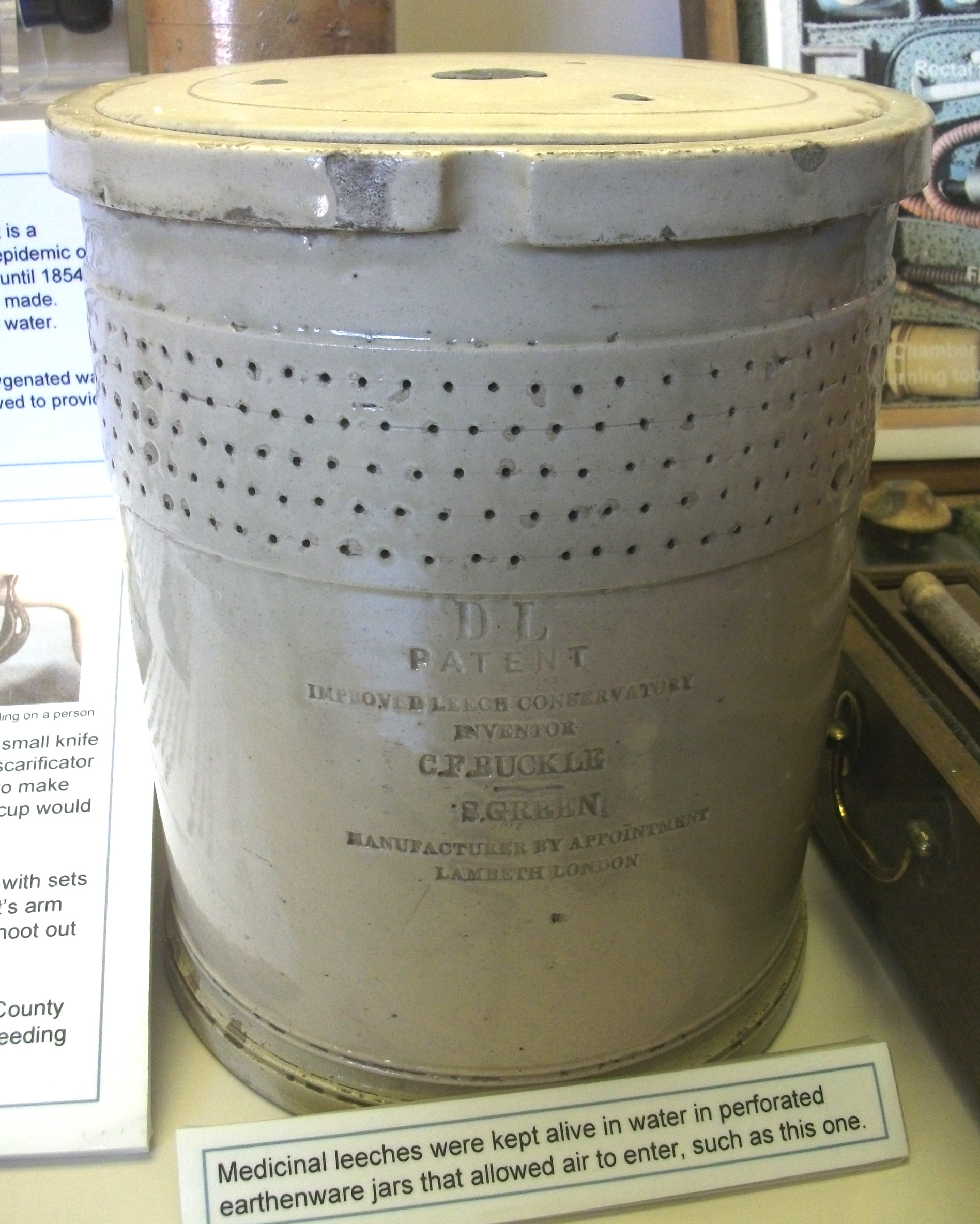
Earthenware jar for holding medicinal leeches

In medieval and early modern European medicine, the medicinal leech (Hirudo medicinalis and its congeners H. verbana, H. troctina, and H. orientalis) was used to remove blood from a patient as part of a process to balance the humors that, according to Galen, must be kept in balance for the human body to function properly. (The four humors of ancient medical philosophy were blood, phlegm, black bile, and yellow bile.) Any sickness that caused the subject's skin to become red (e.g. fever and inflammation), so the theory went, must have arisen from too much blood in the body. Similarly, any person whose behavior was strident and sanguine was thought to be suffering from an excess of blood. Leeches, by removing blood, were thought to help with these kinds of conditions—a wide range which included illnesses like polio and laryngitis. Leeches were often gathered by leech collectors and were eventually farmed in large numbers. A unique 19th-century "Leech House" survives in Bedale, North Yorkshire on the bank of the Bedale Beck, used to store medicinal leeches until the early 20th century.

Manchester Royal Infirmary used 50,000 leeches a year in 1831. The price of leeches varied between one penny and threepence halfpenny each. In 1832 leeches accounted for 4.4% of the total hospital expenditure. The hospital maintained an aquarium for leeches until the 1930s. The use of leeches began to become less widespread towards the end of the 19th century.

=== Current ===
Medicinal leech therapy (also referred to as Hirudotherapy or Hirudin therapy) made an international comeback in the 1970s in microsurgery, used to stimulate circulation in tissues threatened by postoperative venous congestion, particularly in finger reattachment and reconstructive surgery of the ear, nose, lip, and eyelid. Other clinical applications of medicinal leech therapy include varicose veins, muscle cramps, thrombophlebitis, and osteoarthritis, among many varied conditions. The therapeutic effect is not from the small amount of blood taken in the meal, but from the continued and steady bleeding from the wound left after the leech has detached, as well as the anesthetizing, anti-inflammatory, and vasodilating properties of the secreted leech saliva. The most common complication from leech treatment is prolonged bleeding, which can easily be treated, but more serious allergic reactions and bacterial infections may also occur. Leech therapy was classified by the US Food and Drug Administration as a medical device in 2004.

Because of the minuscule amounts of hirudin present in leeches, it is impractical to harvest the substance for widespread medical use. Hirudin (and related substances) are synthesized using recombinant techniques. Devices called "mechanical leeches" that dispense heparin and perform the same function as medicinal leeches have been developed, but they are not yet commercially available.

== See also ==
- Helminthic therapy – other medical use of parasites
- Ichthyotherapy – medical use of fish
