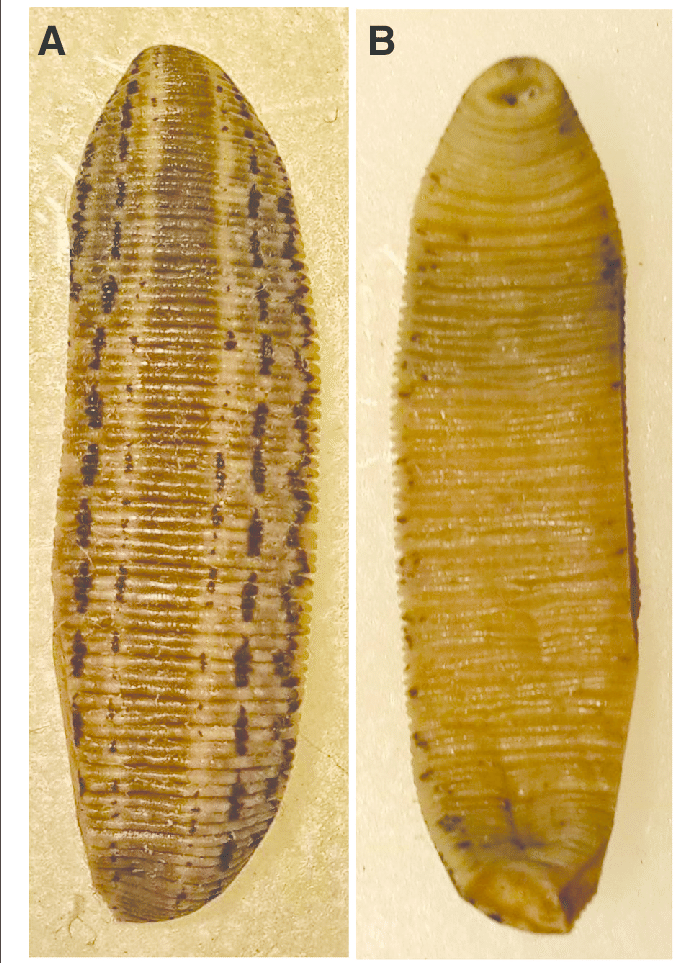
- Dorsal (A) and ventral (B) views of Hirudo sulukii from Sülüklü Lake, Turkey

Scientific classification
- Kingdom: Animalia
- Phylum: Annelida
- Clade: Pleistoannelida
- Clade: Sedentaria
- Class: Clitellata
- Subclass: Hirudinea
- Order: Arhynchobdellida
- Family: Hirudinidae
- Genus: Hirudo
- Species: H. sulukii

Binomial name
- Hirudo sulukii Saglam, Saunders, Lang and Shain 2016

= Hirudo sulukii =

Species of annelid worm

Hirudo sulukii is a species of leech that has been found from Kara Lake of Adiyaman, Sülüklü Lake of Gaziantep and Segirkan wetland of Batman in Turkey.
