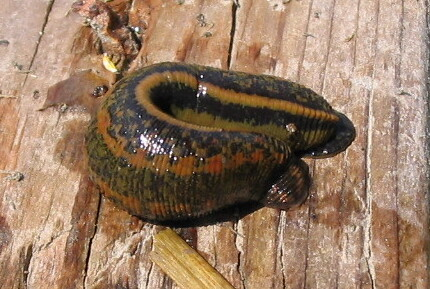
- CITES Appendix II

Scientific classification
- Kingdom: Animalia
- Phylum: Annelida
- Clade: Pleistoannelida
- Clade: Sedentaria
- Class: Clitellata
- Subclass: Hirudinea
- Order: Arhynchobdellida
- Family: Hirudinidae
- Genus: Hirudo
- Species: H. verbana

Binomial name
- Hirudo verbana Carena, 1820

= Hirudo verbana =

Species of leech

Hirudo verbana is a species of leech.

Hirudo verbana has long been used as a medicinal leech under the species H. medicinalis, but has recently been recognized as a separate species distinct from the traditional or European medicinal leech of that name.

== Anatomy ==
The body of this species is composed of 34 segments. Internally, it has a gut (alimentary canal) with two primary sections, the crop and the intestinum/intestine. The crop consists of a primary canal with lateral ceca extending off from it. The crop connects to the intestinum at around the 19th-20th body segment. Alongside the alimentary canal are 17 pairs of nephridia, as well as bladders.

== Feeding ==
Hirudo verbana feeds on blood (hematophagy). During a blood meal, a leech rhythmically contracts its muscles to draw blood from a host animal into the crop for storage. It can consume over five times its own weight in blood in one feeding. Once satiated, a leech detaches from its host. Hirudo verbana uses anticoagulants when it feeds, so its bite wounds continue bleeding for some time afterwards.

For a few hours after feeding, H. verbana becomes largely inactive. Within its crop, water and some osmolytes are removed from the consumed blood and excreted through a series of nephridia and bladders. As a result, the weight of blood is reduced by nearly half and the remaining erythrocytes (red blood cells) are concentrated.

This leech can go for up to six months in between blood meals. During this time, erythrocytes in the crop are slowly transported to the intestinum to be lysed so their nutrients can be absorbed.

Host animals include mammals, fish, water birds and amphibians. Amphibians such as tadpoles and juvenile hosts are important hosts for juvenile leeches, which cannot pierce mammalian skin for the first two feedings.

== Attachment ==
Like other leeches, H. verbana has anterior and posterior suckers that allow it to attach to a range of substrates in both air and water. It can even attach to porous, air-permeable substrates. In the wild, this ability may be relevant for attaching to porous rocks or the furry skin of host animals. The properties of leech suckers may be useful in design of biomimetic suction cups.

== Genome ==
Hirudo verbana has a haploid chromosome number of 13, contrasting with the 14 of H. medicinalis and the 12 of H. orientalis.

== Microbiome ==
The crop of H. verbana is dominated by two bacterial symbionts: an Aeromonas sp. and a Rikenella-like bacterium. Aeromonas has a low abundance prior to H. verbana's feeding, becomes three orders of magnitude more abundant after feeding and then gradually declines afterwards. The intestinum has a more diverse microbiome, containing (in addition to Aeromonas and Rikenella-like bacteria) Firmicutes, Fusobacteria, Morganella morganii and members of the α, γ, and δ Proteobacteria. These may benefit the leech by providing nutrients which are scarce in blood (e.g. B vitamins) or reducing colonisation of the gut by harmful bacteria.

The nephridia and bladders also have bacterial symbionts.

== Gallery ==
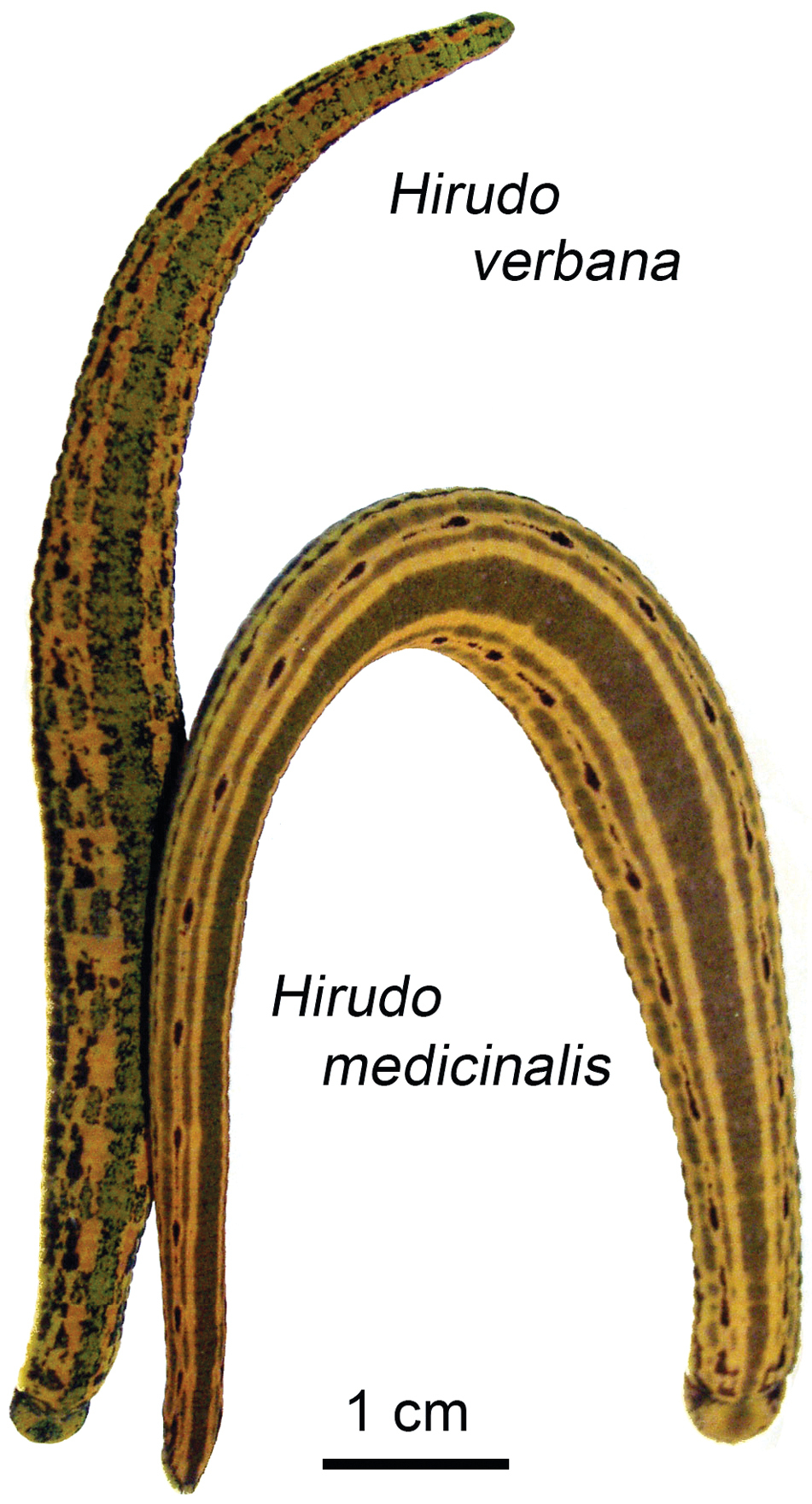
Comparison with H. medicinalis

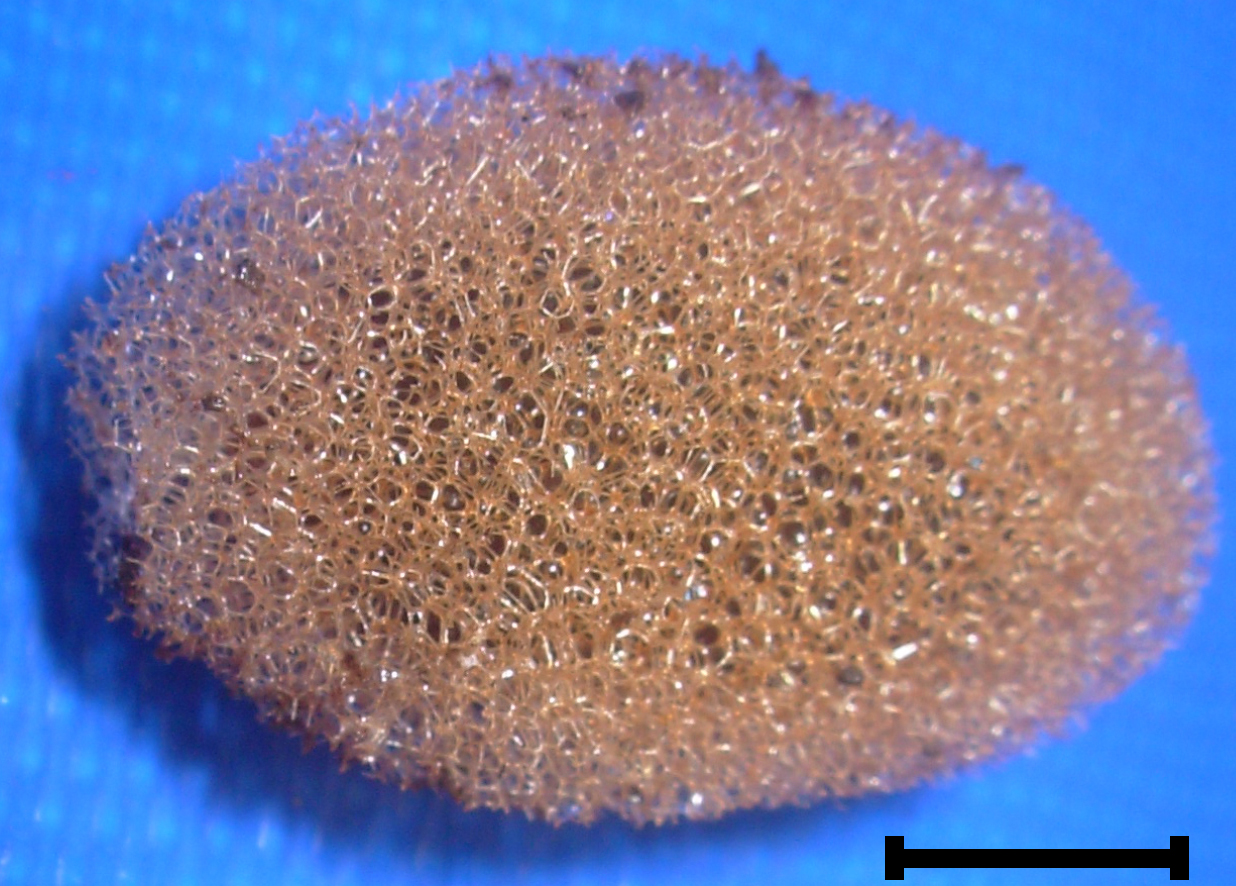
Cocoon
