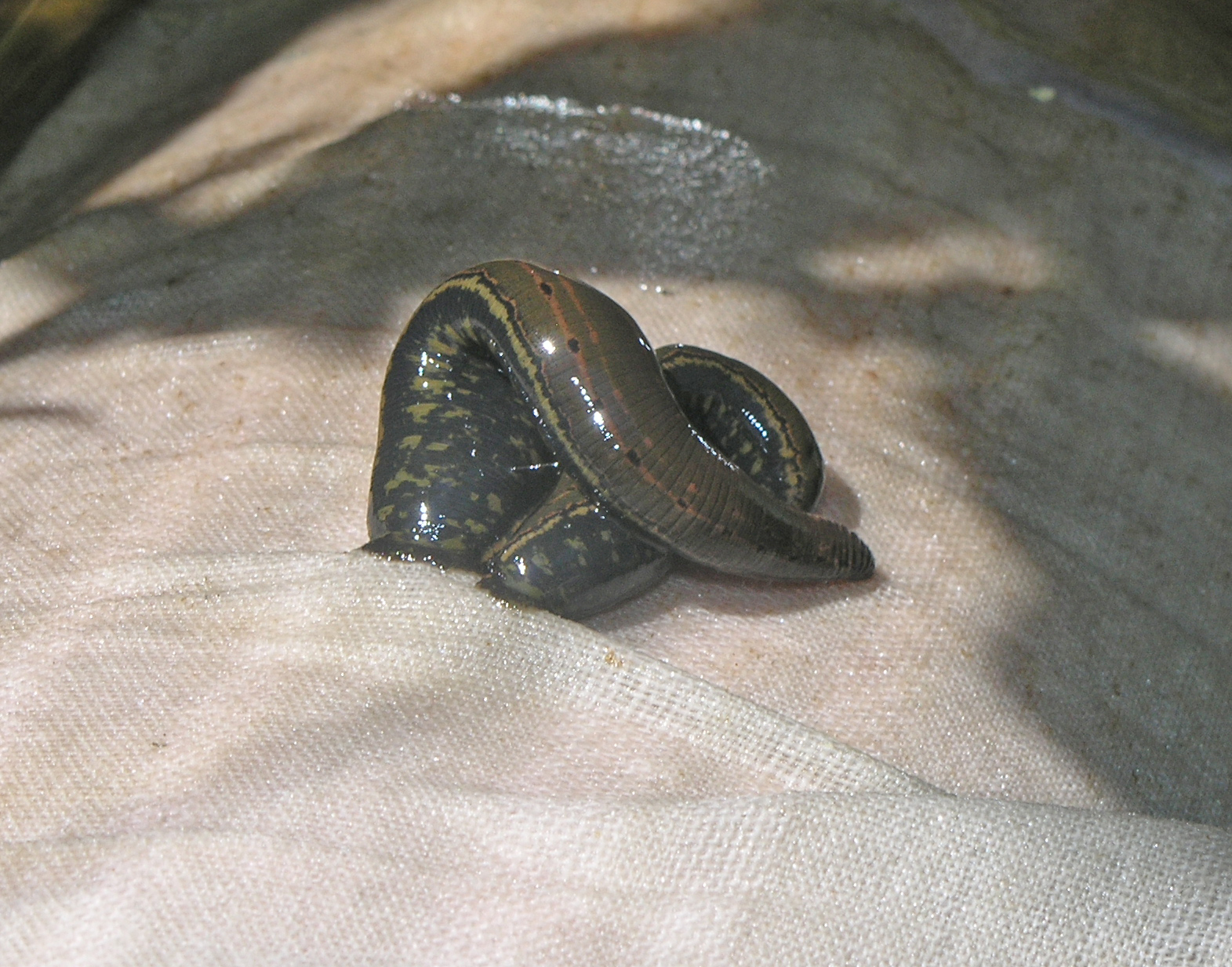

Scientific classification
- Kingdom: Animalia
- Phylum: Annelida
- Clade: Pleistoannelida
- Clade: Sedentaria
- Class: Clitellata
- Subclass: Hirudinea
- Order: Arhynchobdellida
- Family: Hirudinidae
- Genus: Hirudo
- Species: H. orientalis

Binomial name
- Hirudo orientalis Utevsky & Trontelj, 2005

= Hirudo orientalis =

Species of annelid worm

Hirudo orientalis is a species of medicinal leech. It has been confused with Hirudo medicinalis, but has recently been recognized as a different species. This Asian species is associated with mountainous areas in the subboreal eremias zone and occurs in Azerbaijan, Iran, Uzbekistan and Kazakhstan. It occurs also in Georgia, and probably in Armenia.

== Morphology ==
=== External characters ===
It has a length up to 108 mm (4.3 in), width of maximum body 10 mm (0.39 in), width of anterior sucker 4 mm (0.16 in), width of posterior sucker 5.5 mm (0.22 in). Gonopores are separated by five annuli. There are complete somite fiveannulate. Body surface is covered with numerous papillae. There are five eye pairs. The sulcus is present as a narrow and distinct groove running from the crypt of the median dorsal jaw to the dorsal rim of the anterior sucker. The dorsal surface color is mainly grass green, there are two orange paramedian stripes which are thin and fragmented and two orange paramarginal stripes which are broad and encompassing black segmentally arranged quadrangular or rounded spots. Lateral margins of body with yellow stripes encompassing black, segmentally arranged rounded spots. Black spots are located on the central annulus (a2) of each segment. Ventral region is mainly black, with metameric pairs of light greenish markings.

=== Internal characters ===
==== Jaws and teeth ====
This species has three jaws, as is typical for a medicinal leech, which are monostichodont and bearing papillae. The papillae do not have any pores or fissures. Each jaw has 80 (min: 71 – max: 91) teeth; each tooth's average size is 33 μm.

==== Male reproductive system ====
The atrium is large, bulbous with a glandular cover and located at ganglion in segment XI. The penis sheath is long broad duct bent anteriorly, not reaching ganglion in segment XII. Its epididymides are medium-sized, discoid, tightly packed masses of ducting standing upright on either side of the atrium and located between ganglia in segments XI and XII. Ejaculatory bulbs are fusiform, well-developed, and not larger than epididymides the dorsocefalic faces of which they circle. The vas deferens is thin ducts running from the epididymis posteriorly. Its testisacs is ovoid, approximately 1.5 times the size of ovisacs and located posterior to ganglion in segment XIII.

==== Female reproductive system ====
The vagina has an upright, long, evenly curved tube entering directly into ventral body wall posterior to ganglion in XII. A common oviduct enters the vagina subterminally at a small vaginal caecum. Its ovisacs are globular, small. A common oviduct has a thin duct forming several loops and covered with a thick layer of glandular tissue bound to the cephalic face of vagina. The entire female reproductive system located between ganglia XII and XIII.

== Reproduction properties ==
The mature individuals deposit average 2.53 cocoons within one month. Each cocoon has averagely 8.55 hatchlings. According to these figures, H. orientalis deposite more cocoon than H. medicinalis (1.65), but less than Hirudo verbana (3.29). Hatchlings number per cocoon is also medium compared to the previous species (H. medicinalis: 6.73, H. verbana: 10.45)
