= Philobdella =

Scientific classification
- Kingdom: Animalia
- Phylum: Annelida
- Clade: Pleistoannelida
- Clade: Sedentaria
- Class: Clitellata
- Subclass: Hirudinea
- Order: Arhynchobdellida
- Suborder: Hirudiniformes
- Family: Macrobdellidae
- Genus: Philobdella; Verrill, 1874

Genus of leeches

Philobdella is a genus of Nearctic leeches belonging to the family Macrobdellidae.

== Species ==
ITIS includes the following:

1. Philobdella floridana (Verrill, 1874)
2. Philobdella gracilis Moore, 1901
