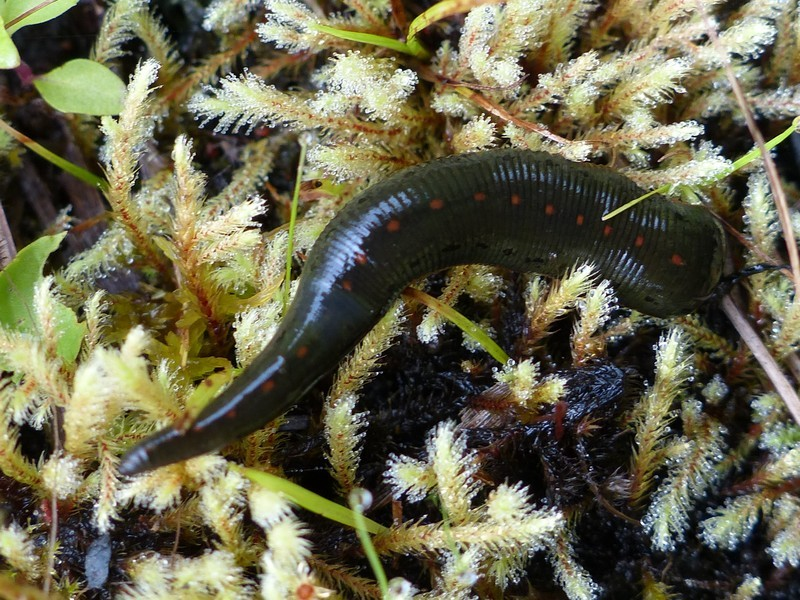
- Macrobdella decora, the North American medicinal leech, in Buckingham, Quebec

Scientific classification
- Kingdom: Animalia
- Phylum: Annelida
- Clade: Pleistoannelida
- Clade: Sedentaria
- Class: Clitellata
- Subclass: Hirudinea
- Order: Arhynchobdellida
- Suborder: Hirudiniformes
- Family: Macrobdellidae
- Genus: Macrobdella; Verrill, 1872

= Macrobdella =

Genus of leeches

Macrobdella is a genus of leeches native to freshwater ecosystems of North America, especially Canada, Mexico, and the United States. The genus is commonly referred to as North American medicinal leeches.

== Species ==
There are five recognized species of Macrobdella.

- Macrobdella decora (Say, 1824) (Note: A binomial authority in parentheses indicates that the species was originally described in a genus other than Macrobdella .)
- Macrobdella diplotertia Meyer, 1975
- Macrobdella ditetra Moore, 1953
- Macrobdella mimicus Phillips, Salas-Montiel, Kvist, Oceguera-Figueroa, 2019
- Macrobdella sestertia Whitman, 1886
