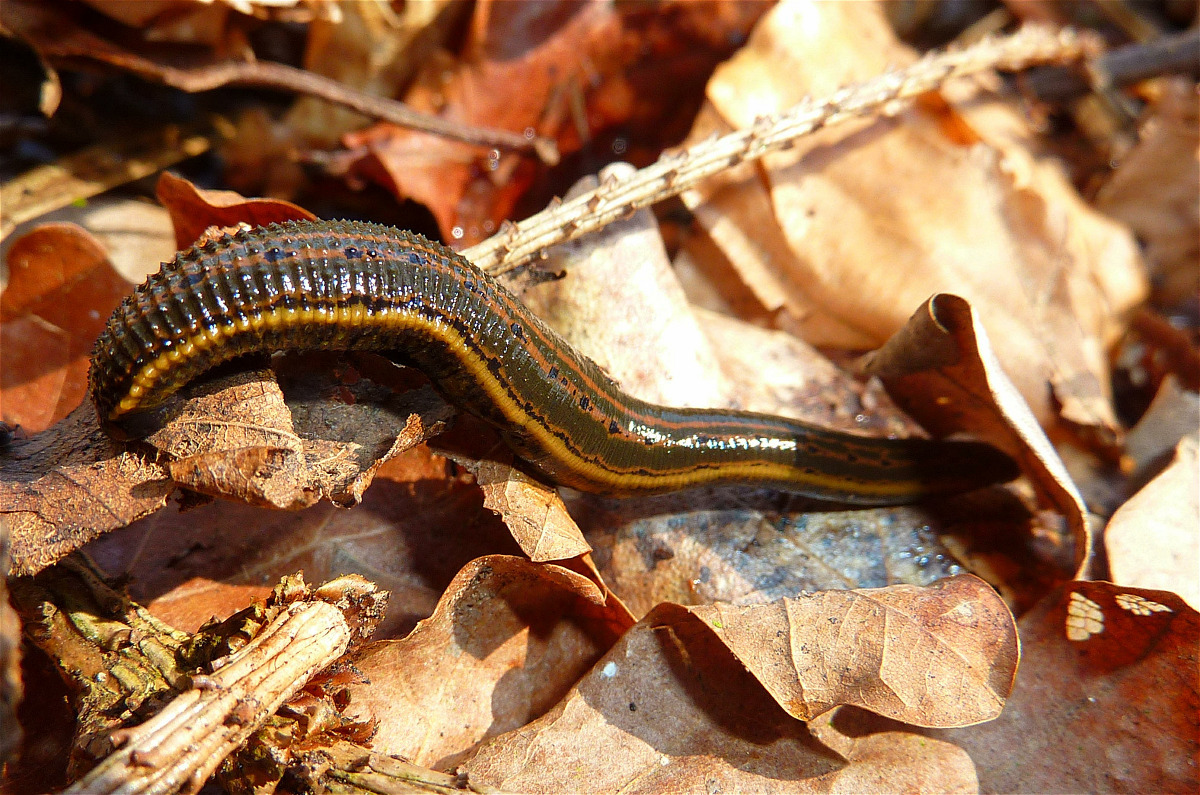
- Hirudo medicinalis

Scientific classification
- Kingdom: Animalia
- Phylum: Annelida
- Clade: Pleistoannelida
- Clade: Sedentaria
- Class: Clitellata
- Subclass: Hirudinea
- Order: Arhynchobdellida
- Family: Hirudinidae
- Genus: Hirudo; Linnaeus, 1758

Type species
- Hirudo medicinalis Linnaeus, 1758

= Hirudo =

Genus of annelids

Hirudo is a genus of leeches of the family Hirudinidae. It was described by Carl Linnaeus in his landmark 1758 10th edition of Systema Naturae.

The two well-accepted species within the genus are:

- Hirudo medicinalis Linnaeus, 1758
- Hirudo nipponia Whitman, 1886

Three other species, previously synonymized with H. medicinalis, were described in 2005 and are gaining acceptance:

- Hirudo verbana
- Hirudo orientalis
- Hirudo sulukii
- Hirudo troctina
- Hirudo tianjinensis

== Description ==
Species are typically exterior feeders. They have jaws that typically consist of about 60 teeth and do not possess papillae.

== Distribution ==
Hirudo medicinalis: Britain and southern Norway to the southern Urals, probably as far as the Altai Mountains (the deciduous arboreal zone)
Hirudo verbana: Switzerland and Italy to Turkey and Uzbekistan (the Mediterranean and sub-boreal steppe zone)
Hirudo orientalis: Transcaucasian countries, Iran, and Central Asia (mountainous areas in the sub-boreal eremial zone)
Hirudo sulukii: Kara Lake of Adiyaman, Sülüklü Lake of Gaziantep and Segirkan wetland of Batman in Turkey
Hirudo troctina: North-western Africa and Spain (Mediterranean zone)
Hirudo nipponia: East Asia, including Far East district in Russian, Japan, Korea, China, Mongolia, Ryukyu Islands and Taiwan
Hirudo tianjinensis: China

Hirudo verbana is further divided into nonoverlapping eastern and western phylogroups.

== Medical use ==
While H. medicinalis has long been used in hirudotherapy, and is approved by the US FDA as a prescription medical device, a 2007 study employing genetic analysis found that the species being marketed as H. medicinalis, possibly for decades, was the recently distinguished H. verbana.

== Conservation status ==
A 2010 study of data gathered four species proposed an IUCN status of near threatened for H. medicinalis, H. verbana, and H. orientalis, and a status of data deficient for H. troctina.
