= Anna J. Phillips =

American research zoologist

Anna J Phillips
- Education: CUNY Graduate Center Appalachian State University
- Scientific career
- Fields: Parasitology
- Workplaces: National Museum of Natural History University of Connecticut
- Thesis: A phylogenetic revision of the medicinal leeches of the world (Hirudinidae, Macrobdellidae, Praobdellidae) (2011)
- Author abbrev. (zoology): AJ Phillips, A Phillips

Anna J. Phillips is an American Research Zoologist and curator of Clitellata and Cestoda at the National Museum of Natural History's Department of Invertebrate Zoology. As a parasitologist her research focuses on leeches and tapeworms, by studying their diversity, relationships, and host associations. She has traveled all over the world with her fieldwork to study the diversity of these invertebrates on a long range.

== Biography ==
Phillips grew up in North Carolina spending much of her time outdoors. She and her family would go camping, hiking, and other outdoor activities. Each year they would visit the Great Smoky Mountains National Park. Out of all this she became interested in wildlife, even the smaller organisms that were not noticed by many. These experiences led to her research in invertebrate biology, focusing on parasitology.

She graduated with a BS in Biology with a concentration in ecology and evolutionary biology from Appalachian State University in 2006 with university honors. She received her PhD in Biology from the Graduate Center of the City University of New York in 2011. She then worked as a postdoctoral researcher at the University of Connecticut in the Department of Ecology and Evolutionary Biology. In 2013, she became a research zoologist and curator at the National Museum of Natural History in the Department of Invertebrate Zoology.

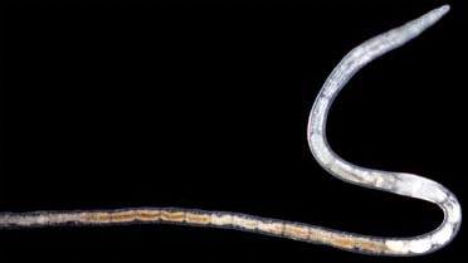
Picture of an undescribed species of Grania (Clitellata)

Phillips helped oversee the transfer of the United States National Parasite Collection to the Natural History Museum. About 20 million specimens were moved. They are now sorting through the specimens to organize and maintain the collections. Some of the collection are older and must be maintained in a different way now to keep them in good condition.

Phillips has traveled to six of the seven continents for her fieldwork. She collects specimens to describe new species and find out evolutionary connections of the worms, while also using morphological and molecular data. She also looks into host-parasite relationships to figure out how they changed their evolution. She has been focusing her host-parasite interactions research on non-marine bird tapeworms.

== Select publications ==
- AJ Phillips, ME Siddall. 2009. Poly-paraphyly of Hirudinidae: many lineages of medicinal leeches. BMC evolutionary biology 9 (1), page 246. https://bmcevolbiol.biomedcentral.com/articles/10.1186/1471-2148-9-246.
- AJ Phillips, R Arauco-Brown, A Oceguera-Figueroa, GP Gomez, M Beltrán, YT Lai, ME Siddall. 2010. Tyrannobdella rex n. gen. n. sp. and the evolutionary origins of mucosal leech infestations. PLoS One 5 (4), e10057. http://journals.plos.org/plosone/article?id=10.1371/journal.pone.0010057.
- A Oceguera-Figueroa, AJ Phillips, B Pacheco-Chaves, WK Reeves, ME Siddall. 2011. Phylogeny of macrophagous leeches (Hirudinea, Clitellata) based on molecular data and evaluation of the barcoding locus. Zoologica Scripta 40 (2), pages 194-203. https://onlinelibrary.wiley.com/doi/pdf/10.1111/j.1463-6409.2010.00465.x.
- ME Siddall, GS Min, FM Fontanella, AJ Phillips, SC Watson. 2011. Bacterial symbiont and salivary peptide evolution in the context of leech phylogeny. Parasitology 138, 1815-1827. https://www.researchgate.net/profile/Anna_Phillips7/publication/51467444_Bacterial_symbiont_and_salivary_peptide_evolution_in_the_context_of_leech_phylogeny/links/0046352b346d3b8b51000000/Bacterial-symbiont-and-salivary-peptide-evolution-in-the-context-of-leech-phylogeny.pdf.
- AJ Phillips, ME Siddall. 2005. Phylogeny of the new world medicinal leech family macrobdellidae (Oligochaeta: Hirudinida: Arhynchobdellida). Zoologica Scripta 34 (6), 559-564. https://onlinelibrary.wiley.com/doi/pdf/10.1111/j.1463-6409.2005.00210.x.
- ME Siddall, S Kvist, A Phillips, A Oceguera-Figuero. 2012. DNA barcoding of parasitic nematodes: is it kosher?. Journal of Parasitology 98 (3), pages 692-694. https://www.jstor.org/stable/pdf/41511264.pdf.
- CJ Carlson, KR Burgio, ER Dougherty, AJ Phillips, VM Bueno, CF Clements, G Castaldo, TA Dallas, CA Cizauskas, GS Cumming, J Doña, NC Harris, R Jovani, S Mironov, OC Muellerklein, HC Proctor, WM Getz. 2017. Parasite biodiversity faces extinction and redistribution in a changing climate. Science Advances 3 (9), e1602422. https://www.science.org/doi/pdf/10.1126/sciadv.1602422.
- CA Cizauskas, CJ Carlson, KR Burgio, CF Clements, ER Dougherty, NC Harris, AJ Phillips. 2017. Parasite vulnerability to climate change: an evidence-based functional trait approach. Royal Society open science 4 (1), 160535. http://rsos.royalsocietypublishing.org/content/4/1/160535.
- J Mariaux, VV Tkach, GP Vasileva, A Waeschenbach, I Beveridge, YD Dimitrova, V Haukisalmi, SE Greiman, DTJ Littlewood, AA Makarikov, AJ Phillips, T Razafiarisolo, V Widmer, BB Georgiev. 2017. Cyclophyllidea van Beneden in Braun, 1900. Planetary Biodiversity Inventory (2008–2017): Tapeworms from Vertebrate Bowels of the Earth pages 77–148. https://www.researchgate.net/profile/DTJ_Littlewood/publication/319136900_Cyclophyllidea_van_Beneden_in_Braun_1900/links/599426a60f7e9b98953ad5af/Cyclophyllidea-van-Beneden-in-Braun-1900.pdf.
- R Salas-Montiel, AJ Phillips, GPP De Leon, A Oceguera-Figueroa. 2014. Description of a new leech species of Helobdella (Clitellata: Glossiphoniidae) from Mexico with a review of Mexican congeners and a taxonomic key. Zootaxa 3900 (1), pages 77–94. https://www.researchgate.net/profile/Gerardo_Leon4/publication/270221927_Description_of_a_new_leech_species_of_Helobdella_Clitellata_Glossiphoniidae_from_Mexico_with_a_review_of_Mexican_congeners_and_a_taxonomic_key/links/54b005ef0cf2431d3531d18c.pdf.
