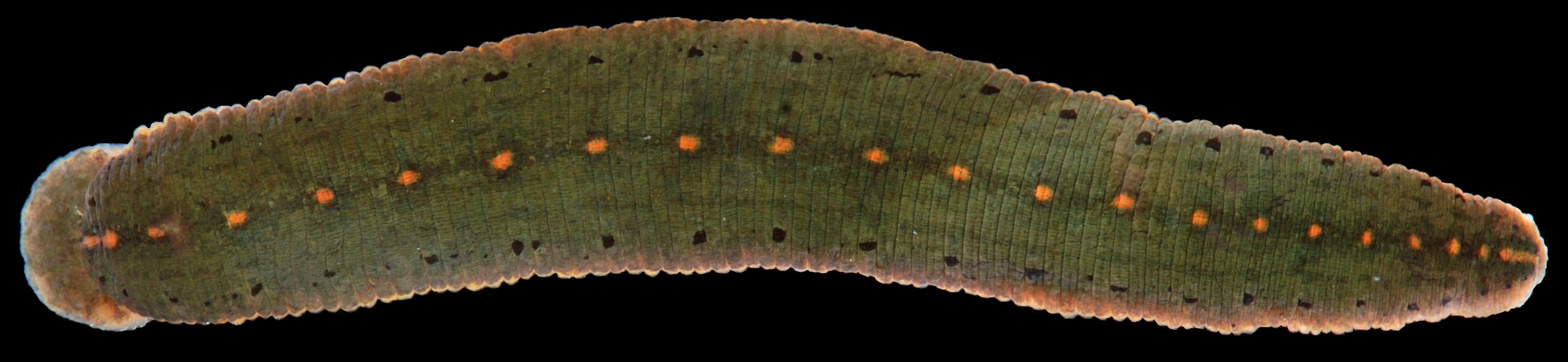
- Macrobdella mimicus

Scientific classification
- Kingdom: Animalia
- Phylum: Annelida
- Clade: Pleistoannelida
- Clade: Sedentaria
- Class: Clitellata
- Subclass: Hirudinea
- Order: Arhynchobdellida
- Suborder: Hirudiniformes
- Family: Macrobdellidae; Richardson, 1969

= Macrobdellidae =

Family of leeches

Macrobdellidae is a family of Nearctic leeches belonging to the order Arhynchobdellida.

== Genera ==
The family is accepted to include, since 2010:

1. Macrobdella Verrill, 1872
2. Oxyptychus Grube, 1850
3. Philobdella Verrill, 1874
