= C11orf16 =

Protein-coding gene in the species Homo sapiens

Identifiers
- Aliases: C11orf16, chromosome 11 open reading frame 16
- External IDs: MGI: 1928824; HomoloGene: 49631; GeneCards: C11orf16; OMA:C11orf16 - orthologs

Gene location (Human)
Chr.	Chromosome 11 (human)
Band	11p15.4	Start	8,920,076 bp
Band	11p15.4	End	8,933,006 bp

Gene location (Mouse)
Chr.	Chromosome 7 (mouse)
Band	7|7 E3	Start	109,311,388 bp
Band	7|7 E3	End	109,323,057 bp
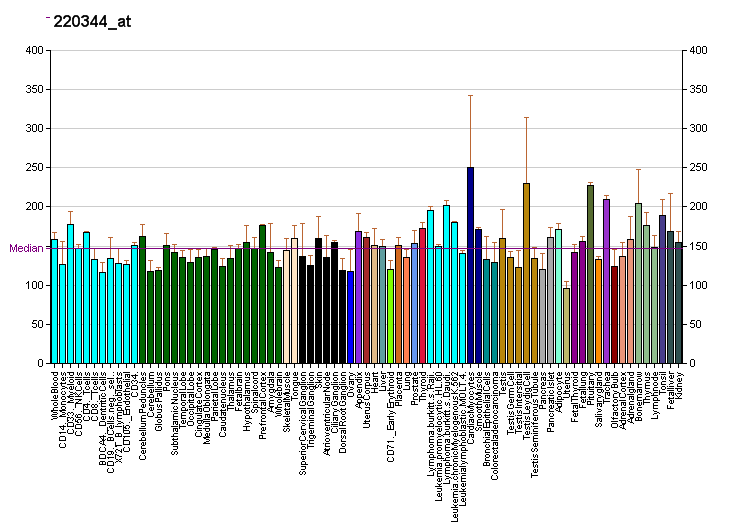
RNA expression pattern
Bgee	Human / Mouse (ortholog); Top expressed in: epithelium of bronchus; bronchial epithelial cell; right uterine tube; vena cava; nasal epithelium; trachea; cardia; olfactory zone of nasal mucosa; epithelium of nasopharynx; mucosa of paranasal sinus / Top expressed in: zygote; secondary oocyte; primary oocyte; urinary bladder; morula; lung; embryo; ovary; hypothalamus; blastocyst; More reference expression data
BioGPS	More reference expression data
Orthologs
Species	Human	Mouse
Entrez	56673	57355
Ensembl	ENSG00000176029	ENSMUSG00000031022
UniProt	Q9NQ32	Q9JJR6
RefSeq (mRNA)	NM_020643	NM_001040700; NM_020609
RefSeq (protein)	NP_065694	NP_001035790
Location (UCSC)	Chr 11: 8.92 – 8.93 Mb	Chr 7: 109.31 – 109.32 Mb
PubMed search
- Wikidata
View/Edit Human	View/Edit Mouse

Gene C11orf16, chromosome 11 open reading frame 16, is a protein in humans that is encoded by the C11orf16 gene. It has 7 exons, and the size of 467 amino acids.

== Gene ==
=== Location ===
The gene C11orf16 is located on chromosome 11(p15.4), starting at 8,920,076bp and ending at 8,933,006bp.

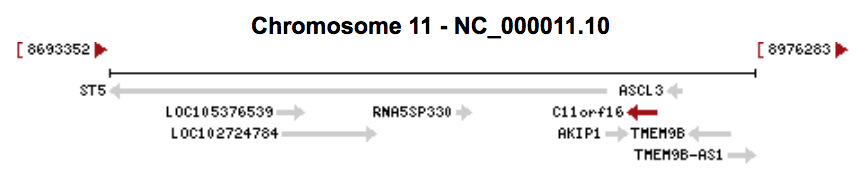

=== Gene neighborhood ===
Gene ASCL3 and AKIP1 are the neighbor genes of C11orf16 on chromosome 11.

=== Expression ===
==== Human ====
The gene does not have high expression throughout the body tissues. The percentile rank within the sample are higher in pancreas, ovary, and appendix.

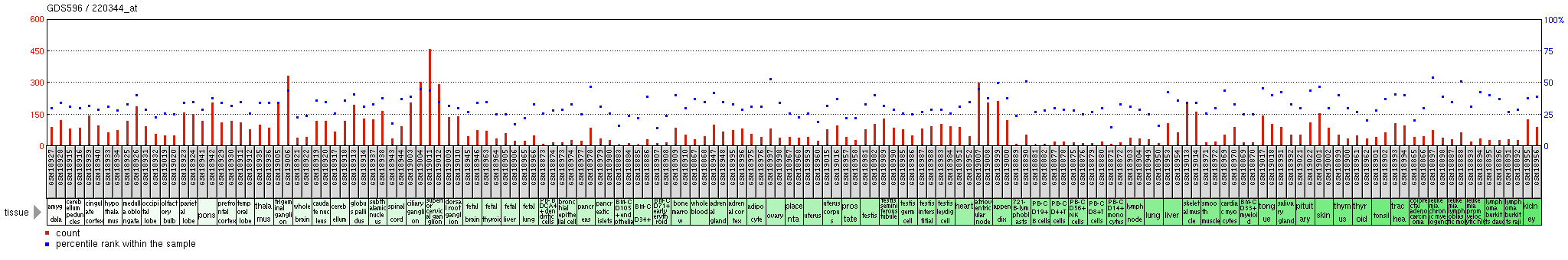
C11orf16 expression in human body sites extracted from NCBI GEO profile

==== Mouse brain ====
Even though the gene does not have a significant high expression in the mouse brain, it is most expressed in midbrain, isocortex, olfactory areas, and medulla.

=== Transcription factors ===
Some transcription factors that have the higher matrix similarity are Kruppel-like zinc finger protein 219, zinc finger protein 263, ZKSCAN12 (zinc finger protein with KRAB and SCAN domains 12), chorion-specific transcription factor GCMa, and Ras-responsive element binding protein 1.

== mRNA ==
=== Isoform ===
The predicted C11orf16 transcript variant X1 is 2386bp long and has NCBI accession number of XM_017018013.1.

== Homology ==
=== Paralogs ===
No paralogs were found for the C11orf16 gene through NCBI BLAST.

=== Orthologs ===
Description	Common name	NCBI accession ID	Query cover	E value	Identity	Date of divergence (MYA)
Homo sapiens	Human	NP_065694.2	100 %	0	100%	N/A
Pongo abelii	Sumatran orangutan	PNJ24628	84%	0	95%	15.2
Aotus nancymaae	Nancy Ma's night monkey	XP_012312127.1	88%	0	84%	42.6
Chinchilla lanigera	Long-tailed chinchilla	XP_013367496.1	97%	0	68%	88
Equus przewalskii	Przewalski's horse	XP_008512245.1	98%	0	73%	94
Cervus elaphus hippelaphus	Central European red deer	OWK17675.1	99%	0	67%	94
Hipposideros armiger	Great roundleaf bat	XP_019511755.1	99%	0	65%	94
Neomonachus schauinslandi	Hawaiian monk seal	XP_021541375.1	99%	0	66%	94
Lipotes vexillifer	Baiji	XP_007459933.1	98%	0	68%	94
Myotis brandtii	Brandt's bat	XP_005874017.1	98%	1e-174	67%	94
Chelonia mydas	Green sea turtle	XP_007057171.1	83%	1e-57	37%	320
Balearica regulorum gibbericeps	Grey crowned crane	XP_010311948.1	70%	6e-5	40%	320

=== Conservation ===
The gene C11orf16 is conserved in many animal species including mammals, avians, and reptiles.

The multiple sequence alignment shows the conservation of the gene C11orf16

== Protein ==
=== Molecular weight ===
The predicted molecular weight of the protein encoded by C11orf16 is 51 kilodaltons.

=== Domains and motifs ===
Several protein domains and motifs were found including CHD5-like protein, tyrosine kinase phosphorylation site, protein kinase C phosphorylation site, N-myristoylation site, casein kinase II phosphorylation site, and cGMP-dependent protein kinase phosphorylation site. The picture indicates the location of the motifs.

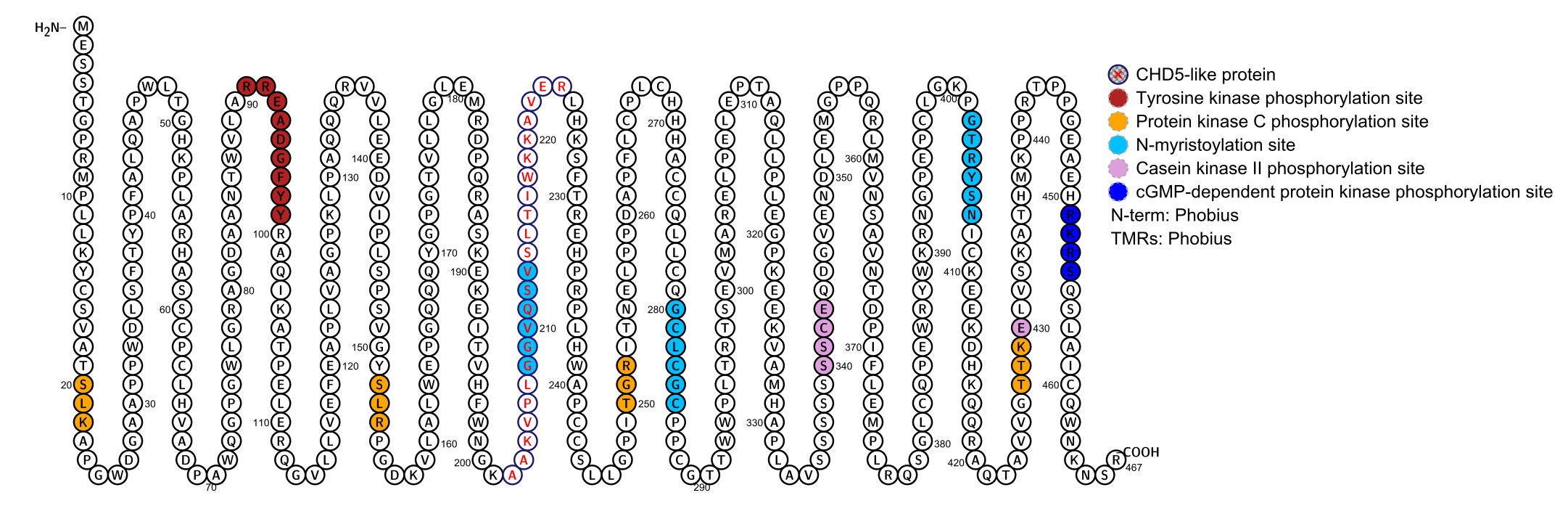
The predicted motifs of C11orf16 are shown in colors to the corresponding amino acids

=== Secondary structure ===
The protein is predicted to be made up with 21.2% of alpha helix, 15.2% of extended strand, and 63% of random coil.

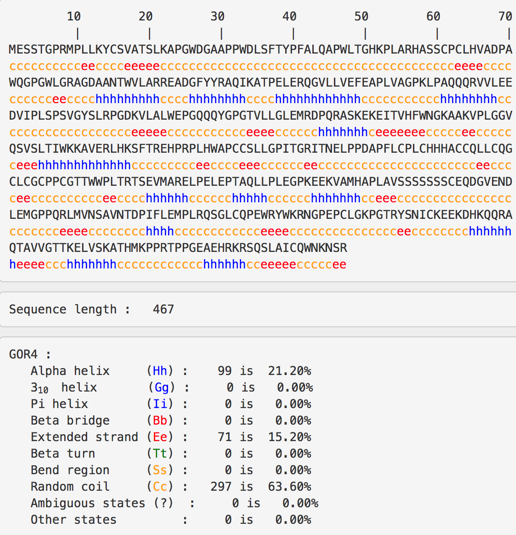
The secondary structure of protein C11orf16

=== Post-translational modifications ===
No transmembrane helices, potential GPI-modification sites, or TM-proteins were found. There were seven predicted sumoylation sites, multiple phosporylation sites with most of them being unspecified, and nine glycosylation sites.

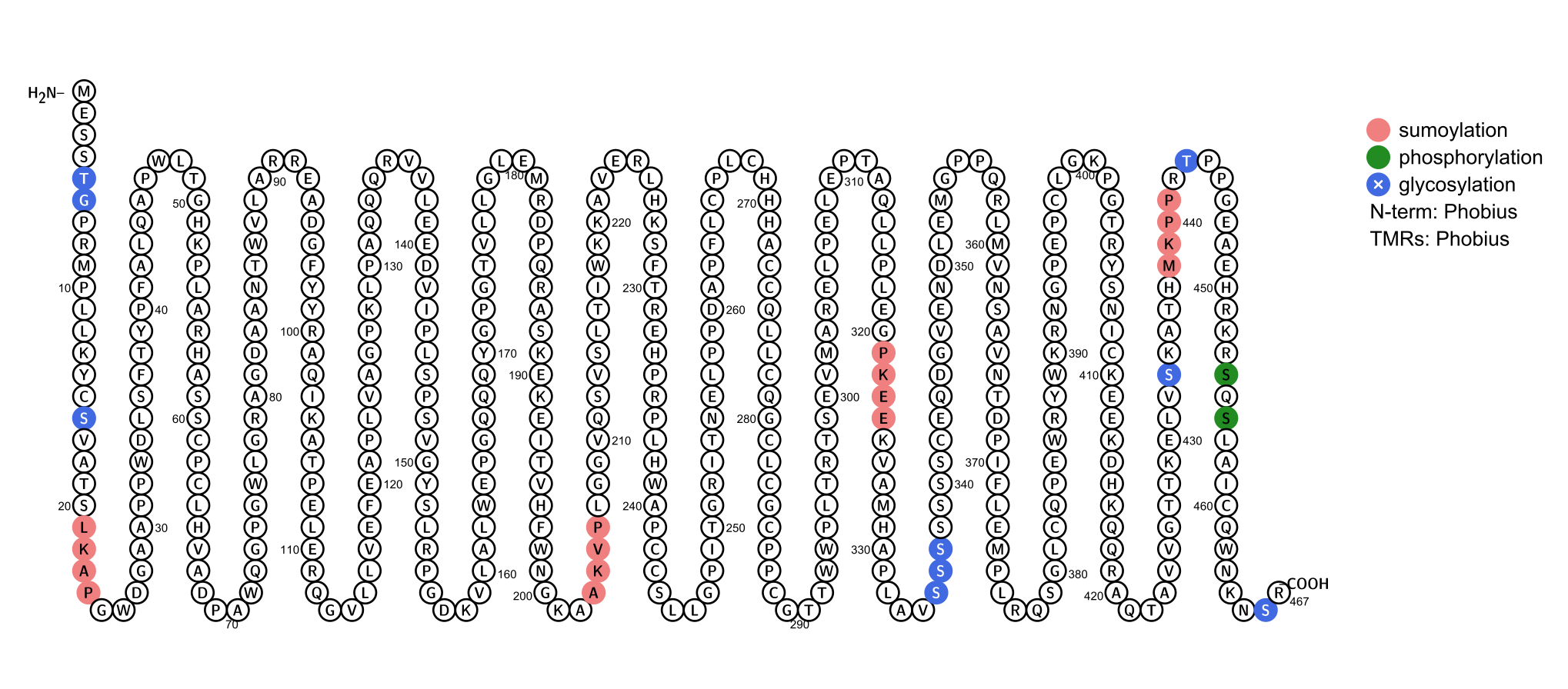
Post translational modification of protein C11orf16

=== Subcellular localization predictor ===
The protein is predicted to be localized to the nucleus with the probability of 47.8%; mitochondria with the probability of 26.1%.

=== Protein interaction ===
Proteins C1orf105 (Chromosome 1 open reading frame 105), PWWP2A, and SMYD1(SET and MYND domain containing 1) were found to be interacting with C11orf16.

== Clinical significance ==
=== Disease association ===
Protein coded by C11orf16 gene is also predicted to have 19.61% sequence identity to tumor suppressor p53-binding protein suggesting that this gene might be involved with tumor suppressing process.
