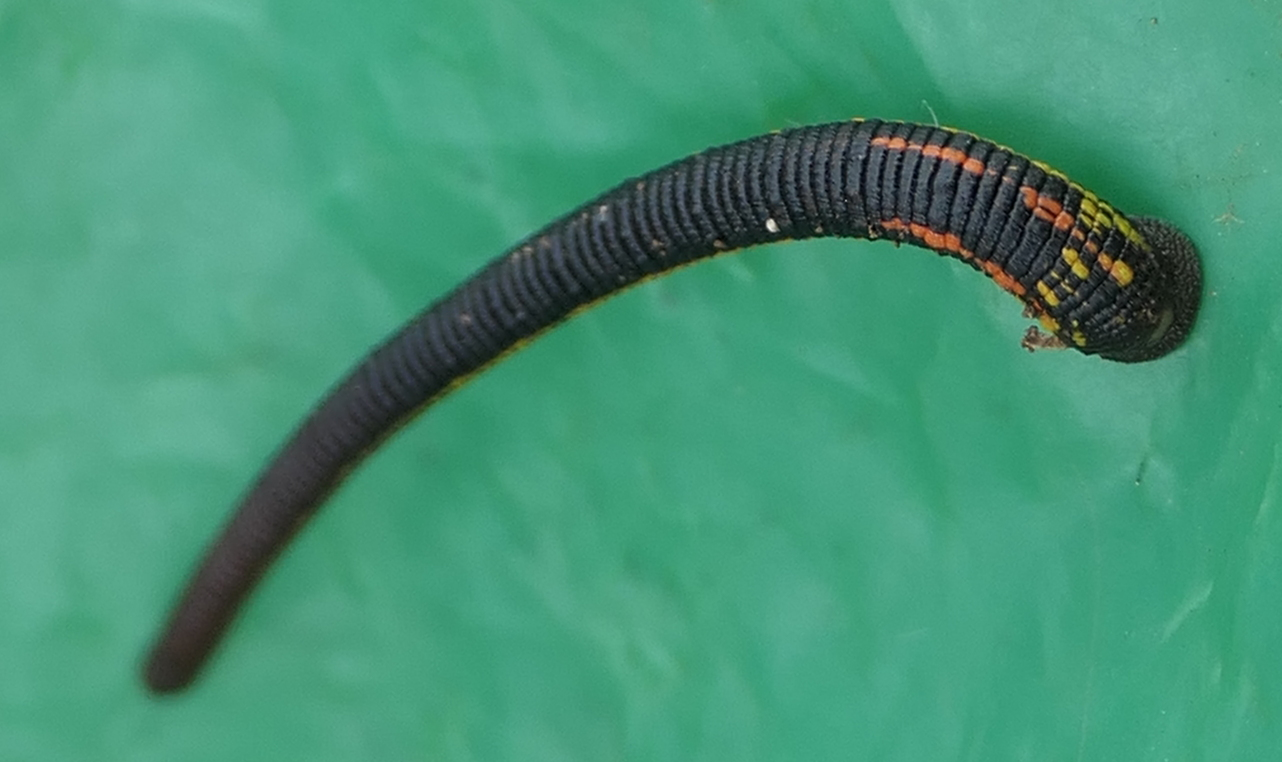
- A specimen in Budderoo National Park, New South Wales.

Scientific classification
- Kingdom: Animalia
- Phylum: Annelida
- Clade: Pleistoannelida
- Clade: Sedentaria
- Class: Clitellata
- Subclass: Hirudinea
- Order: Arhynchobdellida
- Family: Haemadipsidae
- Genus: Chtonobdella
- Species: C. limbata

Binomial name
- Chtonobdella limbata (Grube, 1866)

Synonyms
- Hirudo limbata Grube, 1866; Haemadipsa limbata (Grube, 1866); Geobdella limbata Whitman, 1886

= Chtonobdella limbata =

Species of annelid worm

Chtonobdella limbata is a species of terrestrial blood-sucking leech, commonly found in subtropical forests of Australia. Contracted, the leeches are about 28 millimetres (1.1 in) long, but once extended they can reach 60 millimetres (2.4 in) or even 80 mm (3.1 in) in length. They have two saw-like jaws which they use to cut open their victims' skin. In colour, they are mostly dark, with some coloured stripes. Their rear suckers are oval-shaped and have a prehensile protuberance on their tips. The first stage of their feeding has been studied in detail, and shows some differences with other leeches.

C. limbata is found along the east coast of Australia, especially in the state of New South Wales. It has adapted to withstand drought-like conditions by anhydrobiosis; they burrow into the ground and enter an inanimate state that resists dehydration. In this state they can survive for several months. They are exclusively ground-dwellers, and never enter water or climb onto forest vegetation.

== Classification ==
Chtonobdella limbata is the type species of the genus Chtonobdella and is classified in the family Haemadipsidae. Adolph Eduard Grube published the first description of the species in 1866 somewhat ambiguously under the name Hirudo limbata but with "the suggestion of Chtonobdella as a new genus". Confusingly, Grube later referred to the species again as H. limbata_{,} a name kept by some other scholars. The genus name Chtonobdella means 'land leech' and the specific term limbata is from the feminine form of the Latin adjective meaning 'edged' or 'bordered'.

== Description ==
As with other members of the genus Chtonobdella, this species has two jaws, which in most leeches act like cutting saws against their victim's skin, opening a wound. However, a 1968 investigation of C. limbata's feeding biology showed the jaws "sinking smoothly" into the experimenter's skin, but without any visible sawing movement (see § Feeding behaviour).

. Most leeches have three jaws, leaving a Y-shaped cut, but duognathous (two-jawed) species leave V-shaped cuts.

When contracted, the leeches are about 25 to 30 millimetres (0.98 to 1.18 in) long, but their extended length reaches from 50 to 60 millimetres (2.0 to 2.4 in), and in a few cases as long as 85 millimetres (3.3 in). Meeting notes record Grube's original specimens as being 1 and 1.5 inches (25 and 38 mm) long. The body of C. limbata is widest at the back. The leeches have five pairs of conspicuous eyes laid out in the shape of an arch. In colour, the leeches are dark green with a yellowish stripe down the middle of their backs, with another stripe on each side. Their undersides are ruddy and covered with splotches and streaks of blackness.

The leech's rear sucker is elliptical, longer than it is wide, and has 64 rays. Such rays help increase the suction provided by the sucker, and are present in all haemadipsids. The sucker's rearmost tip is slightly pointed and is adorned with a small, somewhat hook-shaped, and prehensile protuberance. Haemadipsids have another adaptation that helps increase their rear sucker's suction: liquids excreted from the nephridiopore are guided onto the sucker's surface, which maintains moisture and suction power.

In 1944, John Percy Moore, working from a single "poorly preserved" specimen from Dorrigo, New South Wales held in the British Museum, provided a detailed description of the species' morphology. All leeches have 32 segments, but they are all also covered with external rings called annuli; the gonopores of C. limbata are separated by nine and a half such rings, with the male pores on the sixth segment and the female ones on the thirteenth. Different segments have different annulation. The first four body segments have one annulus each; the fifth has two; and the sixth has three on the top but only two on the bottom. The next segment, the seventh, has three annuli all the way around; and eighth has four annuli. Segments nine to twenty-two are 5-annulate. In segment twenty-three, the number of annulations descends to four. The twenty-fourth is simpler with only two annuli, while the remaining eight segments – number twenty-five to thirty-two – have only one. Annulation was formerly widely used to identify species, but is used less today as the apparent number of annuli can vary.

Diagram showing the annulation of C. limbata.

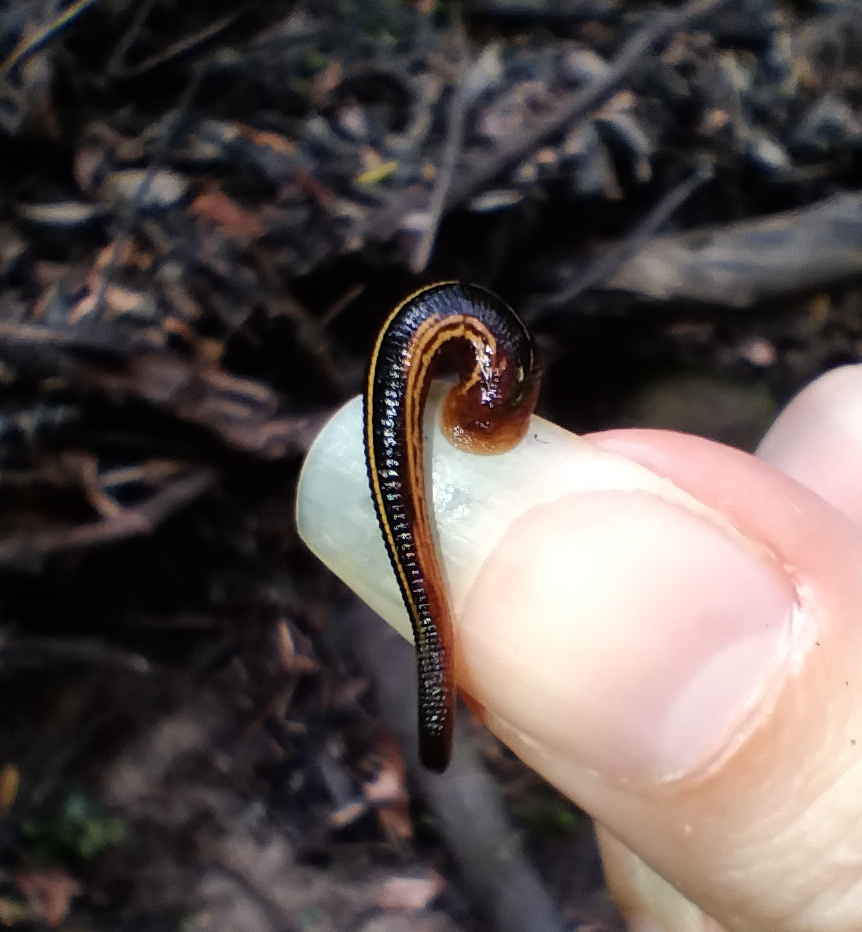
C. limbata on a human thumb.

== Ecology and behaviour ==
Chtonobdella limbata has been observed to parasitize Eopsaltria australis by attaching to the bird's leg. They are known to attack Muscicapinae as well, and are in turn parasitized by some trypanosomes. C. limbata is a parasite of humans and may attach to the legs of travellers in leech-infested areas.

=== Feeding behaviour ===
Laurence R. Richardson provided a detailed description of the initial part of the leech's feeding behaviour. In his experiment, Richardson let a leech "explore" his hand and then made a small scratch on his finger, producing a trickle of blood. The leech's mouth came near the bleeding and "did not hesitate to go near it". Once the leech's mouth actually found the blood, its sucker covered the cut and the leech became quite stiff. The sucker extended over the cut, and the leech sank its jaws into Richardson's skin without apparent sawing movement as has often been described for jawed leeches. Richardson admitted that the sawing may have occurred before he was able to observe the jaws, as the leech began its penetration. In either case, the site of the attack began to sting briefly after the leech secreted a clear substance around its sucker from its nephridiopores. Richardson pulled the leech up and the front sucker detached from the site of the wound, and noted that his level of bleeding and his blood clotting appeared normal. From this he deduced that in the first stage of parasitization that he had observed, the leech did produce histamine or hirudin. The bite healed quickly, but itched for some time afterwards, and inflammation around the bite began a week and a half later. Richardson put this down to the clear secretion he had noticed earlier.

After feeding on a host, an engorged leech burrows into the ground and lies there for some time. After a few days, the leech's activity slowly increases. Directly after a blood meal, the leech is considerably enlarged along much of its body length, and its movement is ungainly and slow.

=== Anhydrobiosis ===
In dry times, the leeches bury themselves into the soil, and can enter an inanimate state that resists dehydration, in which they can survive for months given no water in their environment. However, the leeches revitalize themselves immediately when water re-appears. This is considered an example of anhydrobiosis. In 1968, Laurence R. Richardson coined the term to describe the leech's behaviour, and he defined it as "a category of cryptobiosis based on environmental stress due solely to the lack of water". Upon making his discovery, Richardson performed an experiment he placed a leech, well-fed, in a large jar. The jar contained moss, damp soil, a small fern, and some leaves – but no further water or moisture was ever provided. Richardson's experiment started in the middle of January, and in May the leech's activity suddenly dropped off. It was not seen again. By July, the plants were dead. Richardson opened the jar at the end of October. He found the leech in the soil, very much contracted, firm, and rigid. He wrote that the jar was do dry that "the skin was so dry dust fell from it", and "the soil was powder dry." The leech did not respond to handling or to sunlight. Within ten minutes of being reintroduced to water, the leech was revitalized and began resuming its routine. Richardson noted that no other land leech could survive such dehydration. He also later experimented with over-watering the soil so it became muddy; the leech avoided the soil and clung to the side of the jar.

=== Habitat and distribution ===
Leeches are often thought of as aquatic creatures, but C. limbata, like all members of its genus, is terrestrial, and is common in the Australian subtropics. It prefers spots under canopies without underbrush that have been wettened by seepage. These spots usually have more stable moisture levels than the general forest floor, which the leeches do not inhabit. Being a terrestrial species, it does not enter water willingly and cannot swim, although they are able to survive underwater. They stay on the ground and do not usually climb onto vegetation.

Chtonobdella limbata is found in all three eastern Australian states. It is most reported in New South Wales, but is also found in Queensland and Victoria. In New South Wales it is found along the coast and into the Blue Mountains; in Queensland it is similarly found along the coast, and has been reported as far north as near the Daintree River. In the state of Victoria, records are fewer and restricted to the vicinity of the Strzelecki Ranges and western Gippsland.
