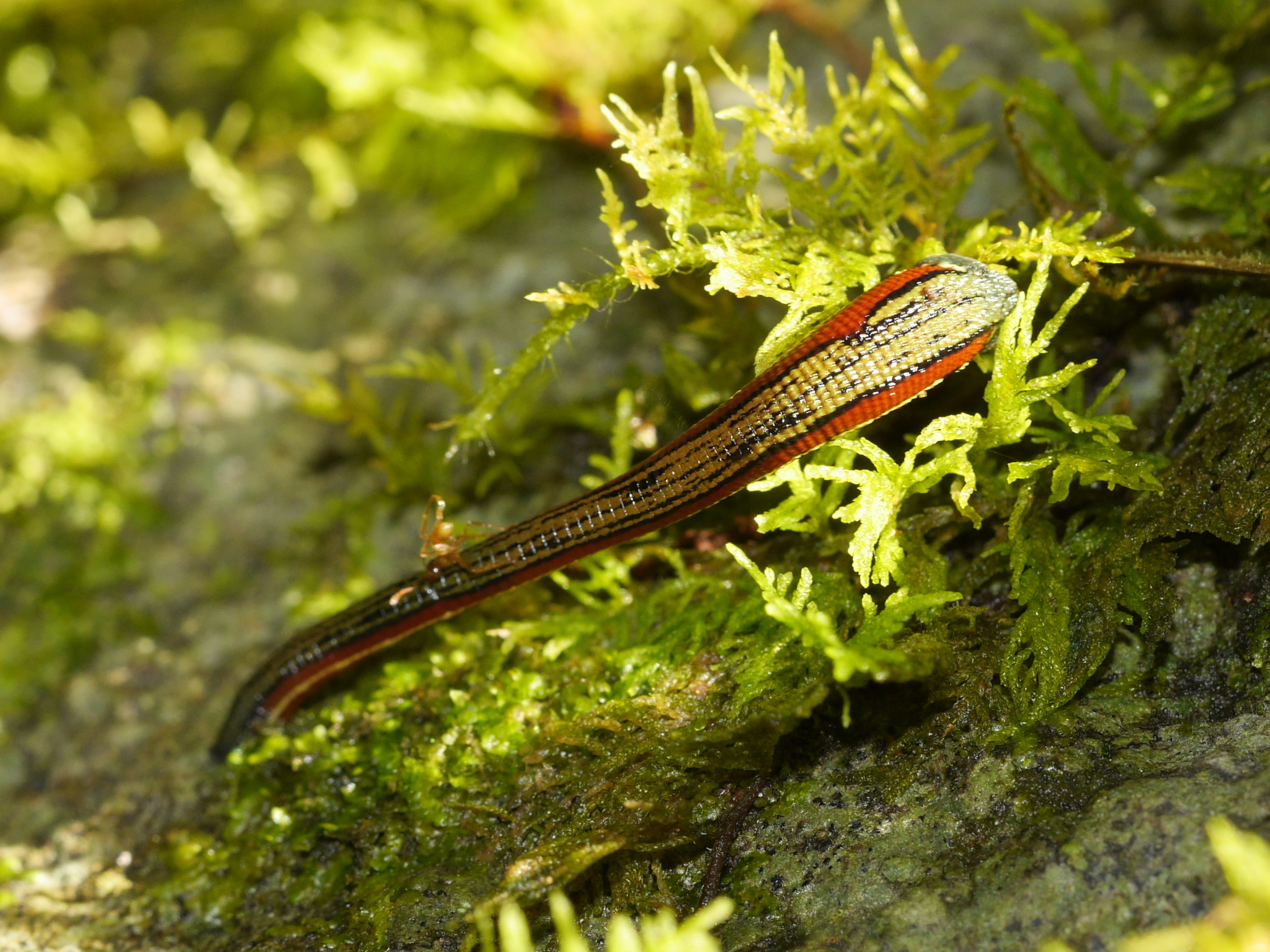
- Bukit Barisan Selatan National Park, Sumatra, Indonesia

Scientific classification
- Domain: Eukaryota
- Kingdom: Animalia
- Phylum: Annelida
- Clade: Pleistoannelida
- Clade: Sedentaria
- Class: Clitellata
- Subclass: Hirudinea
- Order: Arhynchobdellida
- Family: Haemadipsidae
- Genus: Haemadipsa
- Species: H. picta

Binomial name
- Haemadipsa picta Moore, 1929

= Haemadipsa picta =

Terrestrial leech from Asia known as the tiger leech

Haemadipsa picta (common names: tiger leech, or less commonly, stinging land leech) is a large (up to 33 mm long) terrestrial leech found in Borneo, Indochina, and Taiwan. It was described by John Percy Moore based on specimens collected from Sarawak, Borneo. It preys primarily on medium- to large-sized mammals, including humans.

== Ecology and behavior ==
Haemadipsa picta occur on bushes and grasses about 1 metre or higher above the ground in moist forests. They are fast and actively moving, and even known to fall onto hikers from higher bushes or leaves. They attach themselves to the hands, arms, shoulders, and even neck of passers-by. The bites of this species are comparatively painful and difficult to heal, hence the common name "stinging land leech."

== Description ==
Haemadipsa picta measure 13–33 mm (0.51–1.30 in) in length. The anterior sucker diameter is 1.3–2.5 mm (0.051–0.098 in) and the posterior one 2.5–3.7 mm (0.098–0.146 in). It is easily recognized by its longitudinally striped reddish brown dorsum: there is a broad, bluish-gray, yellow-greenish, or multicolored median-paramedian field that contains three to five black or dark brown broken stripes inside. There is also a white or pale yellowish longitudinal marginal stripe with dark-spotted borders. The venter is uniformly yellowish brown.
