= Chtonobdella fallax =

Scientific classification
- Kingdom: Animalia
- Phylum: Annelida
- Clade: Pleistoannelida
- Clade: Sedentaria
- Class: Clitellata
- Subclass: Hirudinea
- Order: Arhynchobdellida
- Family: Haemadipsidae
- Genus: Chtonobdella
- Species: C. fallax

Binomial name
- Chtonobdella fallax (Blanchard, 1917)

Synonyms
- Haemadipsa fallax Blanchard, 1917; Malagabdella fallax (Blanchard, 1917)

Species of leeches

Chtonobdella fallax is a species of leeches belonging to the family Haemadipsidae; also known by its synonym Malagabdella fallax (Blanchard, 1917) and having originally been placed in the related jawed land leech genus Haemadipsa by Raphaël Blanchard in 1917. It is a relatively common species in the tropical forests of Madagascar.

C. fallax is notable in that (before final identification) video evidence was provided by Mai Fahmy and Michael Tessler of this species gathering potential energy by rolling-up before springing off a leaf ("resembling a cobra retreating"). This resolved a long-standing debate about whether or not leeches could jump.
