= Philaemon grandis =

Scientific classification
- Domain: Eukaryota
- Kingdom: Animalia
- Phylum: Annelida
- Clade: Pleistoannelida
- Clade: Sedentaria
- Class: Clitellata
- Subclass: Hirudinea
- Order: Arhynchobdellida
- Family: Haemadipsidae
- Genus: Philaemon
- Species: P. grandis

Binomial name
- Philaemon grandis Ingram, 1957

Species of leech

Philaemon grandis is a species of Tasmanian leech in the family Haemadipsidae.

== Description ==
Philaemon grandis is a relatively large leech for its genus, exceeding 36 millimetres (1.4 in) in length. The leeches are a little over half a centimetre wide. They have a total of 80 annuli. They have stripes and a tesselated pattern.
