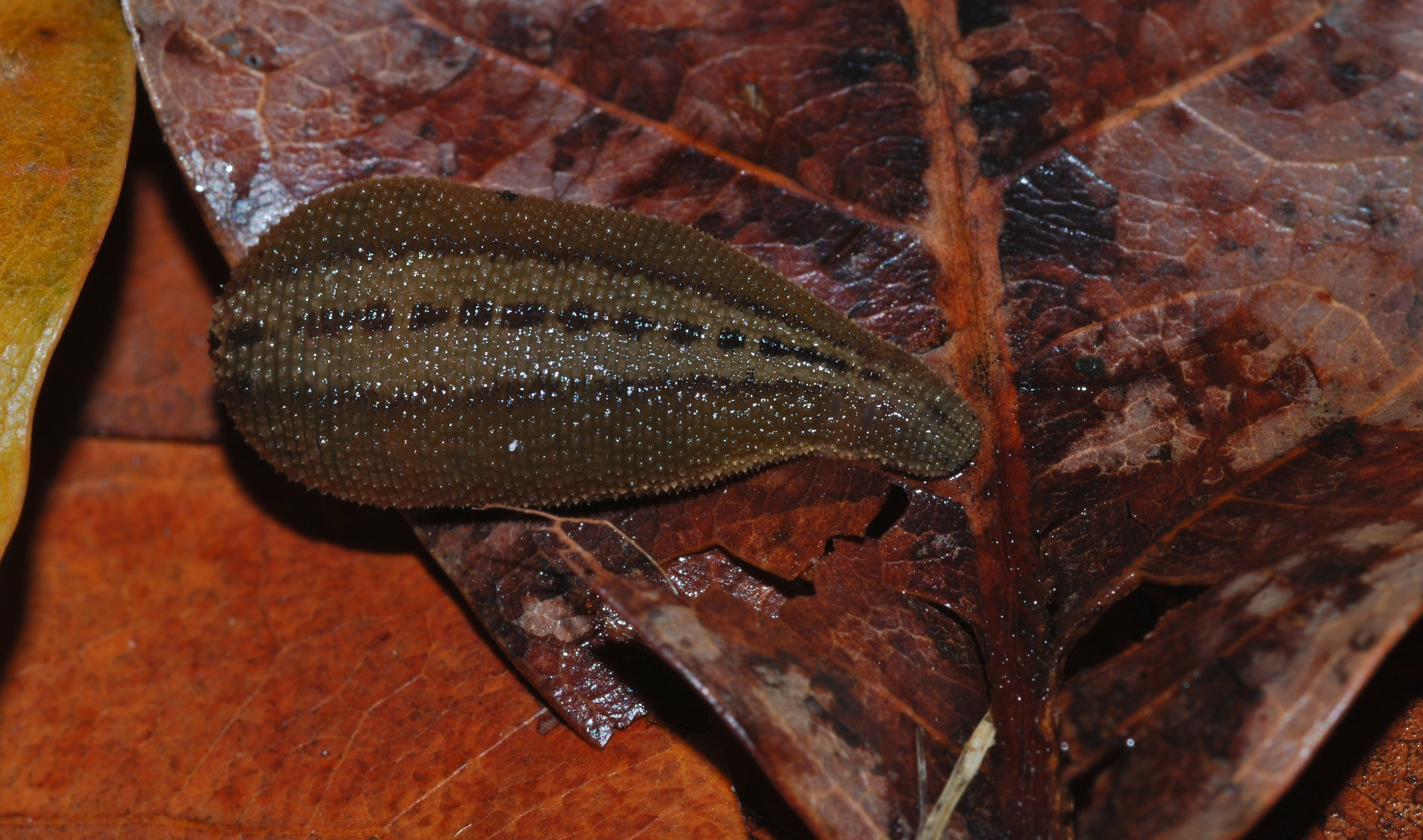
- Taman Negara, Malaysia

Scientific classification
- Kingdom: Animalia
- Phylum: Annelida
- Clade: Pleistoannelida
- Clade: Sedentaria
- Class: Clitellata
- Subclass: Hirudinea
- Order: Arhynchobdellida
- Family: Haemadipsidae
- Genus: Haemadipsa
- Species: H. interrupta

Binomial name
- Haemadipsa interrupta Moore, 1935

= Haemadipsa interrupta =

Malayan ground leech

Haemadipsa interrupta is a hematophagous terrestrial leech found in the Malay Peninsula. It was described by John Percy Moore.

== Ecology and behavior ==
Haemadipsa interrupta occur on the ground in moist forests. They are fast and aggressive, feeding on a variety of prey by attaching themselves to the feet of passers-by.

== Description ==
Haemadipsa interrupta are distinctive by having their median dorsal stripe being broken into a series of dashes.
