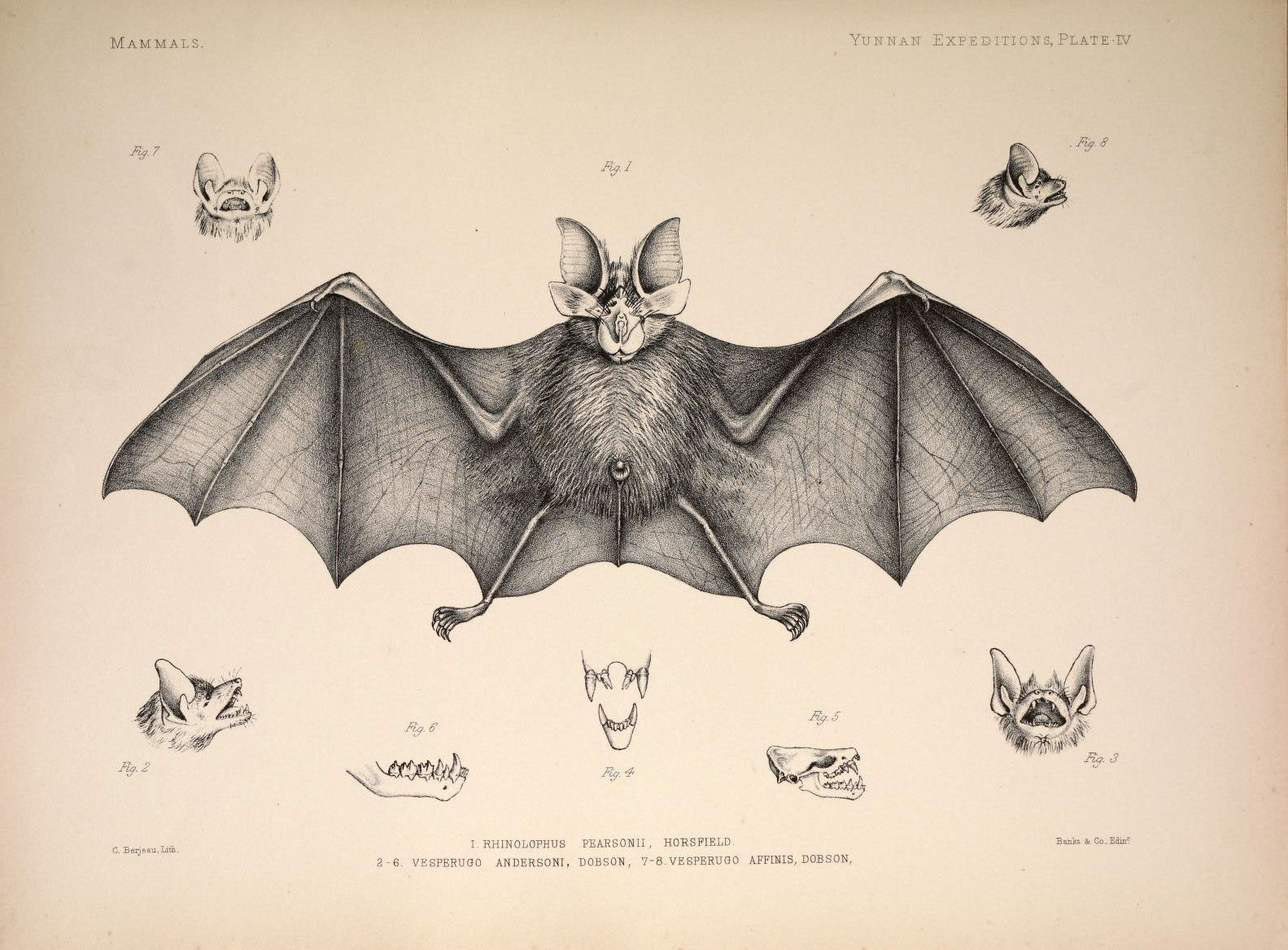

Conservation status
- Least Concern (IUCN 3.1)

Scientific classification
- Kingdom: Animalia
- Phylum: Chordata
- Class: Mammalia
- Order: Chiroptera
- Family: Rhinolophidae
- Genus: Rhinolophus
- Species: R. pearsonii

Binomial name
- Rhinolophus pearsonii Horsfield, 1851
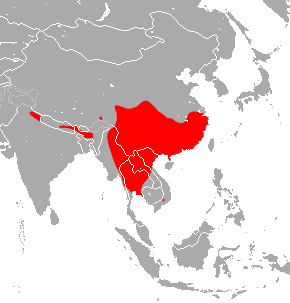
- Pearson's horseshoe bat range

= Pearson's horseshoe bat =

Species of bat

Pearson's horseshoe bat (Rhinolophus pearsonii) is a species of bat in the family Rhinolophidae. It is found in Bangladesh, Bhutan, China, India, Laos, Malaysia, Myanmar, Nepal, Thailand and Vietnam.

The species is named after John Thomas Pearson. Additionally it is a food source of the parasite Sinospelaeobdella, a jawed land leech.
