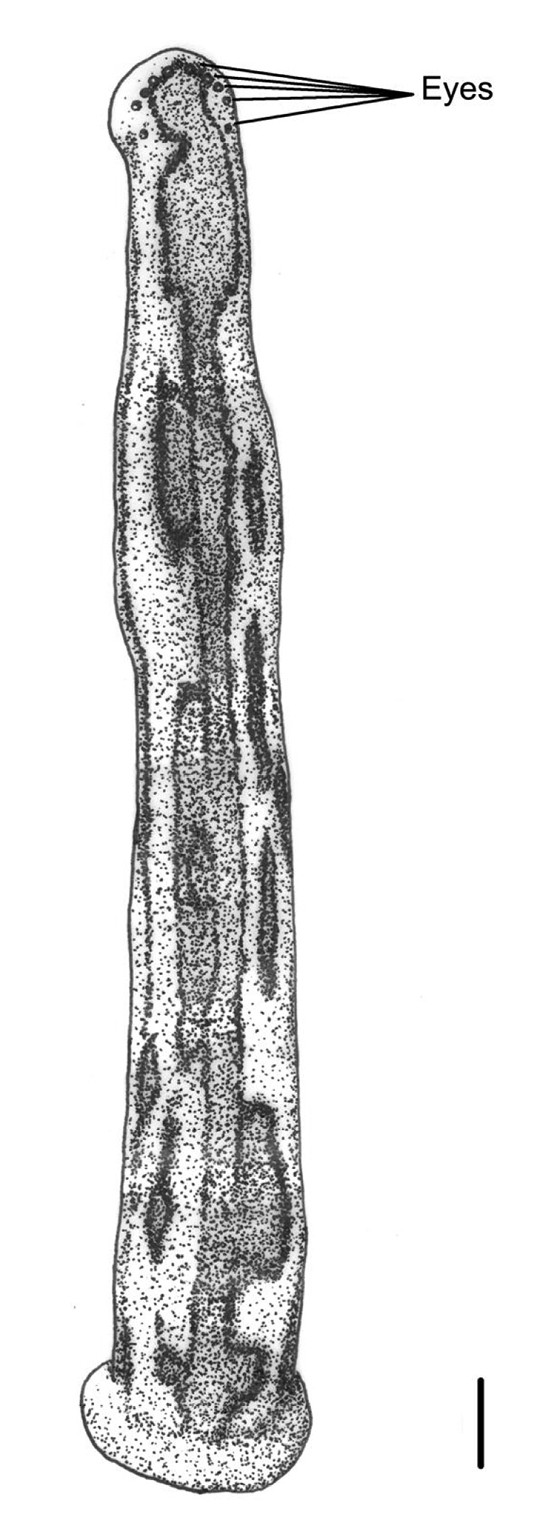
- T. taiwana

Scientific classification
- Kingdom: Animalia
- Phylum: Annelida
- Clade: Pleistoannelida
- Clade: Sedentaria
- Class: Clitellata
- Subclass: Hirudinea
- Order: Arhynchobdellida
- Family: Haemadipsidae
- Genus: Tritetrabdella; Moore, 1938

Type species
- T. scandens Moore, 1938

= Tritetrabdella =

Genus of land leeches in the family Haemadipsidae

Tritetrabdella is a genus of terrestrial hemataphagous leeches in the family Haemadipsidae. Unlike other haemadipsid leeches, Tritetrabdella species have four annuli on their mid-body segments. They have three jaws, with a total 45 teeth, and lack salivary papillae. Tritrabdella feeds primarily on amphibians and probably on small mammals as well, but to a lesser extent. Bornean species may be endangered due to amphibian population decline, disturbance and fragmentation of habitat, and climate fluctuations.

== Species ==
Five species are recognized:

- Tritetrabdella inobongensis Kappes, 2013
- Tritetrabdella kinabaluensis Kappes, 2013
- Tritetrabdella longiducta Nakano, Jeratthitikul, Nguyen & Panha, 2016
- Tritetrabdella scandens Moore, 1938
- Tritetrabdella taiwana (Oka, 1910)
