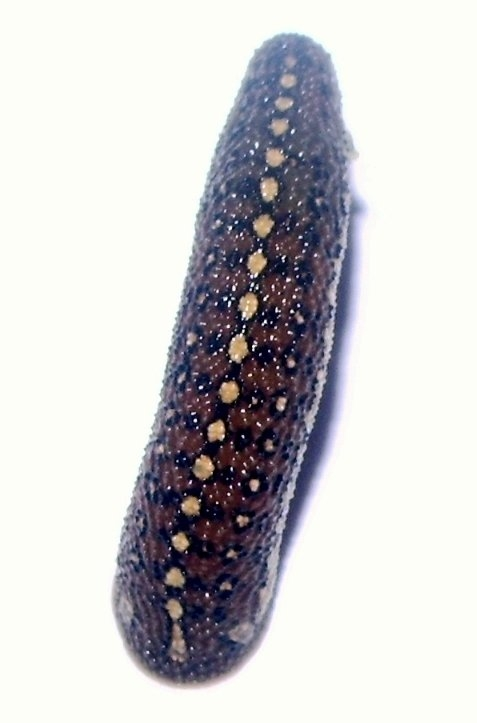
- Chain-striped leech

Scientific classification
- Kingdom: Animalia
- Phylum: Annelida
- Clade: Pleistoannelida
- Clade: Sedentaria
- Class: Clitellata
- Subclass: Hirudinea
- Order: Arhynchobdellida
- Family: Cylicobdellidae
- Genus: Phytobdella
- Species: P. catenifera

Binomial name
- Phytobdella catenifera J. P. Moore, 1942

= Phytobdella catenifera =

Species of land leech found in Malaysia

Phytobdella catenifera is a large (5-cm long) terrestrial leech found in Peninsular Malaysia. John Percy Moore chose this species’ epithet ‘catenifera’ after the striking chain-striped pattern on the creature's back (Latin catena = chain).

== Range and ecology ==
In 1935, the then curator of the Raffles Museum, Michael Tweedie, collected the type specimen among 23 of its kin on a brown tortoise Manouria emys. The type locality is Gunung Pulai in Johore and there is one record from Gabai Falls in Selangor. One of the reasons P. catenifera is seldom seen is that it is only attracted to reptiles and is of no threat to humans. However, one species of Phytobdella (P. lineata) from Papua New Guinea is thought to be zoonotic (i.e. it can transmit diseases to humans). Some texts on tropical medicine erroneously list P. catenifera among aquatic species occurring in sub-Saharan Africa. However, the genus Phytobdella is restricted to the Indo-Pacific Region, with P. catenifera being found only in Peninsular Malaysia and other species being found in the Philippines (P. meyeri), the Moluccas (P. moluccensis) and Papua New Guinea (P. lineata and P. maculosa). A possible sixth species, as yet unidentified, has been found in Laos.

== Taxonomy ==
Recent work on leech genetics and morphology suggests that the Indo-Pacific land leeches originated in Gondwana (a southern supercontinent that existed about 500 to 200 million years ago). Although findings on Phytobdella have yet to be published, the molecular analysis appears to support earlier studies that place all Asian land leeches in the family Haemadipsidae.
