= Tritetrabdella kinabaluensis =

Scientific classification
- Kingdom: Animalia
- Phylum: Annelida
- Clade: Pleistoannelida
- Clade: Sedentaria
- Class: Clitellata
- Subclass: Hirudinea
- Order: Arhynchobdellida
- Family: Haemadipsidae
- Genus: Tritetrabdella
- Species: T. kinabaluensis

Binomial name
- Tritetrabdella kinabaluensis Kappes, 2013

Species of leech

Tritetrabdella kinabaluensis is a species of terrestrial blood-feeding leech in the family Haemadipsidae. It has been observed exclusively from Sabah, Malaysia. The species is divided into two subspecies: Tritetrabdella kinabaluensis kinabaluensis and Tritetrabdella kinabaluensis inobongensis, the former being the typical subspecies. The species epithet derives from the sacred mountain Mount Kinabalu.

== Appearance ==
Tritetrabdella kinabaluensis has the following physical traits, regardless of subspecies:

- Fifty-five friction rays (Note: Textured rays on haemadipsid leeches' suckers to increase suction.) on the caudal sucker
- Creamy white to beige dorsum with brown stripes with dark outline.
- Female's gonopore in the posterior region of the seventh somite.
