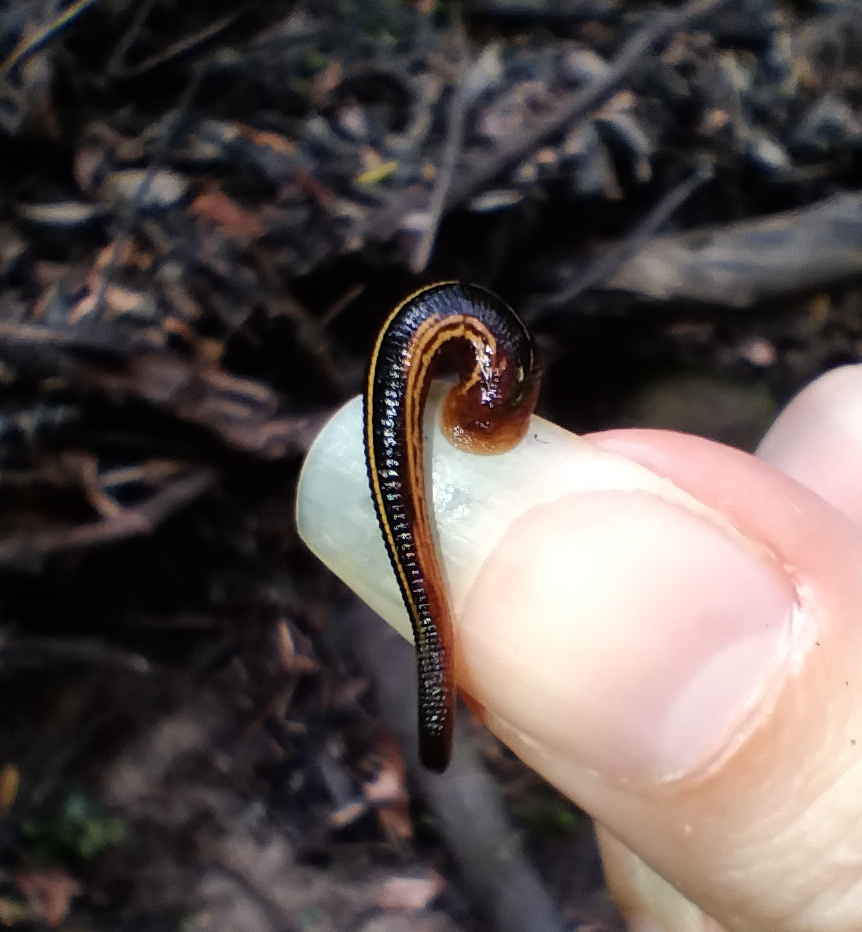
- Chtonobdella limbata

Scientific classification
- Kingdom: Animalia
- Phylum: Annelida
- Clade: Pleistoannelida
- Clade: Sedentaria
- Class: Clitellata
- Subclass: Hirudinea
- Order: Arhynchobdellida
- Family: Haemadipsidae
- Genus: Chtonobdella; Grube, 1866

Type species
- Hirudo limbata Grube, 1866

Synonyms
- Amicibdella Richardson, 1974; Anphilaemon Richardson, 1979; Chthnobdella Vaillant; Chthonobdella Blanchard, 1888; Geobdella Whitman, 1886; Micobdella Richardson, 1974; Moquinia Blanchard, 1888; Quaesitobdella Richardson, 1975

= Chtonobdella =

Genus of annelids

Chtonobdella is a genus of land leeches belonging to the family Haemadipsidae, erected by Adolph Grube in 1866. Species are mostly found in Australia and New Guinea, with isolated records from other Pacific islands and Madagascar.

== Taxonomy and description ==
The name Chtonobdella is derived from two Greek elements: chton, meaning 'ground' or 'land', and bdella, meaning 'leech': thus similar to other genera in the family Haemadipsidae, the jawed land leeches. In his original description of the type species, Adolph Grube used the name Hirudo limbata, but suggested the new genus name Chtonobdella. Confusingly, Grube later referred to the species again as H. limbata and other scholars retained the name; both this species and C. fallax, from Madagascar, have also been placed in the related genus Haemadipsa.

As with many other taxa, Tessler et al. (2016) noted that reliance on "externally visible characters, remains in conflict with phylogenetic relationships." They proposed that the genus Chtonobdella be revised to include "all duognathous leech species previously distributed in 31, mostly monotypic genera"; all species in the obsolete genus Geobdella were moved here. They used DNA sequencing and microcomputed tomography to establish monophyly in this genus and describe a new species C. tanae (the first description using this technology). Duognathous means having two jaws, opening a V-shaped wound on their victim's skin; other genera may have three jaws, making a Y-shaped cut.

== Species ==
As of April 2025, the Global Biodiversity Information Facility includes:

1. Chtonobdella australiensis (Lambert, 1899)
2. Chtonobdella bilineata (Richardson, 1975) - Australia
3. Chtonobdella fallax (Blanchard, 1917) - Madagascar
4. Chtonobdella limbata (Grube, 1876) - eastern Australia
5. Chtonobdella nigra (Richardson, 1974) - Australia
6. Chtonobdella tanae Tessler, Barrio, Borda, Rood-Goldman, Hill & Siddall, 2016 - eastern Australia
7. Chtonobdella whitmani (Lambert, 1899) – Australia and Pacific Islands
