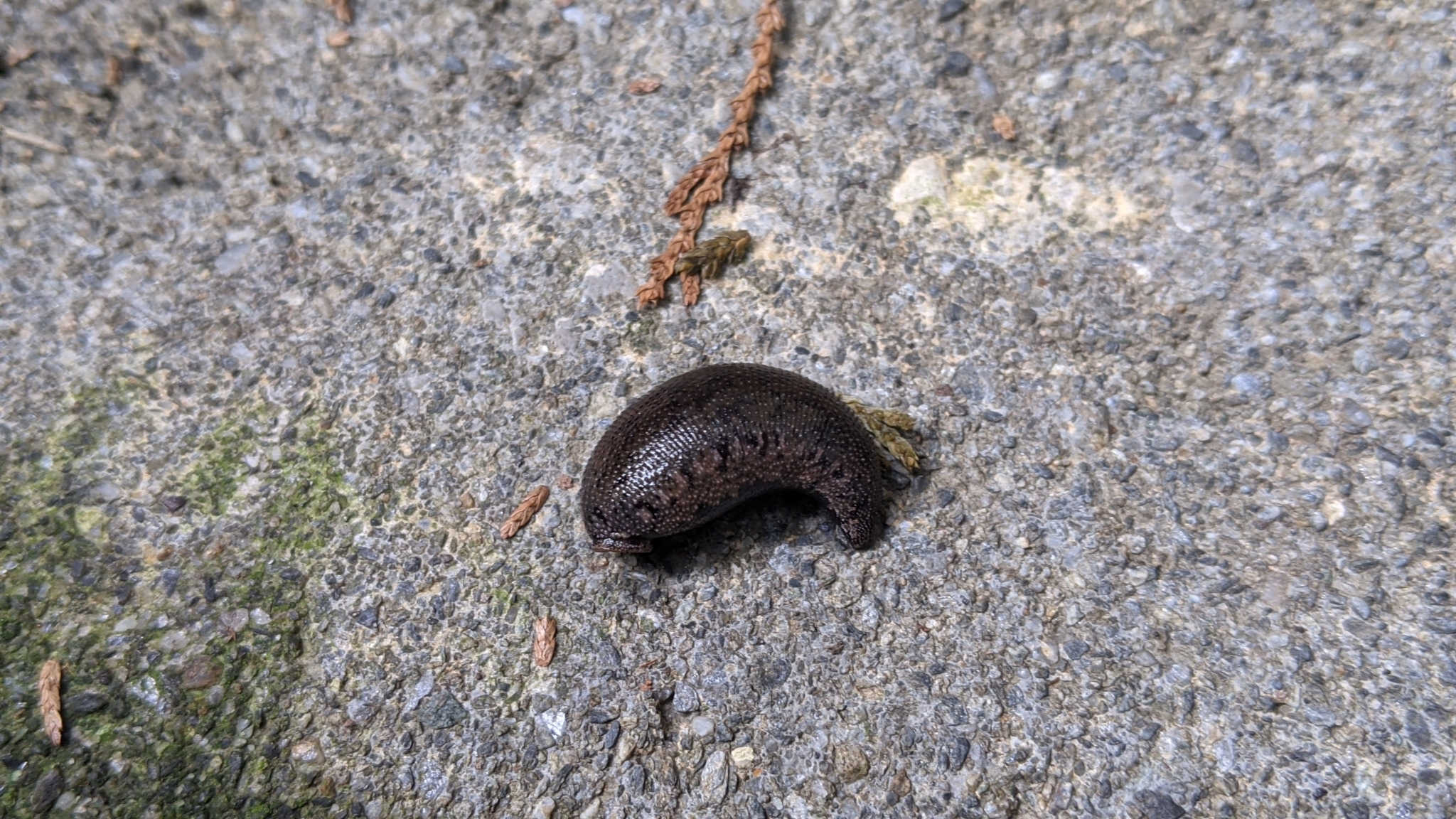

Scientific classification
- Domain: Eukaryota
- Kingdom: Animalia
- Phylum: Annelida
- Clade: Pleistoannelida
- Clade: Sedentaria
- Class: Clitellata
- Subclass: Hirudinea
- Order: Arhynchobdellida
- Family: Haemadipsidae
- Genus: Haemadipsa
- Species: H. rjukjuana

Binomial name
- Haemadipsa rjukjuana (Oka, 1910)

Synonyms
- Haemapdipsa japonica var. rjukjuana Oka, 1910

= Haemadipsa rjukjuana =

Terrestrial sanguivorous leech found in East Asia

Haemadipsa rjukjuana is a species of terrestrial blood-feeding leach in the family Haemadipsidae (order Arhynchobdellida). They are mostly found in Taiwan, although they have also been confirmed from Gageo Island in South Korea.

Several pathogens have been reported from the leech, specifically Anaplasma, Bartonella, Borrelia, Ehrlichia, Rickettsia, and Wolbachia. Haemadipsa rjukjuana was the first leech recorded to carry a Bartonella species.

A 2011 study found that the species is genetically distinct from Haemadipsa japonica.

== Physical description ==
Haemadipsa rjukjuana is distinctive for its colourations on its back, having black splotches over a reddish, yellowish, or greyish background. Another distinguishing feature of its colouration is its thoroughly black underside and the lack of a clear median stripe on its back.

H. rjukjuana typically grows between 14 and 37 mm long, with a width varying between 2.5 and 5.3 mm.
