= Haemadin =

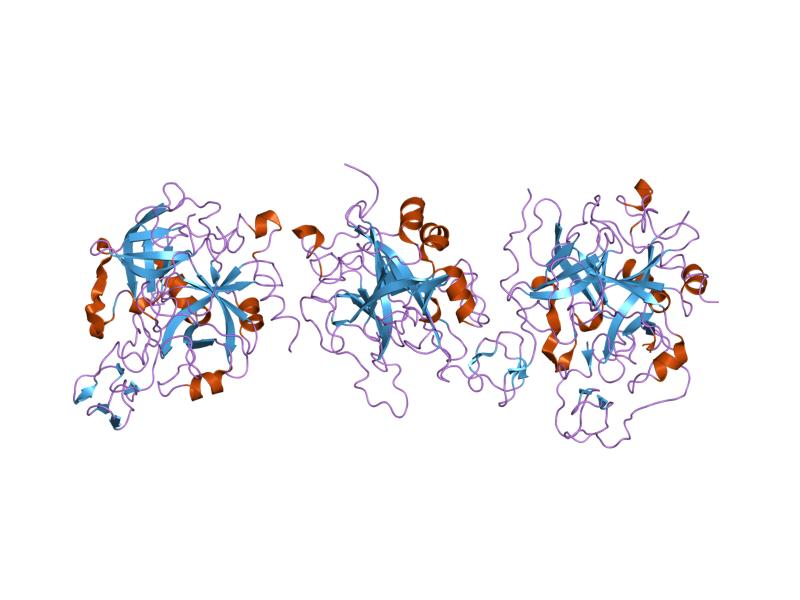
- crystal structure of the human alpha-thrombin-haemadin complex: an exosite ii-binding inhibitor

Identifiers
- Symbol: Haemadin
- Pfam: PF09065
- InterPro: IPR015150
- SCOP2: 1e0f / SCOPe / SUPFAM
Available protein structures:
- PDB: IPR015150 PF09065 (ECOD; PDBsum)
- AlphaFold: IPR015150; PF09065

In molecular biology, haemadin is an anticoagulant peptide synthesised by the Indian leech, Haemadipsa sylvestris. It adopts a secondary structure consisting of five short beta-strands (beta1-beta5), which are arranged in two antiparallel distorted sheets formed by strands beta1-beta4-beta5 and beta2-beta3 facing each other. This beta-sandwich is stabilised by six enclosed cysteines arranged in a [1-2, 3-5, 4-6] disulfide pairing resulting in a disulfide-rich hydrophobic core that is largely inaccessible to bulk solvent. The close proximity of disulfide bonds [3-5] and [4-6] organises haemadin into four distinct loops. The N-terminal segment of this domain binds to the active site of thrombin, inhibiting it.

Haemadin (MEROPS I14.002) belongs to a superfamily (MEROPS IM) of protease inhibitors that also includes hirudin (MEROPS I14.001) and antistasin (MEROPS I15).
