= Sinospelaeobdella =

Scientific classification
- Kingdom: Animalia
- Phylum: Annelida
- Clade: Pleistoannelida
- Clade: Sedentaria
- Class: Clitellata
- Subclass: Hirudinea
- Order: Arhynchobdellida
- Family: Haemadipsidae
- Genus: Sinospelaeobdella; Huang, 2019

Genus of leeches

Sinospelaeobdella is a genus of jawed land leech, endemic to caves in China.

The diet of this genus is unique among the land leeches, as it exclusively feeds off blood of cave dwelling bats. Its central diet is based on Rhinolophus sinicus, R. pearsonii, R. pusillus, R. macrotis, and Hipposideros armiger.

== Species ==
Sinospelaeobdella contains the species:

- Sinospelaeobdella cavatuses (Yang et al., 2009) (previously Haemadipsa cavatuses)
- Sinospelaeobdella wulingensis Huang, Liu, Gong, Wu, Liu, Deng, Zhang, Peng, Zhang & Liu, 2019 - type sp. - named after the Wuling Mountains where it was found.
