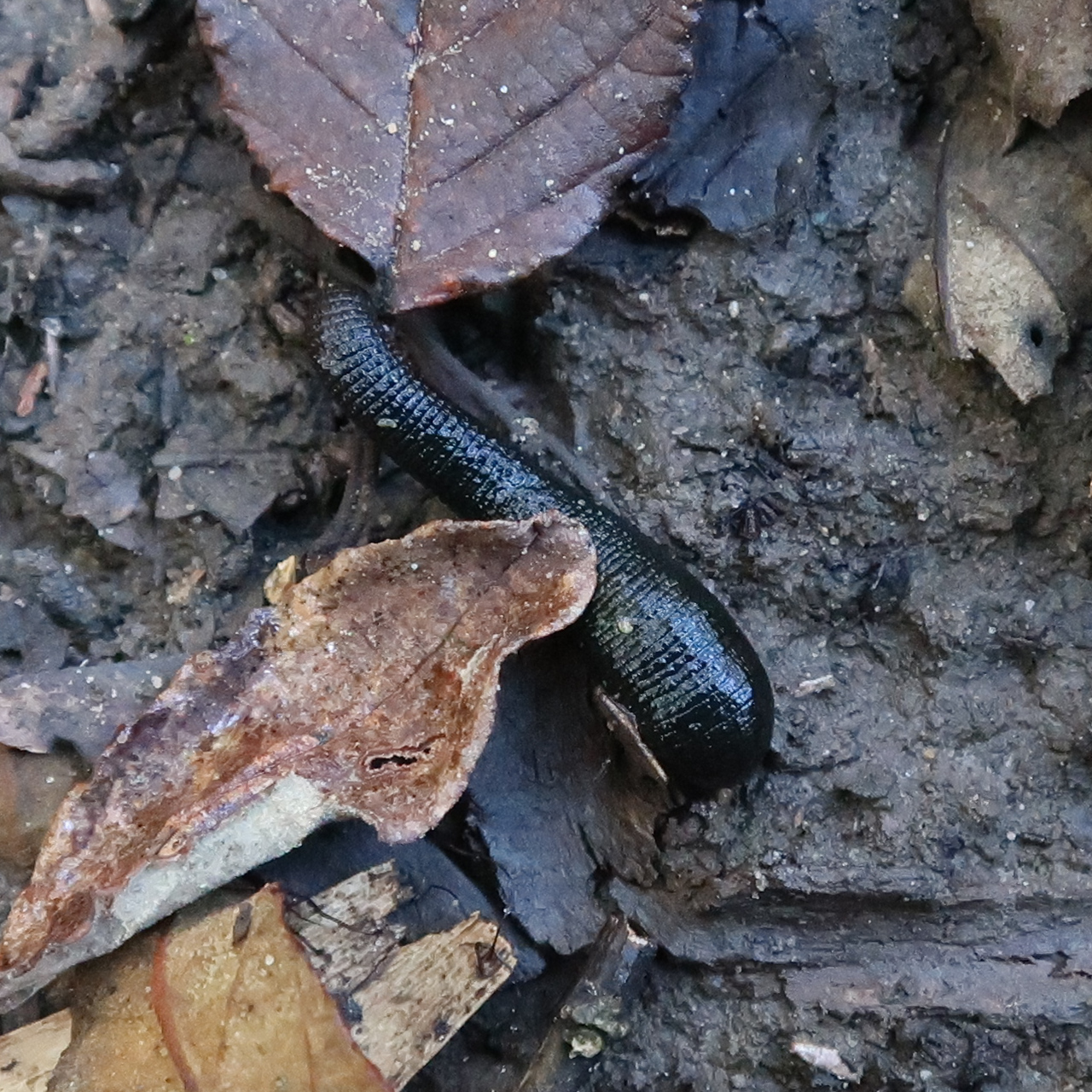
- Philaemon pungens

Scientific classification
- Kingdom: Animalia
- Phylum: Annelida
- Clade: Pleistoannelida
- Clade: Sedentaria
- Class: Clitellata
- Subclass: Hirudinea
- Order: Arhynchobdellida
- Family: Haemadipsidae
- Genus: Philaemon; Lambert, 1898

Type species
- Philaemon pungens Lambert, 1898

= Philaemon =

Genus of leeches

Philaemon is a genus of Australian leeches. The taxon authority is sometimes listed as Blanchard and sometimes as Lambert. Lambert provided the actual description but gave the credit to Blanchard, who provided the name itself.

== Species ==
It includes the following species:

- Philaemon gloriosi (Richardson, 1974)
- Philaemon grandidieri Blanchard, 1917
- Philaemon grandis Ingram, 1957
- Philaemon mediorubra (Richardson, 1975)
- Philaemon minutus Blanchard, 1917
- Philaemon nymboidae (Richardson, 1975)
- Philaemon pungens Lambert, 1898
