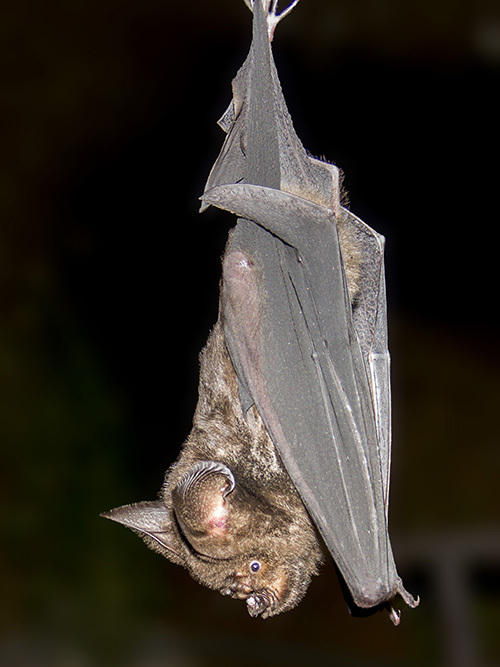

Conservation status
- Least Concern (IUCN 3.1)

Scientific classification
- Kingdom: Animalia
- Phylum: Chordata
- Class: Mammalia
- Order: Chiroptera
- Family: Hipposideridae
- Genus: Hipposideros
- Species: H. armiger

Binomial name
- Hipposideros armiger (Hodgson, 1835)
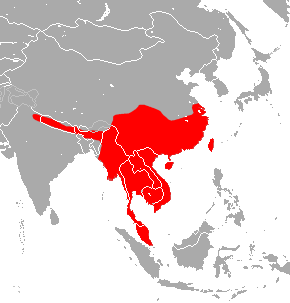
- Great roundleaf bat range

= Great roundleaf bat =

Species of bat

The great roundleaf bat, also known as the great Himalayan leaf-nosed bat (Hipposideros armiger) is a species of bat in the family Hipposideridae found in South Asia, Southeast Asia, and China. It gives birth to two young a year. It has been assessed as a least concern species by the IUCN.

== Taxonomy ==
There are four recognised subspecies of the bat. They are:

- H. a. armiger
- H. a. fujianensis
- H. a. terasensis
- H. a. traninhensis

== Description ==
The great roundleaf bat is similar in appearance to the closely related intermediate roundleaf bat (H. larvatus). However, the great roundleaf bat is larger and possesses four, not three, lateral accessory leaflets on each side of the main noseleaf. This bat has a forearm length up to 9.8 cm, and weighs up to 60 g. After an experiment published by Kathryn Knight, in which they painted the accessory leaflets and the ears and videotaped them, it was concluded that when they clicked, the leaflets closed and their ears bent down. When listening to the clicking they opened their noseleaf and their ears.

== Biology ==
=== Reproduction ===
It breeds once a year and gives birth to two young. Females have been found pregnant from January to early May, while the young were seen attached to their mothers from February to June.

=== Diet ===
The bat is insectivorous, with its diet mainly being composed of beetles, butterflies and moths, flies, and Hymenoptera. It has been observed foraging in cleared woodland, gardens, between avenues of trees, and around street lights.

=== Echolocation ===
The bat echolocates with a frequency of 65 — 75 kHz.

=== Parasitism ===
This species is a food source of the parasite Sinospelaeobdella, a jawed land leech.

== Habitat and distribution ==
This bat has been recorded throughout South and Southeast Asia.

It has been recorded in Northern and Northeastern India, along with Central, Eastern and Western Nepal in South Asia. It is found south of the Yangtze river in China, and has also been recorded on the islands of Hong Kong and Taiwan. In Southeast Asia, it has been recorded in Myanmar, Thailand, Laos, Vietnam, and Malaysia. It has been recorded at elevations of 100-2031 meters above sea level.

It is a low-flying species. In South Asia, the species is a high altitude species that is found in montane and bamboo forests. It has been recorded roosting alone, as well as in small colonies of several bats, sharing its roosting space in caves, lofts of houses, verandahs of old houses, and old temples with bats of other species.

In China, the species is found in a variety of habitats. They are known to roost in caves and a variety of man-made structures in colonies of hundreds of bats that are shared with Rhinolopus bats.

In Southeast Asia, the bat roosts in caves, but is known to forage in areas far from its roosts.

== Conservation ==
The species is common throughout its range, and has a large population. It has been assessed as a least concern species by the IUCN. Localized threats to the species include deforestation, agriculture, mining, and roost disturbance in South Asia, and roost disturbance and subsistence hunting in Laos, Vietnam, and Thailand. The species occur in several protected areas across its range.
