= Michael Tweedie =

British curator

Michael Willmer Forbes Tweedie (2 September 1907 – 25 March 1993) was a naturalist and archaeologist working in South East Asia, who was Director of the Raffles Museum in Singapore.

== Biography ==
Tweedie was the son of Maurice Carmichael Tweedie, who was Deputy Inspector-General in the Imperial Indian Police Service, and his wife Mildred Clarke.

He read Natural Science at Cambridge University, specializing in zoology and geology, followed by a short spell working as an oil geologist in Venezuela. He became assistant curator of the Raffles Museum (now the National University of Singapore's Lee Kong Chian Natural History Museum) in 1932 until the Japanese occupation in 1941.

At the outbreak of war in 1939, he joined the volunteer Royal Air Force and in 1941 joined the Royal Air Force as a camouflage officer, drawing on his knowledge of camouflage in nature. After Singapore fell, he was evacuated to Java, where his knowledge of Malay, learned from the local staff in Singapore, was valuable. He was taken prisoner by the Japanese in Java. While being held at Boi Glodok he developed a yeast mixture, grown on potatoes, whose high vitamin B content helped cure his fellow prisoners of pellagra. He was subsequently moved to Nagasaki in Japan and then Mukden (Shenyang) in Manchuria before liberation by Soviet troops in 1945.

After the end of World War II, he became Director of the museum in 1946, remaining in that post until 1957. Tweedie was involved in many biological and archaeological expeditions in South East Asia and collected many specimens himself. Many of Tweedie's collections were of species that proved to be new to science (such as a leech, Phytobdella catenifera). He also wrote many scientific articles particularly regarding crustaceans, fish, and reptiles. He also wrote many books to encourage the layman in the study of natural history and archaeology. He was made an honorary member of the Malayan Nature Society.

Tweedie married Elvira Toby, of Hobart, Australia, in 1938, and they had a son and two daughters.

== Legacy ==
Tweedie is commemorated in the scientific names of a species of Malaysian snake, Macrocalamus tweediei.

== Bibliography ==
- Editor of the Malaysian Nature Handbooks series published by Longman Malaysia.
- Tweedie MWF (1953). "The Stone Age in Malaya". Journal of the Malayan Branch Royal Asiatic Society 26 (2): 1-90.
- Tweedie MWF, Harrison JL (1954). Malayan Animal Life. Longman.
- Tweedie MWF (1977). The World of Dinosaurs. New York: William Morrow and Co., Inc
- Tweedie MWF (1983). The Snakes of Malaya. Singapore: Singapore National Printers Ltd. 105 pp. ASIN B0007B41IO.
