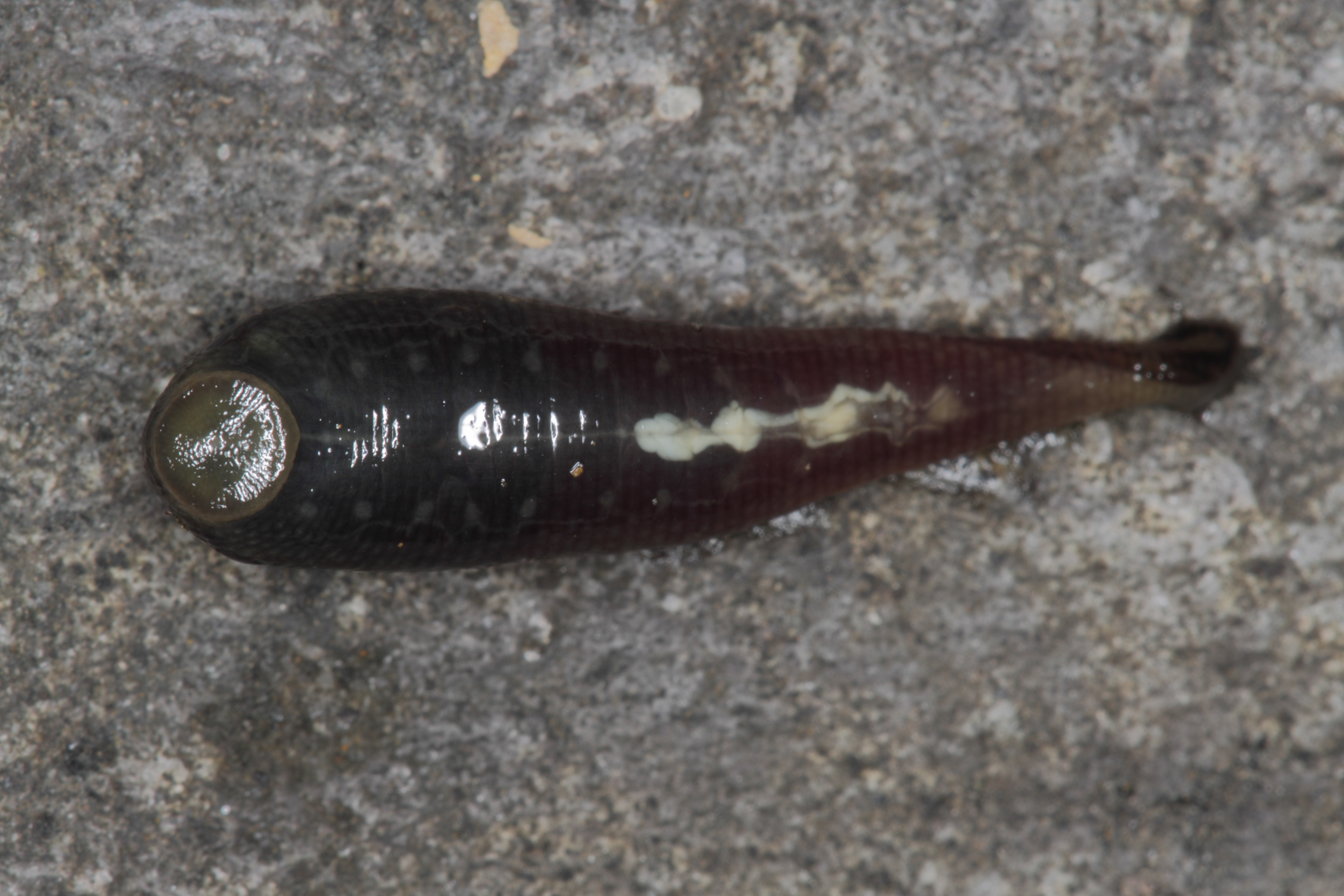

Scientific classification
- Kingdom: Animalia
- Phylum: Annelida
- Clade: Pleistoannelida
- Clade: Sedentaria
- Class: Clitellata
- Subclass: Hirudinea
- Order: Arhynchobdellida
- Family: Haemadipsidae
- Genus: Haemadipsa
- Species: H. sylvestris

Binomial name
- Haemadipsa sylvestris Blanchard, 1894

= Haemadipsa sylvestris =

Lowland blood-feeding leech found in Indomalaya

Haemadipsa sylvestris is a species of blood-feeding leech recorded from India, Nepal, Sri Lanka, Myanmar, Malaysia, and Indonesia. A species of freshwater crab, Himalayapotamon atkinsonianum, has been recorded as a host. The species is known to grow as large as 40 mm in length and 7 mm wide. It is a lowland species, and closely associated with water; it lives near riverbanks and ponds, and may sometimes be flooded out in some regions.
