= AKIP1 =

Protein-coding gene in the species Homo sapiens

Identifiers
- Aliases: AKIP1, BCA3, C11orf17, A-kinase interacting protein 1
- External IDs: OMIM: 609191; MGI: 3041226; HomoloGene: 10765; GeneCards: AKIP1; OMA:AKIP1 - orthologs

Gene location (Human)
Chr.	Chromosome 11 (human)
Band	11p15.4	Start	8,911,139 bp
Band	11p15.4	End	8,920,084 bp

Gene location (Mouse)
Chr.	Chromosome 7 (mouse)
Band	7|7 E3	Start	109,302,897 bp
Band	7|7 E3	End	109,311,396 bp
RNA expression pattern
Bgee	Human / Mouse (ortholog); Top expressed in: oocyte; secondary oocyte; right adrenal cortex; left adrenal cortex; stromal cell of endometrium; Descending thoracic aorta; germinal epithelium; ascending aorta; right coronary artery; muscle of thigh / Top expressed in: right kidney; left lobe of liver; proximal tubule; seminiferous tubule; fetal liver hematopoietic progenitor cell; sciatic nerve; olfactory epithelium; lacrimal gland; transitional epithelium of urinary bladder; Paneth cell; More reference expression data
BioGPS	n/a
Gene ontology
Molecular function	protein binding
Cellular component	nucleoplasm; nucleus
Biological process	substrate adhesion-dependent cell spreading; regulation of NIK/NF-kappaB signaling
Sources:Amigo / QuickGO
Orthologs
Species	Human	Mouse
Entrez	56672	57373
Ensembl	ENSG00000166452	ENSMUSG00000031023
UniProt	Q9NQ31	Q9JJR5
RefSeq (mRNA)	NM_001206645; NM_001206646; NM_001206647; NM_001206648; NM_020642 NM_182901	NM_020616
RefSeq (protein)	NP_001193575; NP_001193576; NP_001193577; NP_065693	NP_065641
Location (UCSC)	Chr 11: 8.91 – 8.92 Mb	Chr 7: 109.3 – 109.31 Mb
PubMed search
- Wikidata
View/Edit Human	View/Edit Mouse

A kinase (PRKA) interacting protein 1 is a protein in humans that is encoded by the AKIP1 gene.

This gene encodes a nuclear protein that interacts with protein kinase A catalytic subunit, and regulates the effect of the cAMP-dependent protein kinase signaling pathway on the NF-kappa-B activation cascade. Alternatively spliced transcript variants have been described for this gene. [provided by RefSeq, Oct 2011].
