= PWWP2A =

Protein-coding gene in the species Homo sapiens

Identifiers
- Aliases: PWWP2A, MST101, PWWP domain containing 2A
- External IDs: OMIM: 617823; MGI: 1918052; GeneCards: PWWP2A

Gene location (Human)
Chr.	Chromosome 5 (human)
Band	5q33.3	Start	160,061,801 bp
Band	5q33.3	End	160,119,450 bp

Gene location (Mouse)
Chr.	Chromosome 11 (mouse)
Band	11|11 B1.1	Start	43,572,825 bp
Band	11|11 B1.1	End	43,612,318 bp
RNA expression pattern
Bgee	Human / Mouse (ortholog); Top expressed in: mucosa of ileum; endothelial cell; corpus callosum; Achilles tendon; epithelium of colon; thymus; monocyte; tibialis anterior muscle; ventricular zone; cerebellum / Top expressed in: hand; tail of embryo; neural layer of retina; genital tubercle; epiblast; ganglionic eminence; thymus; ventricular zone; zygote; human fetus; More reference expression data
BioGPS	n/a
Orthologs
Databases	NCBI: entry; OMA: entry
Species	Human	Mouse
Entrez	114825	70802
Ensembl	ENSG00000170234	ENSMUSG00000044950
UniProt	Q96N64	Q69Z61
RefSeq (mRNA)	NM_001130864; NM_001267035; NM_052927; NM_001349732; NM_001349733 NM_001349734; NM_001349735	NM_001164231; NM_027557; NM_001363141; NM_001363142
RefSeq (protein)	NP_001124336; NP_001253964; NP_443159; NP_001336661; NP_001336662 NP_001336663; NP_001336664	NP_001157703; NP_081833; NP_001350070; NP_001350071
Location (UCSC)	Chr 5: 160.06 – 160.12 Mb	Chr 11: 43.57 – 43.61 Mb
PubMed search
- Wikidata
View/Edit Human	View/Edit Mouse

PWWP domain containing 2A is a protein that in humans is encoded by the PWWP2A gene.
