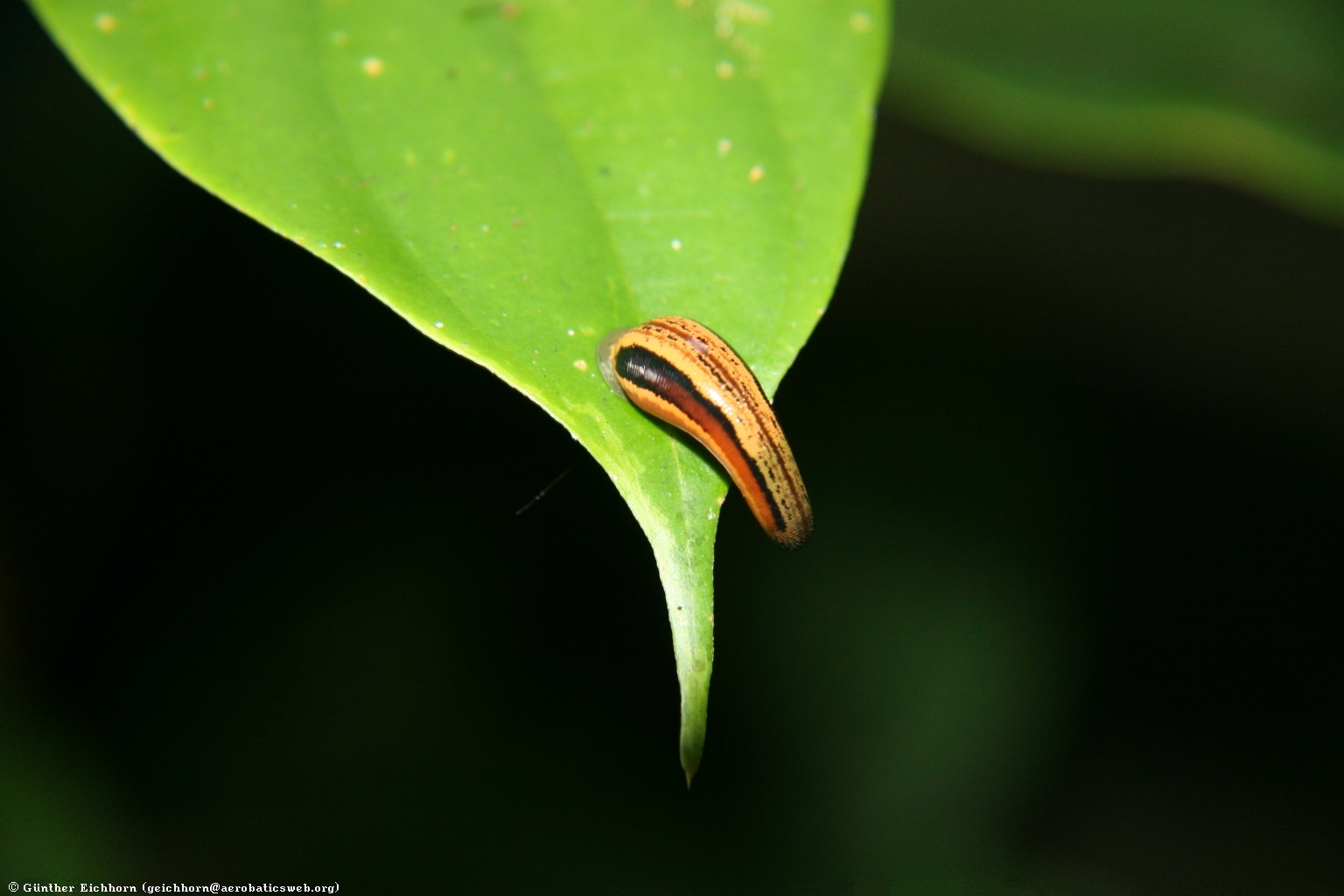
- Tiger leech in Borneo, Malaysia

Scientific classification
- Kingdom: Animalia
- Phylum: Annelida
- Clade: Pleistoannelida
- Clade: Sedentaria
- Class: Clitellata
- Subclass: Hirudinea
- Order: Arhynchobdellida
- Family: Haemadipsidae
- Genus: Haemadipsa; Tennent, 1859

Species
- See text

= Haemadipsa =

Genus of annelids

Haemadipsa is a genus of leeches, with members commonly known as jawed land leeches. These annelids are known from subtropical and tropical regions around the Indian and Pacific Ocean. Examples of well-known Haemadipsa include the Indian Leech (Haemadipsa sylvestris) and the yamabiru, or Japanese Mountain Leech (Haemadipsa zeylanica). Members of the genus feed on blood. They are troublesome to humans and animals especially because their bites result in prolonged bleeding.

== Species ==
As of 2025, the genus Haemadipsa includes:

1. Haemadipsa crenata Ngamprasertwong, 2007
2. Haemadipsa hainana (Song, Zhang et Tan, 1977) - Hainan Island, China
3. Haemadipsa interrupta Moore, 1935 - Thailand
4. Haemadipsa japonica Yang, 1996
5. Haemadipsa limuna
6. Haemadipsa montana Moore, 1927
7. Haemadipsa morsitans Blanchard, 1917
8. Haemadipsa ornata Moore, 1927
9. Haemadipsa picta Moore, 1929 (Tiger leech)
10. Haemadipsa rjukjuana Oka, 1910 - Taiwan
11. Haemadipsa sumatrana Horst, 1883 - Borneo, Sumatra
12. Haemadipsa sylvestris Blanchard, 1894 - India, Indochina, Malesia
13. Haemadipsa trimaculosa Ngamprasertwong, 2007
14. Haemadipsa yanyuanensis Liu & Song, 1977 - Sichuan, Yunnan
15. Haemadipsa zeylanica (Moquin-Tandon, 1827) (Japanese mountain leech) - may contain subspecies: H. zeylanica japonica
  H. zeylanica cochiniana

Moved elsewhere

- Haemadipsa cavatuses Yang et al., 2009 is now in Sinospelaeobdella
