= John Percy Moore =

American zoologist

John Percy Moore (1869–1965) was an American zoologist who specialized in the research of leeches.

== Biography ==
Born in Williamsport, Pennsylvania in 1869, Moore was educated at the Central High School of Philadelphia, where he received his Bachelor of Arts degree in 1886. A student at the University of Pennsylvania, he obtained his Bachelor of Science degree there in 1892 and his Doctor of Philosophy in 1896.

After 1890, he was repeatedly employed by the United States Fish Commission. An instructor in biology at the Hahnemann Medical College from 1896 to 1898, he served as an instructor in zoology at the Marine Biological Laboratory in Woods Hole, Mass after 1901.

An instructor in zoology at Penn from 1892 to 1907, he served as an assistant professor from 1907 to 1909, and was then appointed as a professor. In 1902, he became assistant curator of the Academy of Natural Sciences in Philadelphia and worked for many years with Witmer Stone. He was elected to the American Philosophical Society in 1918.

In 1939, he was appointed professor emeritus. Moore also served as a member of the board of trustees of the Academy of Natural Sciences] from 1938 to 1957. In 1957, he was made an Honorary Life Trustee.

== Research ==
Moore's primary zoological interest was the study of leeches and their biological control. During his years of scientific activity (1893–1963), he wrote more than one hundred papers, sixty-two of which were about leeches.

He conducted field research in India between 1930 and 1931 to study the life history of Indian land leeches. His association with the United States National Museum (USNM) began in the early 1900s when he started identifying specimens in the Museum's leech collection. In recognition of his work, he was appointed Honorary Collaborator in the Division of Marine Invertebrates, USNM, in 1930. On his death in 1965, Moore's collection of leeches was donated to the USNM.

=== Species described ===
The following species were first described by J.P. Moore (also abbreviated J. Percy Moore):

- Phytobdella catenifera
- Haemadipsa interrupta
- Diplocardia longa

=== Taxon named in his honor ===
- Pseudochromis moorei the Jaguar dottyback, was named in his honor.
