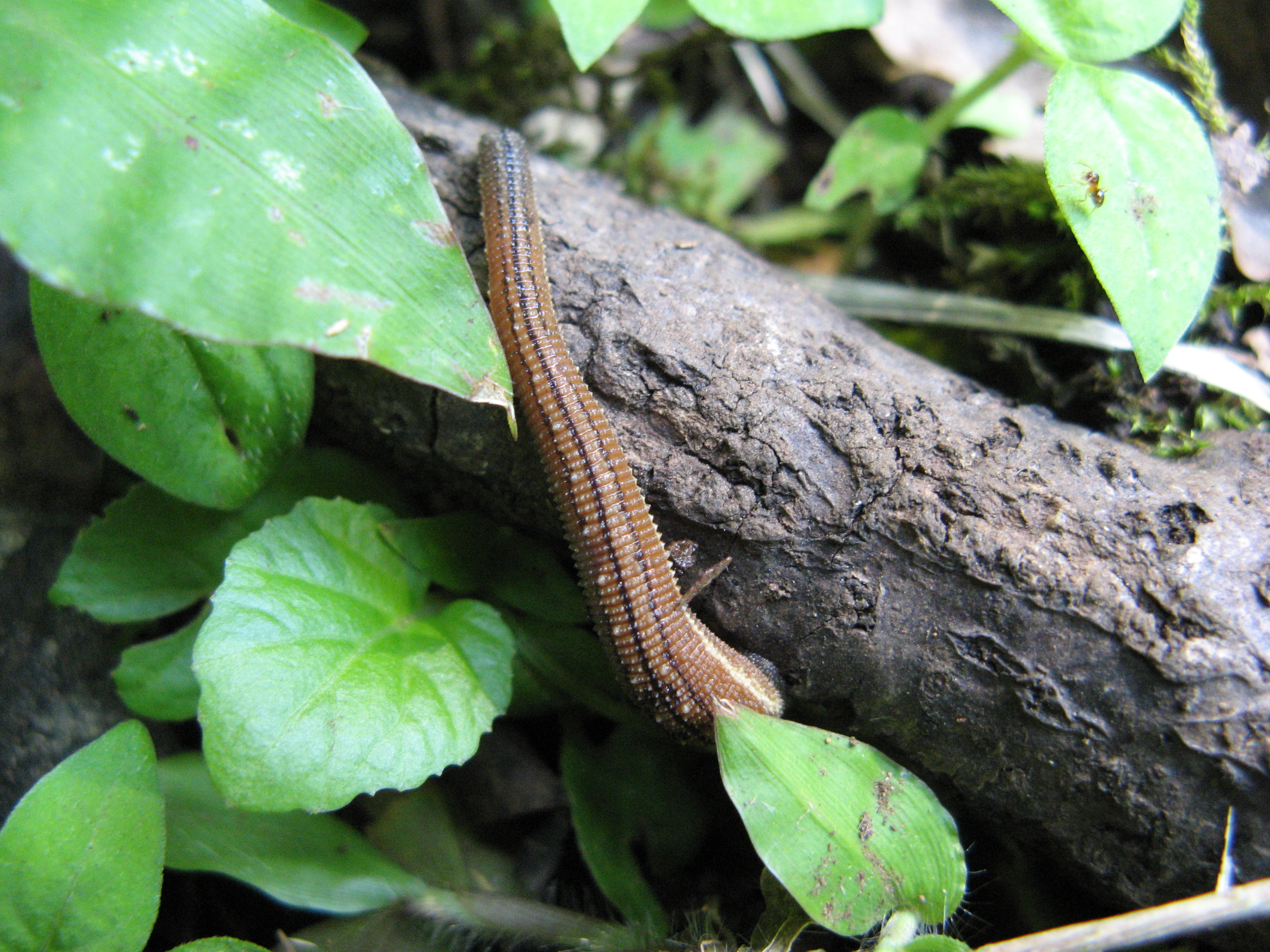
- Japanese mountain leech (Haemadipsa zeylanica)

Scientific classification
- Kingdom: Animalia
- Phylum: Annelida
- Clade: Pleistoannelida
- Clade: Sedentaria
- Class: Clitellata
- Subclass: Hirudinea
- Infraclass: Euhirudinea
- Order: Arhynchobdellida
- Suborder: Hirudiniformes
- Family: Haemadipsidae; Blanchard, 1893

Genera
- see text

Synonyms
- Domanibdellidae; Idiobdellidae; Nesophilaemonidae

= Haemadipsidae =

Family of land leeches

Haemadipsidae (From Greek "haima" and "dipsa" ("blood" and "thirst", respectively)) are a family of jawed leeches. They are a monophyletic group of hirudiniform proboscisless leeches. These leeches have five pairs of eyes, with the last two separated by two eyeless segments. The family is monotypic, containing only the subfamily Haemadipsinae. However, the family can apparently be divided into two or three distinct lineages. At least one of the proposed splits, while not a distinct family, might be a valid subfamily.

Haemadipsids have two or three jaws. The two-jawed (duognathous) species were classified in a number of largely monotypic or non-monophyletic genera, so they were placed into a single monophyletic genus called Chtonobdella.

To increase grip, their caudal suckers have textured "friction" or "sucker" rays.

Commonly known as jawed land leeches, these annelids are known from subtropical and tropical regions around the Indian and Pacific Ocean. Well-known Haemadipsidae are for example the Indian Leech (Haemadipsa sylvestris) and the yamabiru or Japanese Mountain Leech (Haemadipsa zeylanica). Members of the family feed on blood, except Idiobdella which has adapted to eat small snails.

The other notable group of jawed blood-sucking leeches are the aquatic Hirudinidae. The Xerobdellidae are sometimes included in the Haemadipsidae, but their status as a distinct family is supported by sequence analysis of the nuclear 18S and 28S rDNA and mitochondrial COI genes as well as the anatomy of their sexual organs and nephridia; the latter are located at the belly rather than along the body sides as in the Haemadipsidae proper. All Xerobdellidae have three jaws.

Haemadipsidae probably originated in the Triassic, more than 150 million years ago (mya). The diversification of the large Asian genus Haemadipsa probably did not take place until the Eocene, about 50 mya.

Because members of this family are terrestrial, feed on vertebrate blood, and digest blood meals fairly slowly, they are used in invertebrate-derived environmental DNA (eDNA) research. By extracting DNA from leech guts and sequencing vertebrate-specific genes, it is possible to identify which vertebrate the leech in question has fed upon, and therefore what animals are in the surrounding habitat. This methodology can be complementary to camera trap biodiversity surveys, which often undercount smaller animals.

== Genera ==
As of April 2025, the following genera are assigned to this family:

1. Chtonobdella Grube, 1866 (synonyms include Geobdella)
2. Diestecostoma Vaillant, 1890
3. Domanibdella Richardson, 1974
4. Haemadipsa Tennent, 1859
5. Hygrobdella Caballero, 1940
6. Idiobdella: monotypic I. seychellensis Harding, 1913
7. Keibdella Richardson, 1975
8. Leiobdella Richardson, 1974
9. Malagabdella Richardson, 1975
10. Mesobdella Blanchard, 1893
11. Neoterrabdella Richardson, 1969
12. Nesophilaemon Nybelin, 1942
13. Philaemon Lambert, 1898
14. Planobdella Blanchard, 1894
15. Sinospelaeobdella Liu, Huang & Liu, 2019
16. Tritetrabdella Moore, 1928
